= Battle of Trafalgar order of battle =

The position and direction of the two forces shortly before impact. The combined fleet had been sailing south but Villeneuve had left standing orders that, if the rear of the column was attacked first, they were to reverse direction (by wearing ship) and they had carried out those orders. The centre, where he was located, was exposed in either case. (Note: The map is based an illustration in Nofi, Al (1981). "Nelson's Last Victory: The Battle of Trafalgar, Oct. 21, 1805". Strategies and Tactics Magazine (84).. The map is identical to Map GREN 4B/10 in the Grenville Collection of the National Maritime Museum, Greenwich, London. Hand-drawn with a hand-written battle order, it is dated to 1805.)

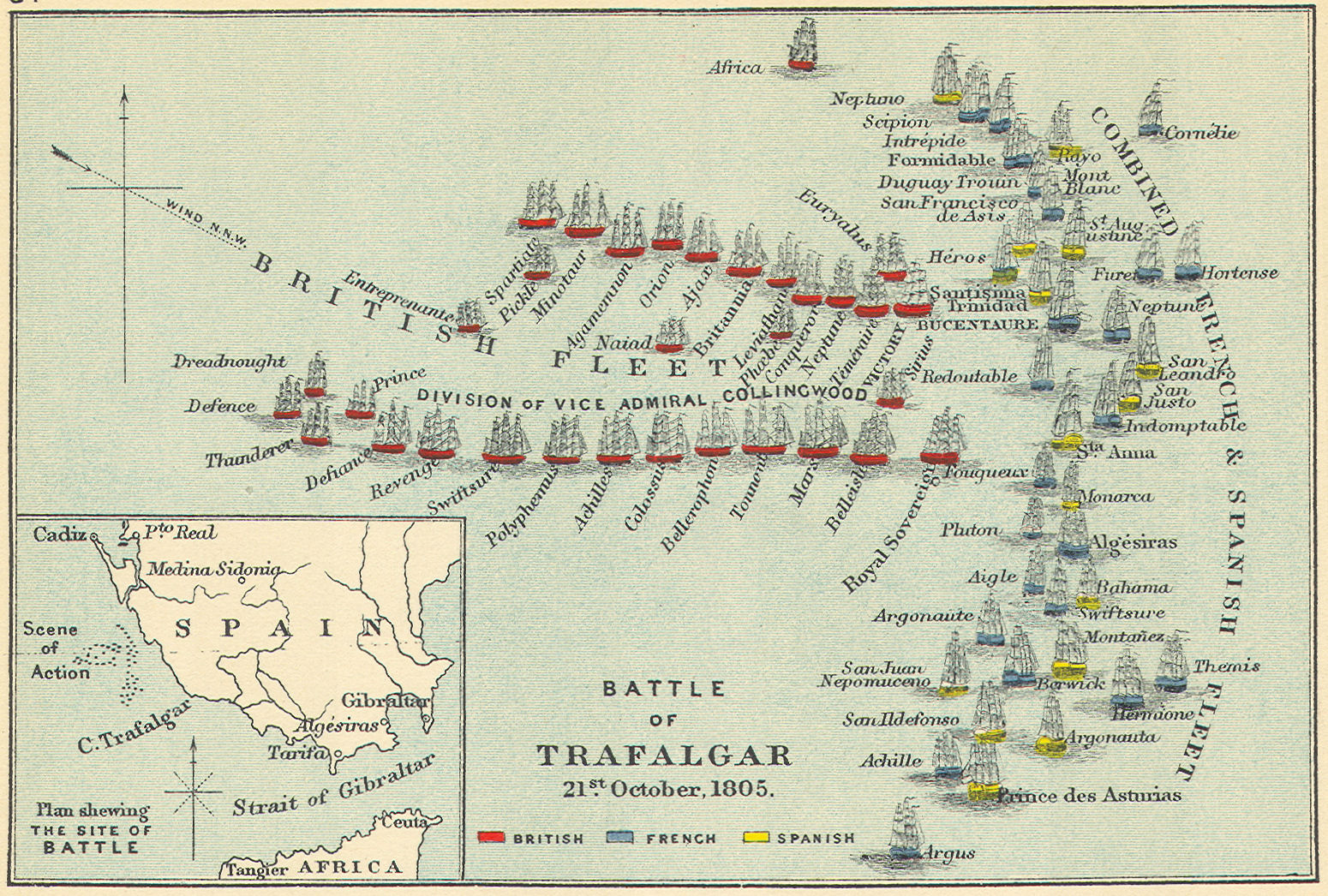
This map showing the all-important wind direction, which was NNW (or NW). Both fleets were sailing downwind, with the wind on different tacks. They were thus converging on the centre of the combined fleet, at the vertex of the angle of convergence. Seeing the battle about to begin, the French-Spanish wore ship and began to close-haul in the reverse direction. Villeneuve thought to bring the whole van crashing down on Nelson in the centre, but he lost headway against the wind and could not close. Meanwhile his former rear, now his van, appeared to Nelson to be escaping to Cádiz. He brought the weather column into the wind to pursue and caught them. The business in the centre was finished by Collingwood, lee column commander, who took on the new enemy rear piecemeal as it came slowly into range. (Note: Map is a reproduction of Weller, F.S. (1892). "Battle of Trafalgar, 21st October, 1805". In Gardiner, Samuel Rawson (ed.). A School Atlas of English History. London and New York: Longmans, Green and Co. p. 84.. Gardiner says in the "Preface," however, that No. 84 was taken from another work, Johnston, Alexander Keith (1850). Alison, M.R. (ed.). Atlas to Alison's History of Europe. Edinburgh and London: William Blackwood and Sons. p. 34.)

The Battle of Trafalgar was fought between British and Franco-Spanish fleets on 21 October 1805. A force of 27 British ships of the line faced 33 allied ships. Both forces were formed in two columns; the British sailed parallel, the allied one following the other.

The Battle of Trafalgar was fought by sailing vessels and therefore cannot be understood in substance except as the manoeuvring of sailing vessels according to the principles of sailing. Without understanding the importance of wind and weather, especially wind direction, the modern can make no sense of the manoeuvring. Once those principles are understood, the plan of battle unfolds in a transparent fashion. The plan is included here as well as its general applicability to real events.

Real battles do not always develop according to plan, or exactly according to plan. Commanding officers usually are empowered to respond to the battlefield situation as it develops. Such concepts as "sailing order" and "battle order" are constructs. In a column of ships sailing anywhere the first ship forward was Number 1, the second, Number 2, etc. The battle order was based on planned order of attack. Ships were assigned places in these orders by the commander, sometimes temporarily or even extemporaneously.

Nelson used the order that was best momentarily. In stormy weather or other adverse conditions the commanders might not be able to control the order. "Nelson's fleet" was not a fixed entity; ships were continually joining or leaving his fleet for various reasons: for example HMS Superb, was in the docks being repaired after four years at sea, including the chase of Villeneuve and was daily expected to re-join the fleet, where her Captain, Richard Goodwin Keats was to be Nelson’s second, but she was not repaired in time. The complements of the ships also were variable. The early historians of the battle were not sure of what they were, nor did they know exactly what the casualties were. The roster lists of the ships before sailing were generally used. Afterward there were plenty of reports.

The numbers and orders of this article are based on the figures of modern scholars for the most part. There is general disagreement on the exact order and the exact numbers, but, on the whole, the different estimates are close to each other and can probably be taken as accurate within a few per cent. An effort is made to keep consistency between the tables and the graph.

== Plan of battle ==
=== The constraints of sailing and sailing vessels ===
The combined French-Spanish fleet left Cádiz harbour in a loose line and turned to the south along the coast of Andalusia, headed for Naples through the Straits of Gibraltar. They were taking advantage of the north-westerly wind which was blowing on the starboard (right) rear quarter, nearly amidships, pushing them along at a slow rate and causing a swell (waves) perpendicular to the wind direction. It struck the ships from the side, causing them to roll and ruining their stability as gun platforms. The column had a predetermined order, which was necessary for sailing, to prevent some ships from getting between the wind and other ships, "stealing" their wind and running the risk of collision.

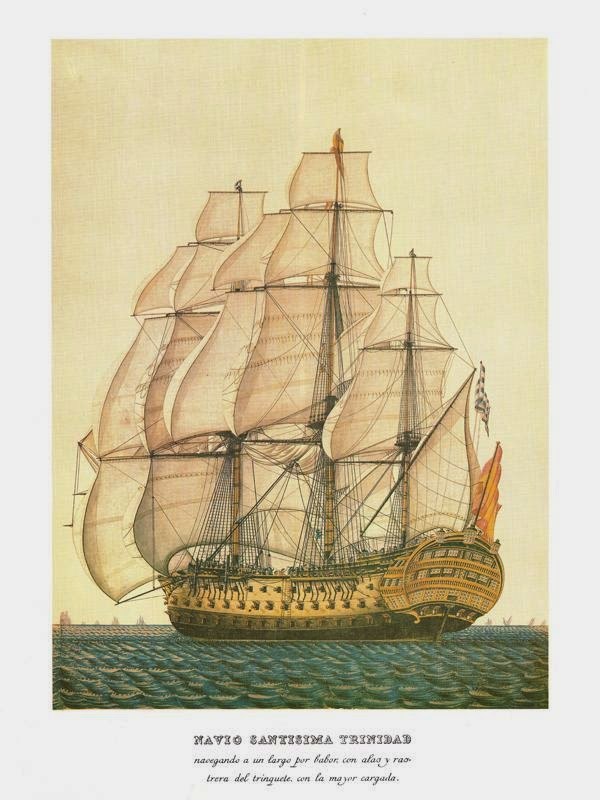
Representation of the Santisima Trinidad, the largest ship in the combined fleet, with 4 decks and 136 guns, under full sail. The position of the flag and the curvature of the sails reveal the direction of the wind. The ship is depicted at maximum headway. If the ship were to wear, it would rotate clockwise. The observer is looking at the weather side.

The same wind that was moving the French and Spanish south was also bringing the British north. A sail is basically an airfoil. When full it is curved in such a way as to create a sideways "lift," or force perpendicular to its surface, one component of which is actually against the general direction of the wind. A sailing vessel can thus sail "into the wind." A keel prevents the ship from "slipping," or sliding sideways along the wind. The sails "are full;" that is, fully curved, only at certain angles to the wind direction. The angle is adjustable via "sheets," or lines, which have to be hauled manually from the deck. The force required is high. When not full, the sails flap uselessly in the wind, or "luff." The sailors must then change the angle, or "trim the sails," until they fill.

A square rigged ship cannot sail within 6 points (67.5 degrees) either side of the wind. If the wind is coming from the north, the closest it could sail would be ENE or WNW. In order to travel in that direction, it must "fall off," or move to an angle with the wind on one side or the other, a "tack." A ship tacks back and forth against the wind, or "beats," each tack earning it some "headway".

In addition, sailing with the wind directly aft ("abaft") or directly on either side ("abeam") was difficult and inefficient. Sails with the wind in those directions do not fill. The wind must be allowed only from the quarters. At those angles the sails fill and there is a component of force in the desired direction. If the wind is directly abeam, the ship must fall off or close up. The ship may sail on either side of a wind directly astern. A manoeuvre similar to coming about is used to move the wind from one side to another: wearing. The helm is put over, the sails go limp, they are adjusted to fill on the other side. The ship does not have to rotate as far, so the manoeuvre is less disruptive.

Wind is everything to a sailing vessel. It cannot move anywhere without it (is "becalmed"). If the wind is too great the sails may have to be shortened to present less area, a procedure call "reefing." In a storm the ship must sail close to the wind or have it close astern. As the waves are generally coming in with the wind, a ship sailing close into the wind generally cuts them perpendicularly and only pitches; i.e., drops into the troughs and rises on the crests. A ship with the storm wind abeam is struck longitudinally and rolls treacherously, running a risk of capsizing. To avoid that risk the captain must run before the wind. All directions are evaluated with regard to the wind. The side of a ship toward the wind is called the "weather" or "upwind" side; away, the "lee" or "downwind" side (refer to Windward and leeward).

Much has been made of the tactics of various great sailing captains, but the greatest constraints come from wind direction and relative position. The captain of a steam vessel has considerably more freedom to take his ship where he wishes to take it, but the tactics of a sailing captain are to a large extent already predetermined by nature. To get to any point the sailing captain must plot a course taking wind direction into consideration. He must have judgement and skill, and is evaluated by the men on that skill.

=== Nelson's plan of battle ===
Nelson's battle plan is revealed on a surviving "memorandum" to his captains scrawled on a sheet of paper. The memorandum was meant to be official, as it is signed "Nelson and Bronte" (Note: Nelson was the Duke of Bronte; he signed much of his official correspondence with this conceit.) and dated "Victory, off Cádiz, 9th October, 1805," which was 12 days before the battle on the 21st. Nelson and his fleet were patrolling off Cádiz, waiting the exit of a combined French and Spanish fleet. He knew better than to attack a heavily fortified harbour, the most heavily fortified in Spain. Meanwhile Nelson was staying out of sight and out of reach.

Sailing ships were not amenable, compared to modern ships, to this type of combat; they moved in slow motion at the mercy of wind and wave. A fleet of ships could deliver the most fire without risking hitting one of their own when it was sailing broadside in a line to the enemy, hence the designation "ship-of-the-line" for heavy ships of 50 or more guns. In variable weather, the manoeuvring required to set up a line could cost "... such a loss of time that the opportunity would probably be lost ...." While the attackers were manoeuvring, the targets might escape. Nelson therefore, had his fleet sail in order of battle.

In order "to make the business decisive," Nelson would attack on sight, going directly for the enemy line. This tactic was not standard, but neither was it new or unusual. The plan was revealed to one of Nelson’s favourite captains, Richard Goodwin Keats, in an animated conversation while the two were walking in Nelson’s garden at Merton just weeks earlier. It did have a drawback. Only the front of the attacking column could engage. Nelson's 27 ships-of-the-line would attack in two columns. If they succeeded in breaking the enemy line, they could then take on the enemy piecemeal.

The general orders from Nelson were to "make the attack upon the enemy, and to follow up the blow until they are captured or destroyed." If individual ships were momentarily lost in the confusion, they could do no better, said Nelson, than to pull alongside an enemy and fight broadside.

Once the enemy was in sight, the British fleet would form two columns. The double column would be sailing with the wind on one side, the windward or weather side. The columns were thus described as the "weather column" or the "lee column." Nelson would take command of the weather column while his "second-in-command" would take the other. The second could act independently. However, at that time Nelson did not know which side would be the weather side. That detail could not be decided until they were on the expected final approach. At that time the second half of the single line would sail along the leeward side of the first.

As they sailed, the wind could be anywhere on the weather side, from bow to stern. It could not be from a disallowed direction. If, reasoned Nelson, the enemy fleet was first seen to windward, it was probably extended so that the van (front) could not help whatever was behind it. Such a scenario implies the enemy stretched across Nelson's port bow quarter moving anticlockwise, but he did not know where the wind would be. His column would either be able to fetch (Note: Bring it within the allowed angles for close-hauling.) the enemy column or not. If not, the opportunity was lost; they would have to fall off to leeward, wear, and come up on the other side, by which time the hoped-for battle would be only a pursuit.

If they could fetch the enemy on the current tack, they were to turn to port perpendicular to the enemy column (or near it). The lee column would now be facing the enemy's rear. Taking a bearing on the 12th ship from the end, they were to sail through to it, while the weather column sailed through to the centre. The 20 ships to the front were to be ignored. Nelson hoped to destroy all the ships to the rear before the enemy's van could wear round and join the battle. They were hoping to capture Villeneuve, whom they supposed to be in the centre. If the enemy van tacked or wore in an effort to stage a rescue, the British fleet would station itself between them and the captured and disabled ships, and defeat them in further battle.

If on the other hand the enemy fleet was first seen off the lee side; that is, off the starboard bow, the British would be in the strongest position. Turning to starboard they could glide downwind to the enemy and strike him wherever they pleased. Nelson seems to have believed the enemy line would have the same direction of travel, anticlockwise around the British line. Thus the lee line would act by the same instructions, turning to starboard, sail through to the 12th ship from the end.

As luck would have it, in the real battle, the enemy appeared to the lee. However, they were sailing clockwise around the British fleet, forcing the weather column to attack their rear. The real situation changed rapidly as the enemy column reacted but the direct attack on the centre and doubling of the column were planned and resulted in victory.

=== Matching the plan to the real battle ===
The French and Spanish were crowded into Cádiz Harbour, protected by shore batteries. Nelson entertained briefly a proposal to sail up to the entrance to the harbour and saturate it with the new Congreve Rocket, setting the enemy ships on fire. That is exactly what Villeneuve was hoping they would do. He believed the combined fire of shore and ship was the best chance of destroying Nelson. He delayed, hoping to exploit any impetuosity and impatience the younger commander might evidence.

Nelson's link to the enemy was an unobtrusive line of spy ships. The enemy saw only the first in line observing them at a distance. That ship was in signal range of another, which was in range of another, all the way back to Nelson, wherever he happened to be.

Higher-level decisions were being made by Napoleon, who could not wait indefinitely for the opportunity to invade Britain, and who had switched his attention to war on the continent, especially Austria and Italy. He needed Villeneuve in the Mediterranean and issued an order to sail out of Cádiz immediately.

Napoleon however, was not as skilled in naval matters and imagined that a fleet of 40 or so large vessels could leave port in an instant. It could take a considerable time for that many ships to get out of port, even under the best conditions. Moreover, they could not do so without favourable winds. If the winds were fickle, progress would be even slower and if the winds were contrary, the whole operation would be impossible.

== British fleet ==
The table below shows the British vessels as they were deployed just prior to engagement. HMS Africa, somewhat detached to the north due to a combination of weather and a missed signal during the night, was supposed to have been fourth from last, in the lee column. The rest of the ships-of-the-line were divided into two columns, with the weather column forming the northern flank and the lee column the southern flank. The enemy line had been sailing north to south in front of the wind. Just as the battle was beginning they turned individually anticlockwise, wore ship, and came into the wind, hoping to bear down on Nelson. The order of British ships in the table is the one of that moment. Prior to closing with the enemy, they were in a single line, and after engagement, the ships manoeuvred to assume the best firing positions. The British fleet of the battle consisted of 33 warships, 27 of which were ships of the line. During the battle the frigates (which had been the force observing Cádiz) and smaller vessels acted in support to the fleet, relaying messages and towing ships but did not engage. When Collingwood took command after Nelson's death he transferred to Euralyus as his own flagship, the Royal Sovereign, was badly damaged.

British fleet
Ship	Type	Guns	Fleet	Const- ruction	Commanded by (Note: Names marked † were killed in action, (DOW) were not killed immediately but died after of their wounds. (WIA) were wounded in the action but did not die of those wounds)	Complement	Casualties			
Ship	Type	Guns	Fleet	Const- ruction	Commanded by	Complement	Killed	Wounded	Total	%
Attacking the Head of the Franco-Spanish Fleet
Africa	2-decker	64	Royal Navy Ensign	(United Kingdom)	Capt Henry Digby	498	8 (Note: Adkin 2005 claim a "killed" of 18.)	44	52	10%
Weather column
Victory	3-decker	104	Royal Navy Ensign	(United Kingdom)	Vice-Admiral Lord Nelson^{†} Capt Thomas Masterman Hardy	821 (Note: Adkin 2005, p. 307 gives a crew size of 823.) nominal 850	57	102	159	19%
Téméraire	3-decker	98	Royal Navy Ensign	(United Kingdom)	Capt Eliab Harvey	718 nominal 750	47	76	123	17%
Neptune	3-decker	98	Royal Navy Ensign	(United Kingdom)	Capt Thomas Fremantle	741	10	34	44	6%
Leviathan	2-decker	74	Royal Navy Ensign	(United Kingdom)	Capt Henry William Bayntun	623	4	22	26	4%
Conqueror	2-decker	74	Royal Navy Ensign	(United Kingdom)	Capt Israel Pellew	573	3	9	12	2%
Britannia	3-decker	100	Royal Navy Ensign	(United Kingdom)	Rear-Admiral Lord Northesk; Capt Charles Bullen	854	10	42	52	6%
Agamemnon	2-decker	64	Royal Navy Ensign	(United Kingdom)	Capt Sir Edward Berry	498	2	8	10	2%
Ajax	2-decker	74	Royal Navy Ensign	(United Kingdom)	Lieut John Pilford (acting captain)	702	2	10	12	2%
Orion	2-decker	74	Royal Navy Ensign	(United Kingdom)	Capt Edward Codrington	541	1	23	24	4%
Minotaur	2-decker	74	Royal Navy Ensign	(United Kingdom)	Capt Charles Mansfield	625	3	22	25	4%
Spartiate	2-decker	74	Royal Navy Ensign	(France)	Capt Sir Francis Laforey	620	3	22	25	4%
Lee column
Royal Sovereign	3-decker	100	Royal Navy Ensign	(United Kingdom)	Vice-Admiral Cuthbert Collingwood; Capt Edward Rotheram	826	47	94	141	17%
Belleisle	2-decker	74	Royal Navy Ensign	(France)	Capt William Hargood	728	33 (Note: Broadside gives 33 killed, 93 wounded)	94	127	17%
Mars	2-decker	74	Royal Navy Ensign	(United Kingdom)	Capt George Duff^{†} Lieut William Hennah	615	27 (Note: Broadside gives 29 killed, 69 wounded)	71	98	16%
Tonnant	2-decker	80	Royal Navy Ensign	(France)	Capt Charles Tyler	688	26	50	76	11%
Bellerophon	2-decker	74	Royal Navy Ensign	(United Kingdom)	Capt John Cooke^{†} Lieut William Pryce Cumby	522	28 (Note: Broadside gives 27 killed, 123 wounded)	127	155	30%
Colossus	2-decker	74	Royal Navy Ensign	(United Kingdom)	Capt James Nicoll Morris	571	40 (Note: Broadside 2012 gives 46 killed, 160 wounded)	160	200	35%
Achille	2-decker	74	Royal Navy Ensign	(United Kingdom)	Capt Richard King	619	13	59	72	12%
Revenge	2-decker	74	Royal Navy Ensign	(United Kingdom)	Capt Robert Moorsom	598	28	51	79	13%
Polyphemus	2-decker	64	Royal Navy Ensign	(United Kingdom)	Capt Robert Redmill	484	2	4	6	1%
Swiftsure	2-decker	74	Royal Navy Ensign	(United Kingdom)	Capt William Rutherfurd	570	9	8	17	3%
Dreadnought	3-decker	98	Royal Navy Ensign	(United Kingdom)	Capt John Conn	725	7	26	33	5%
Defiance	2-decker	74	Royal Navy Ensign	(United Kingdom)	Capt Philip Durham	577	17	53	70	12%
Thunderer	2-decker	74	Royal Navy Ensign	(United Kingdom)	Lieut John Stockham (acting captain)	611	4	12	16	3%
Defence	2-decker	74	Royal Navy Ensign	(United Kingdom)	Capt George Hope	599	7	29	36	6%
Prince	3-decker	98	Royal Navy Ensign	(United Kingdom)	Capt Richard Grindall	735	0	0	0	0%
Attached
Euryalus	Frigate	36	Royal Navy Ensign	(United Kingdom)	Capt Henry Blackwood	262	0	0	0	0%
Naiad	Frigate	38	Royal Navy Ensign	(United Kingdom)	Capt Thomas Dundas	333	0	0	0	0%
Phoebe	Frigate	36	Royal Navy Ensign	(United Kingdom)	Capt Thomas Bladen Capel (Note: Goodwin 2005, pp. 145–149 gives the captain's name as Capell)	256	0	0	0	0%
Sirius	Frigate	36	Royal Navy Ensign	(United Kingdom)	Capt William Prowse	273	0	0	0	0%
Pickle	Schooner	8	Royal Navy Ensign	(United Kingdom)	Lieut John Richards La Penotière	42	0	0	0	0%
Entreprenante	Cutter	10	Royal Navy Ensign	(France)	Lieut Robert Young	41	0	0	0	0%

== Franco-Spanish fleet ==
Just before the engagement the French and Spanish ships of the line had been sailing north to south. After wearing, the order of sailing was reversed, so that the former head was now the rear. During the battle itself the entire line broke into small units and individual ships. The combined fleet consisted of 40 vessels with 18 French ships of the line and 15 Spanish ships of the line.

Ships of the French-Spanish fleet
Ship	Type	Guns	Fleet	Const- ruction	Commanded by	Complement	Casualties				Outcome	Killed in wreck
Ship	Type	Guns	Fleet	Const- ruction	Commanded by	Complement	Killed	Wounded	Total	%	Outcome	Killed in wreck
Neptuno	2-decker	80	(Spain)	(Spain)	Captain Cayetano Valdés y Flores	800	37 (Note: Adkin 2005, p. 349 has 42.)	47	84	11%	Captured 21 Oct; Recaptured 23 Oct; Foundered 23 Oct	few
Scipion	2-decker	74	(France)	(France)	Captain Charles Berrenger	755	17	22	39	5%	Escaped; Captured 4 Nov	
Rayo	3-decker	100	(Spain)	(Spain)	Commodore Enrique MacDonnell	830	4	14	18	2%	Escaped; Captured 23 Oct; Foundered 26 Oct	many
Formidable	2-decker	80	(France)	(France)	Rear-Admiral Pierre Dumanoir le Pelley; Captain Jean-Marie Letellier	840	22	45	67	8%	Escaped; Captured 4 Nov	
Duguay-Trouin	2-decker	74	(France)	(France)	Captain Claude Touffet	755	20	24	44	6%	Escaped; Captured 4 Nov	
Mont Blanc	2-decker	74	(France)	(France)	Captain Guillaume-Jean-Noël de Lavillegris	755	20	20	40	5%	Escaped; Captured 4 Nov	
San Francisco de Asis	2-decker	74	(Spain)	(Spain)	Captain Luis Antonio Flórez y Pereyra	657	5	12	17	3%	Escaped; Wrecked 23 Oct	none
San Agustin	2-decker	74	(Spain)	(Spain)	Captain Felipe Jado Cagigal	711	181	201	382	54%	Captured 21 Oct; Destroyed 28 Oct	
Héros	2-decker	74	(France)	(France)	Commander Jean-Baptiste-Joseph-René Poulain^{(DOW)}	690	12	24	36	5%	Escaped	
Nuestra Señora de la Santísima Trinidad	4-decker	136	(Spain)	(Spain)	Rear-Admiral Baltasar Hidalgo de Cisneros; Captain Francisco Javier de Uriarte y Borja	1048	216	116	332	32%	Captured 21 Oct; Foundered 23 Oct	few
Bucentaure	2-decker	80	(France)	(France)	Vice-Admiral Pierre-Charles Villeneuve; Captain Jean-Jacques Magendie	888	197	85	282	32%	Captured 21 Oct; Recaptured 23 Oct; Wrecked 23 Oct	400 on Indomptable
Neptune	2-decker	80	(France)	(France)	Commodore Esprit-Tranquille Maistral	888	15	39	54	6%	Escaped	
Redoutable	2-decker	74	(France)	(France)	Captain Jean Jacques Étienne Lucas	643 (nominal 550-600)	300 (Note: Adkin 2005, p. 363 has 487 dead and 81 wounded from battle and storm.)	222	522	81%	Captured 21 Oct; Foundered 23 Oct	many 172 ?
San Leandro	2-decker	64	(Spain)	(Spain)	Captain José Quevedo	606	8	22	30	5%	Escaped	
San Justo	2-decker	74	(Spain)	(Spain)	Captain Miguel María Gastón de Iriarte	694	0	7	7	1%	Escaped	
Santa Ana	3-decker	112	(Spain)	(Spain)	Vice-Admiral Ignacio María de Álava; Captain José de Gardoqui	1189; 1053 nominal	95 (Note: Adkin 2005, p. 372 has 97 dead and 141 wounded.)	137	232	20%	Captured 21 Oct; Recaptured 23 Oct	
Indomptable	2-decker	80	(France)	(France)	Captain Jean Joseph Hubert^{†}	887	20	30	50 (Note: Estimated. Adkin 2005, p. 522 has 657 drowned when ship sank in storm.)	6%	Escaped; Wrecked 24 Oct (Note: ~1050 killed in wreck including survivors of Bucentaure who had been rescued by Indomptable)	657
Fougueux	2-decker	74	(France)	(France)	Captain Louis Alexis Baudoin^{†}	755	60	75	135 (Note: Est. 502 more drowned after battle: Adkin 2005, p. 522)	18%	Captured 21 Oct; Wrecked 22 Oct	502 (84% casualties)
Intrépide	2-decker	74	(France)	(Spain)	Captain Louis-Antoine-Cyprien Infernet	745	80	162	242 (Note: killed and wounded are estimated, as only numbers hit is given in Adkin 2005, pp. 351, 522)	32%	Captured 21 Oct; Destroyed 24 Oct	
Monarca	2-decker	74	(Spain)	(Spain)	Captain Teodoro de Argumosa Bourke	667	101	154	255	38%	Captured 21 Oct; Recaptured 22 Oct; Foundered 31 Oct	
Pluton	2-decker	74	(France)	(France)	Commodore Julien Cosmao	755	60	132	192	25%	Escaped	
Bahama	2-decker	74	(Spain)	(Spain)	Commodore Dionisio Alcalá Galiano^{†}	690	75	66	141	20%	Captured 21 Oct	
Aigle	2-decker	74	(France)	(France)	Captain Pierre-Paulin Gourrège^{†}	755	70	100	170 (Note: Estimated. Around 330 drowned on 23 October: Adkin 2005, p. 523)	23%	Captured 21 Oct; Wrecked 23 Oct	330
Montañés	2-decker	74	(Spain)	(Spain)	Captain Francisco Alsedo y Bustamante	715	20	29	49	7%	Escaped	
Algésiras	2-decker	74	(France)	(France)	Rear-Admiral Charles-René Magon de Médine^{†} Commander Laurent Tourneur	755	77	142	219	29%	Captured 21 Oct; Recaptured 23 Oct	
Argonauta	2-decker	80	(Spain)	(Spain)	Captain José Antonio Pareja^{(WIA)}	798	100	203	303	38%	Captured 21 Oct; Scuttled 21 Oct	
Swiftsure	2-decker	74	(France)	(United Kingdom)	Captain Charles-Eusèbe Lhospitalier de la Villemadrin	755	68	123	191	25%	Captured 21 Oct	
Argonaute	2-decker	74	(France)	(France)	Captain Jacques Épron-Desjardins	755	55	132	187	25%	Escaped	
San Ildefonso	2-decker	74	(Spain)	(Spain)	Captain Jose Ramón de Vargas y Varáez	716	34	148 (Note: 126 wounded according to)	182	25%	Captured 21 Oct	
Achille	2-decker	74	(France)	(France)	Captain Louis-Gabriel Deniéport^{†}	755	480	?	480	64%	Destroyed 21 Oct	
Principe de Asturias	3-decker	112	(Spain)	(Spain)	Admiral Federico Gravina^{(DOW)} (Note: Gravina died on 9 March 1806 due to wounds received in the battle from which he never recovered.); Rear-Admiral Antonio de Escaño; Commodore Ángel Rafael de Hore	1113	54	109 (Note: Adkin 2005, p. 391 has 52 dead, 110 wounded.)	163	15%	Escaped	
Berwick	2-decker	74	(France)	(United Kingdom)	Captain Jean-Gilles Filhol de Camas^{†}	755	75	125	200 (Note: Estimated. Only 58 survived foundering of ship 22 October. Adkin 2005, p. 522)	26%	Captured 21 Oct; Foundered 22 Oct	622
San Juan Nepomuceno	2-decker	74	(Spain)	(Spain)	Commodore Cosme Damián Churruca^{†}	693	103	151 (Note: Adkin 2005, p. 393 has 131.)	254	37%	Captured 21 Oct	
Attached
Cornélie	Frigate	40	(France)	(France)	Captain André-Jules-François de Martineng	Unknown	0	0	0	0%	Escaped	
Hermione	Frigate	40	(France)	(France)	Captain Jean-Michel Mahé	Unknown	0	0	0	0%	Escaped	
Hortense	Frigate	40	(France)	(France)	Captain Louis-Charles-Auguste Delamarre de Lamellerie	Unknown	0	0	0	0%	Escaped	
Rhin	Frigate	40	(France)	(France)	Captain Michel Chesneau	Unknown	0	0	0	0%	Escaped	
Thémis	Frigate	40	(France)	(France)	Captain Nicolas-Joseph-Pierre Jugan	Unknown	0	0	0	0%	Escaped	
Furet	Brig	18	(France)	(France)	Lieutenant Pierre-Antoine-Toussaint Dumay	130	0	0	0	0%	Escaped	
Argus	Brig	16	(France)	(France)	Lieutenant Yves-Francois Taillard	110	0	0	0	0%	Escaped	

== Losses ==
Below is a graph of the percentage of casualties plotted for each ship along the three battle columns. The graph is a construct only. The losses were incurred throughout the entire battle and after, most while the ships were not actually in that order. The order in the graph is shown as a convenience.

Three columns and a separate ship are shown on the horizontal axis, which represents units of conventional distance between ship positions. All units are assumed to be the same. There are three origin points, one for the beginning of each column and the Africa, which was not in the three.

The vertical axis shows percentage of casualties per ship. For example, casualties for the Victory are plotted at 20%. A casualty is someone who was known to have been wounded, someone who was known to have been killed, or someone missing in action and presumed drowned. The percentage is the ratio of casualties to ship's complement multiplied by 100. Casualties continued over the next few weeks as enemy crews rebelled, retook their ships, and were subdued. The graph covers only the main battle on the first day.

Casualties by Ship. Yellow = HMS Africa Green = British Weather Column, led by Nelson Grey = British Lee Column, led by Collingwood The number is the order in the column. Blue = French Red = Spanish. The number is the order in the line. Data for this chart are from the above table.

== Bibliography ==
- Adkin, Mark (2005). The Trafalgar Companion: A Guide to History's Most Famous Sea Battle and the Life of Admiral Lord Nelson. Aurum Press. ISBN 1-84513-018-9.
- "The Battle of Trafalgar". Broadside. 2012. Archived from the original on 27 April 2007.
- Clash of Steel (2007). "Order of Battle: The British Fleet". Archived from the original on 27 October 2007.
- Goodwin, Peter (2005). The Ships of Trafalgar: The British, French and Spanish Fleets October 1805. Naval Institute Press. ISBN 1-59114-824-3.
- Hannah, Peter (11 October 2021). A Treasure to the Service. ISBN 978-1-922629-73-9.
- Mortlock, Stephen (2017). "A Life on The Ocean Wave: Death and Disease in Nelson's Navy" (PDF). The Biomedical Scientist (28): 28–32. Archived from the original (PDF) on 2 July 2021.
- Winfield, Rif; Tredrea, John M; García-Torralba Pérez, Enrique & Blasco Felip, Manuel (2023). Spanish Warships in the Age of Sail 1700—1860: Design, Construction, Careers and Fates. Seaforth Publishing. ISBN 978-1-5267-9078-1.
