= Spanish ship San Leandro (1787) =

Spanish warship of 64 canons

History

Kingdom of Spain
- Name: San Leandro
- Ordered: 16 May 1786
- Builder: Royal Dockyard, Ferrol, Spain
- Launched: 27 November 1787
- In service: 1788
- Stricken: 1810
- Fate: Wrecked, 1814

General characteristics (as built)
- Type: San Fulgencio-class ship of the line
- Displacement: 2,427 long tons (2,466 t)
- Tons burthen: 1,676 (bm)
- Length: 181 Burgos feet (50.43 m (165 ft 5 in)) (gun deck)
- Beam: 49 Burgos ft, 6 in (13.79 m (45 ft 3 in))
- Depth of hold: 22 Burgos ft, 11 in (6.39 m (21 ft 0 in))
- Sail plan: Full-rigged ship
- Complement: 472
- Armament: 64 muzzle-loading, smoothbore guns: Lower gundeck: 26 × 24 pdrs; Upper gundeck: 28 × 12 pdrs; Quarterdeck: 10 × 8 pdrs; Forecastle: 2 × 8 pdrs

San Leandro was a 64-gun San Fulgencio-class ship of the line (navío) built for the Royal Spanish Navy (Real Armada) in the 1780s. Completed in 1787, the ship spent the next several years on sea trials and conducting maneuvers before she was placed in ordinary (reserve) at the end of 1790. San Leandro was recommissioned in 1793 and spent the first half of the year escorting convoys and searching for French ships after Spain declared war on France in March. She played a minor role in the Siege of Toulon and helped to evacuate troops and civilian refugees when the port was abandoned. The ship was transferred to the Spanish West Indies in 1794 and remained there until returning to Cádiz in 1804.

San Leandro participated in the Battle of Trafalgar in October 1805, but was never seriously engaged by a British ship during the battle. Nevertheless, she was lightly damaged during the battle and lost two masts in the severe storm that struck Cádiz several days later. Although she was repaired in 1806, San Leandro was blockaded in Cádiz by the British until the Spanish switched sides after France attempted to occupy Spain in 1808. The ship escorted a convoy to Venezuela and Mexico the following year. She was damaged by a storm on the return voyage and was abandoned at her moorings after arriving in Cuba for repairs in 1810. San Leandro was wrecked four years later.

== Description ==
The San Fulgencio-class ships were smaller versions of the earlier 74-gun San Ildefonso class. San Leandro was 181 Burgos feet (50.43 m (165 ft 5 in)) long at the lower gun deck and 160 Burgos feet, 3 in (44.65 m (146 ft 6 in)) at the keel. She had a beam of 51 Burgos feet, 4 inches (14.3 m (46 ft 11 in)) and a depth of hold of 22 Burgos feet, 11 inches (6.39 m (21 ft 0 in)). San Leandro displaced 2,427 long tons (2,466 t) and measured 1,541 tons burthen. The ship had three masts and was ship-rigged. Her crew normally consisted of 472 officers and men.

The muzzle-loading, smoothbore armament of the San Fulgencio class consisted of twenty-six 24-pounder guns on her lower gun deck, twenty-eight 12-pounders on her upper deck, twelve 8-pounders on her quarter deck and a pair of 8-pounders on her forecastle. In March 1793 her 12-pounders were replaced by 18-pounders and most of her 8-pounder guns had been replaced by obuses by 1805.

== Construction and career ==
The three San Fulgencio-class ships were ordered on 16 May 1786. The exact date that San Leandro was laid down at the Royal Dockyard at Ferrol is unknown, but she was launched on 27 November 1787. She arrived at Cádiz on 12 January 1788 and conducted her sea trials from Cartagena as part of a squadron under the command of Rear Admiral (Jefe de Escuadra) Cordova. The ship was careened and had her bottom coppered in June–July at the Arsenal de la Carraca near Cádiz. San Leandro was intermittently under Cordova's command for the next two years. She helped to transport troops from Cádiz to the North African enclave of Ceuta in August 1790. The ship was careened and recoppered upon her return at the Arsenal de la Carraca. San Leandro was placed in ordinary at Ferrol on 27 December.

The ship was recommissioned on 19 March 1793 and was ordered to patrol the Azores the following month. San Leandro captured the British brig Venus and escorted her prize into La Coruña on 17 April. She escorted merchantmen from Callao, Viceroyalty of Peru, into Cádiz on 7 May. The ship spent the next several months patrolling the Eastern Mediterranean searching for French ships as Spain had declared war on France in March. San Leandro arrived at Cartagena on 12 July and was assigned to the fleet commanded by Vice Admiral (Spanish: Teniente General) Juan de Lángara. The fleet sailed for Rosas Bay on 23 July and continued onwards to Toulon where it arrived on 29 August. The ship ferried Spanish troops and French Royalist refugees to Cartagena when the Anglo-Spanish forces at Toulon were forced to evacuate the city on 19 December. San Leandro spent the month of February 1794 patrolling for French ships in the Mediterranean before arriving at Cádiz on 13 March.

The ship was part of a fleet that departed Cádiz on 15 April, bound for Havana, Spanish Cuba, where it arrived two months later. San Leandro served in the Spanish West Indies for the next eight years. When the Spanish were forced to evacuate the Captaincy General of Santo Domingo by the terms of the Peace of Basel in 1795, the Spanish citizens were give a year to evacuate the colony. San Leandro transported some of these refugee families to Havana in July 1796. She was scheduled for careening at Havana in December 1801 and was recommissioned in June 1802. The ship was awaiting timber and supplies to recommission on 23 March 1804 and was able to sail from Havana to Cádiz in June–August. San Leandro was careened and recoppered in February 1805 at the Arsenal de la Carraca.

=== Battle of Trafalgar ===
Artist's conception of the situation at noon as Royal Sovereign was breaking into the Franco-Spanish line

Having fought the inconclusive Battle of Cape Finisterre on 22 July against a British fleet that attempted to intercept his combined Franco-Spanish fleet returning from the West Indies, Vice Admiral Pierre-Charles Villeneuve decided to disobey his orders to rendezvous with the French ships at Brest because his ships needed repairs and many crewmen were sick. He ultimately arrived at Cádiz on 20 August.

Like the British Royal Navy, the Royal Spanish Navy recruited soldiers and landsmen that required training and time at sea to become competent. Numbers of both exceeded requirements aboard the ships in Cádiz, but the critical shortage lay in insufficient numbers of trained naval artillerymen. San Leandro's crew consisted of 347 sailors, 202 infantrymen and 57 naval gunners.

The main body of the combined fleet was able to exit the Bay of Cádiz on 20 October. Once night fell, they could see British signal lights and flares at a distance that they estimated to be only two miles away. Villeneuve ordered his ships to form line of battle and then ordered a turn to the south east. In the darkness, these commands were more than the inexperienced crews could easily handle and the combined fleet could only form into several ragged lines. When dawn broke, Villeneuve saw that Nelson had put his ships in a position threaten his rear; Villeneuve decided to reverse course to protect his rear and move closer to refuge in Cádiz despite the very light winds that morning. His command ruined whatever semblance of order the combined fleet had as each ship had to maneuver as best they could as they each handled differently in the light winds. In addition, many of the bigger ships were driven to the east by the ocean's swell. Villeneuve's neat organization of three divisions, each of seven ships and Gravina's Squadron of Observation as the tactical reserve had been replaced by chaos with ships scattered across the sea.

By the time that Vice-Admiral Horatio Nelson's ships in two columns were approaching the combined fleet around noon, it had shaken itself into a rough curved line, although the ships were not evenly spaced apart with large gaps between clusters of ships. San Leandro had been assigned to the Villeneuve's center division and was the rearmost ship in that formation, although she was the fourteenth in line from the leading ship of the fleet. As Vice-Admiral Cuthbert Collingwood led the British fleet's southern, or lee, column in his 100-gun HMS Royal Sovereign, San Leandro was one of many ships that fired at Royal Sovereign at long range as she approached. After that ship became entangled with the Spanish 112-gun Santa Ana, San Leandro maneuvered to rake the British ship's bow.

As the British 98-gun Temeraire closed on the combined fleet's battle line, she was engaged by San Leandro and the Spanish 74-gun San Justo at long range. By about 1330, the two ships were firing on Belleisle. Later in the day, San Leandro helped to drive off the British ships pursuing the Spanish 112-gun Principe de Asturias. San Leandro was one of the few ships from the combined fleet that was able to reach the Bay of Cádiz the following morning. While the ship was only lightly damaged and had suffered eight men killed and twenty-two wounded during the battle, her masts had been damaged. The main and mizzen masts were blown out of the ship by a violent squall that arose that afternoon. She began repairs on 3 November which were completed by 28 April 1806. She spent the next several years blockaded in Cádiz until Spain switched sides on 14 June 1808 and the Peninsular War began.

=== Subsequent activities ===
San Leandro finished having her bottom recoppered in January 1809 and escorted a convoy to La Guaira, Venezuela, and Veracruz, Mexico, beginning on 9 April. On the return voyage, the convoy arrived in Havana, on 30 August with heavy storm damage. There it loaded bullion and goods worth eight million pesos. The ship was damaged in a storm off Bermuda on 6 November and had to put into San Juan, Puerto Rico, for temporary repairs and then proceeded to Havana for permanent repairs on 12 March 1810. Upon her arrival, San Leandro was placed in ordinary and disarmed. She was abandoned in place until the ship was wrecked in 1814.

== Bibliography ==
- Adkin, Mark (2007). The Trafalgar Companion: A Guide to History's Most Famous Sea Battle and the Life of Admiral Lord Nelson. London: Aurum Press. ISBN 978-1-84513-018-3.
- Adkins, Roy (2004). Trafalgar: The Biography of a Battle. Little Brown. ISBN 0-316-72511-0.
- Clayton, Tim & Craig, Phil (2005). Trafalgar: The Men, the Battle, the Storm. Hodder & Stoughton. ISBN 0-340-83028-X.
- Fremont-Barnes, Gregory (2005). Trafalgar 1805: Nelson's Crowning Victory. Campaign. Vol. 157. Osprey Publishing. ISBN 1-84176-892-8.
- Goodwin, Peter (2005). The Ships of Trafalgar: The British, French and Spanish Fleets October 1805. Naval Institute Press. ISBN 1-59114-824-3.
- Winfield, Rif; Tredrea, John M; García-Torralba Pérez, Enrique & Blasco Felip, Manuel (2023). Spanish Warships in the Age of Sail 1700—1860: Design, Construction, Careers and Fates. Seaforth Publishing. ISBN 978-1-5267-9078-1.
