= Jean-Baptiste-Joseph-René Poulain =

French Navy officer

Jean-Baptiste Joseph René Poulain (French pronunciation: [ʒɑ̃ batist ʒozɛf ʁəne pulɛ̃]; ? — Héros, off Trafalgar, 21 October 1805) was a French Navy officer.

== Career ==
As a Commander, he captained the 74-gun Héros. He took part in the Battle of Trafalgar, where he was mortally wounded at 13:15. Lieutenant Conor replaced him as captain of Héros.

== Notes and references ==
=== Bibliography ===
- Fonds Marine. Campagnes (opérations; divisions et stations navales; missions diverses). Inventaire de la sous-série Marine BB4. Tome deuxième : BB4 1 à 482 (1790-1826)
- Troude, Onésime-Joachim (1867). Batailles navales de la France. Vol. 3. Challamel ainé.
