= Spanish ship San Justo =

Spanish Navy vessel

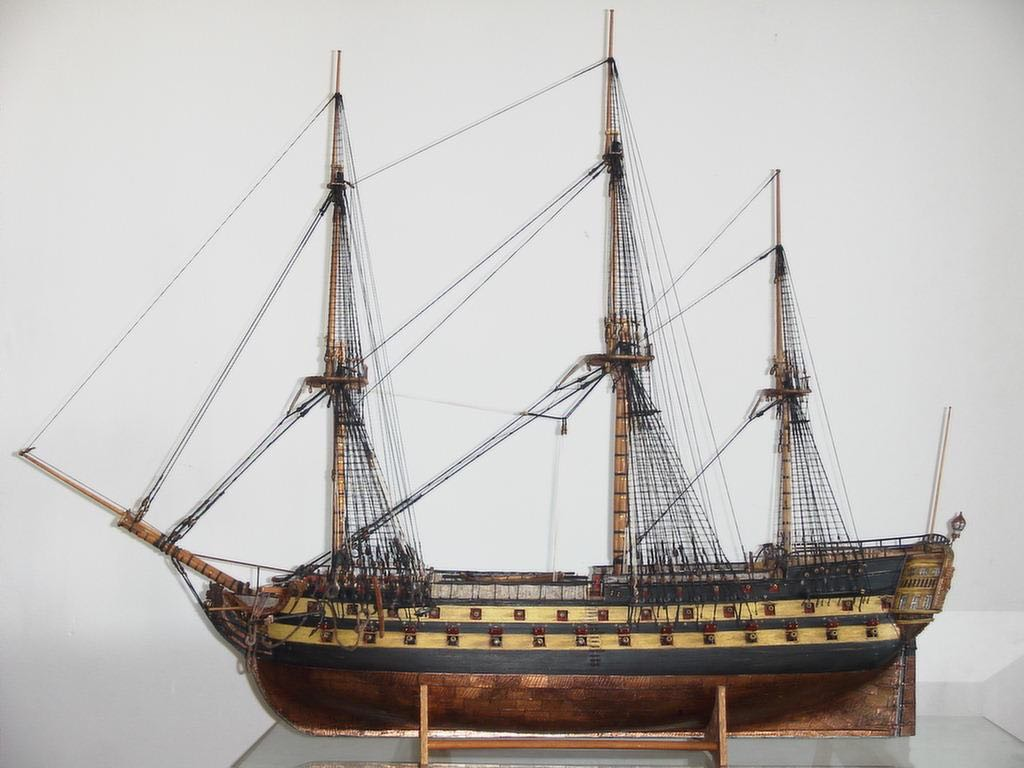
- Model of a 74-gun Spanish ship of the line

History

Spain
- Name: San Justo
- Builder: Cartagena, Spain
- Launched: 11 November 1779
- Commissioned: 16 November 1779
- Out of service: 1820
- Fate: Taken to pieces at Cartagena, 1828

General characteristics (as built)
- Type: 74-gun ship of the line
- Tons burthen: 1,676 bm
- Length: 196 Burgos ft (54.61 m (179 ft 2 in)) (gun deck)
- Beam: 51 Burgos ft, 4 in (14.3 m (46 ft 11 in))
- Depth of hold: 25 Burgos ft (6.97 m (22 ft 10 in))
- Sail plan: Full-rigged ship
- Complement: 550 officers and men
- Armament: 70 muzzle-loading, smoothbore guns (later 74): Lower gun deck: 28 × 24 pdrs; Upper gun deck: 30 × 18 pdrs; Quarterdeck: 8 × 8 pdrs; Forecastle: 4 × 8 pdrs

San Justo was a 70-gun San Joaquin-class ship of the line of the Spanish Navy launched in 1779. She fought at the Battle of Cape Spartel in 1782 and the Battle of Trafalgar in 1805. In the latter battle, under the command of Miguel María Gastón de Iriarte, she was placed in the centre division, but managed to avoid being heavily engaged throughout the battle and had few casualties – none killed and just seven injured.

== Description ==
The San Joaquin-class ships were designed as 70-gun ships of the line, but their armament was later augmented by four more guns. San Justo was 196 Burgos feet (54.61 m (179 ft 2 in)) long at the lower gun deck and 173 Burgos feet (48.2 m (158 ft 2 in)) at the keel. She had a beam of 51 Burgos feet, 4 inches (14.3 m (46 ft 11 in)) and a depth of hold of 25 Burgos feet (6.97 m (22 ft 10 in)). The ship measured 1,676 tons burthen. The ship had three masts and was ship-rigged. Her crew normally consisted of 472 officers and men.

The muzzle-loading, smoothbore armament of the San Joaquin class initially consisted of twenty-eight 24-pounder guns on her lower gun deck, thirty 18-pounders on her upper deck, eight 8-pounders on her quarterdeck and four more 8-pounders on their forecastle. Four more 8-pounders were added on the quarterdeck at a later date. The ships also carried ten obuses in a variety of sizes: four 30-pounders, two 24-pounders and four 4-pounders that were not included in her gun rating. Exactly when they were added to the ships is unknown.

== Bibliography ==
- Adkin, Mark (2005). The Trafalgar Companion: A Guide to History's Most Famous Sea Battle and the Life of Admiral Lord Nelson. Aurum. ISBN 1-84513-018-9.
- Adkins, Roy (2004). Trafalgar: The Biography of a Battle. Little, Brown. ISBN 0-316-72511-0.
- Clayton, Tim & Craig, Phil (2004). Trafalgar: The Men, the Battle, the Storm. Hodder & Stoughton. ISBN 0-340-83026-3.
- Fremont-Barnes, Gregory (2005). Trafalgar 1805: Nelson's Crowning Victory. Campaign. Vol. 157. Osprey Publishing. ISBN 1-84176-892-8.
- Goodwin, Peter (2005). The Ships of Trafalgar: The British, French and Spanish Fleets October 1805. Naval Institute Press. ISBN 1-59114-824-3.
- Winfield, Rif; Tredrea, John M; García-Torralba Pérez, Enrique & Blasco Felip, Manuel (2023). Spanish Warships in the Age of Sail 1700—1860: Design, Construction, Careers and Fates. Barnsley, UK: Seaforth Publishing. ISBN 978-1-5267-9078-1.
