= French ship Héros (1801) =

Ship of the line of the French Navy

- Scale model of Achille, sister ship of French ship Héros (1801), on display at the Musée national de la Marine in Paris.

History

France
- Name: Héros
- Namesake: Hero
- Builder: Rochefort
- Laid down: 1795
- Launched: 10 May 1801
- Captured: 1808

Spain
- Name: Heroe
- Fate: Broken up at Ferrol, 1839

General characteristics
- Class & type: Téméraire-class ship of the line
- Displacement: 3,069 tonneaux
- Tons burthen: 1,537 port tonneaux
- Length: 55.87 m (183 ft 4 in)
- Beam: 14.46 m (47 ft 5 in)
- Draught: 7.15 m (23.5 ft)
- Depth of hold: 7.15 m (23 ft 5 in)
- Sail plan: Full-rigged ship
- Crew: 705
- Armament: 74 guns: Lower gun deck: 28 × 36 pdr guns; Upper gun deck: 30 × 18 pdr guns; Forecastle and Quarterdeck: 16 × 8 pdr guns

Héros was a 74-gun Téméraire-class ship of the line built for the French Navy during the 1790s. Completed in 1801, she played a minor role in the Napoleonic Wars.

== Description ==
Designed by Jacques-Noël Sané, the Téméraire-class ships had a length of 55.87 metres (183 ft 4 in), a beam of 14.46 metres (47 ft 5 in) and a depth of hold of 7.15 metres (23 ft 5 in). The ships displaced 3,069 tonneaux and had a mean draught of 7.15 metres (23 ft 5 in). They had a tonnage of 1,537 port tonneaux. Their crew numbered 705 officers and ratings during wartime. They were fitted with three masts and ship rigged.

The muzzle-loading, smoothbore armament of the Téméraire class consisted of twenty-eight 36-pounder long guns on the lower gun deck and thirty 18-pounder long guns on the upper gun deck. On the quarterdeck and forecastle were a total of sixteen 8-pounder long guns. Beginning with the ships completed after 1787, the armament of the Téméraires began to change with the addition of four 36-pounder obusiers on the poop deck (dunette). Some ships had instead twenty 8-pounders.

== Construction and career ==
Héros was laid down at the Arsenal de Rochefort on 15 January 1795 and named on 24 March. The ship was launched on 10 May 1801, commissioned on 8 September and completed in October. She took part in the French occupation of Santo Domingo, notably ferrying Toussaint Louverture to France after his arrest.

She took part in the Battle of Trafalgar (21 October 1805) under Commander Poulain, and was one of the five French ships to survive the battle, although Poulain was killed and replaced by Lieutenant Conor. She subsequently returned to Cádiz. Héros stayed in Cádiz until she was captured by the Spanish in 1808. Renamed Heroe, she was broken up at Ferrol in 1839.
