= Battle of Trafalgar =

Battle of the Trafalgar campaign

- Part of the Trafalgar campaign of the War of the Third Coalition
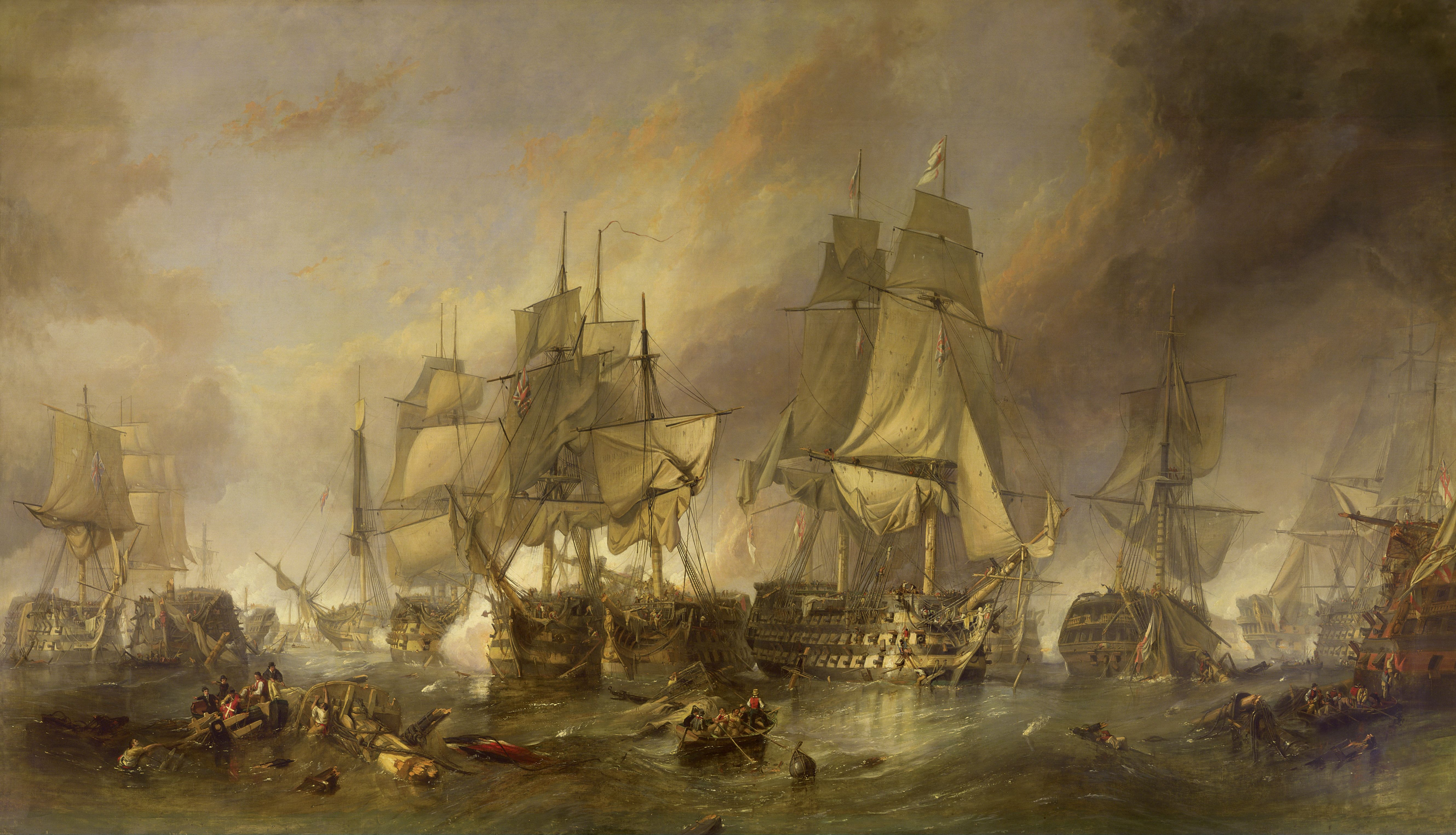
- The Battle of Trafalgar (1836)
| Date | 21 October 1805 |
| Location | Off Cape Trafalgar, Atlantic Ocean 36.25°N 6.20°W |
| Result | British victory |

Belligerents
| United Kingdom | France; Spain |

Commanders and leaders
| (United Kingdom of Great Britain and Ireland) Lord Nelson †; (United Kingdom of Great Britain and Ireland) Cuthbert Collingwood | (First French Empire) Pierre-Charles Villeneuve (surrendered); (Spain) Federico Gravina (DOW) |

Strength
| 27 ships of the line; 4 frigates; 1 schooner; 1 cutter (OOB) | 33 ships of the line; 5 frigates; 2 brigs (OOB) |

Casualties and losses
| 458 killed; 1,208 wounded | 4,395 killed; 2,541 wounded; 7,000–8,000 captured; 17 ships of the line captured; 1 ship of the line destroyed |
- Location within Europe

The Battle of Trafalgar was a fleet action fought on 21 October 1805 off Cape Trafalgar between the Royal Navy and a combined fleet of the French and Spanish navies during the Trafalgar campaign of the War of the Third Coalition. As part of Napoleon's planned invasion of the United Kingdom, the French and Spanish navies planned to take control of the English Channel and provide the French invasion army with safe passage to England. A Franco-Spanish fleet under French Vice-admiral Pierre-Charles Villeneuve sailed from Cádiz on 18 October 1805 and three days later encountered a British fleet under Vice-Admiral of the White Horatio Nelson, 1st Viscount Nelson in the Atlantic along southwestern Spain.

Nelson sailed his fleet directly at the Franco-Spanish line of battle's flank in two columns, hoping to break the line into pieces. Villeneuve foresaw Nelson's tactic but failed to prepare for it; the crews of the French and Spanish ships in contrast to their British counterparts were inexperienced, poorly trained and suffered from low morale. Nelson's plan worked brilliantly with both columns splitting the Franco-Spanish fleet in three groups, isolating the rear. The Franco-Spanish vanguard sailed ahead while attempting to turn back, leaving the British temporarily superior in number against the remainder of Villeneuve's fleet. 18 French and Spanish ships were ultimately captured or destroyed while the British lost none.

Nelson's approach exposed the leading ships of the British columns to intense crossfire as they approached the Franco-Spanish lines. Nelson's own HMS Victory led the front column and was almost knocked out of action. Nelson was shot by French marksman during the battle and died shortly before it ended. Villeneuve was captured along with his flagship and later attended Nelson's state funeral while a captive on parole in Britain. Following the battle, the senior surviving Spanish commander, Lieutenant-general Federico Gravina, led part of the surviving Franco-Spanish fleet away from the storm; he died six months later of wounds sustained during the battle.

Nelson's victory against the odds and death during battle secured his place as a British national hero. His signal to the fleet shortly before the battle, "England expects that every man will do his duty", is regularly quoted and paraphrased. The victory confirmed Britain's naval supremacy in the Napoleonic Wars and was achieved in part through Nelson's departure from prevailing sailing ship tactics. The battle led to the definitive end of any real efforts by Napoleon to invade Britain, and although it had a limited impact on the War of the Third Coalition resulted in Britain's command of the sea not being tested for over a century.

== Background ==
In 1805, the First French Empire, under Napoleon Bonaparte, was the dominant military land power on the European continent, while the British Royal Navy, through disruptive blockades, prevailed over the seas. During the course of the war, the British imposed a naval blockade on France, which affected trade and kept the French from fully mobilising their naval resources. Despite several successful evasions of the blockade by the French navy, it failed to inflict a major defeat upon the British, who were able to attack French interests at home and abroad with relative ease.

When the Third Coalition declared war on France, after the short-lived Peace of Amiens, Napoleon renewed his determination to invade Britain. To allow his invasion flotilla to reach England, he needed to wrest control of the English Channel from the Royal Navy.

The main French fleets were at Brest in Brittany and at Toulon on the Mediterranean coast. Other ports on the French Atlantic coast harboured smaller squadrons. France and Spain were allied, so the Spanish fleet based in Cádiz and Ferrol was also available.

The British possessed an experienced and well-trained corps of naval officers. (Note: When offered his pick from the Navy List by Lord Barham (the First Lord of the Admiralty), Nelson replied "Choose yourself, my lord, the same spirit actuates the whole profession; you cannot choose wrong" Allen (1853), p. 210.) By contrast, some of the best officers in the French navy had been executed or had left the service during the early part of the French Revolution.

Vice-admiral Pierre-Charles Villeneuve had taken command of the French Mediterranean Squadron following the death of Vice-admiral Louis-René Levassor de Latouche Tréville. There had been more competent officers, but they had either been employed elsewhere or had fallen from Napoleon's favour. Villeneuve had shown a distinct reluctance for facing the Royal Navy after the French defeat at the Battle of the Nile in 1798.

Napoleon's naval plan in 1805 was for the French and Spanish fleets in the Mediterranean and Cádiz to break through the blockade and join forces in the Caribbean. They would then return, assist the fleet in Brest to emerge from the blockade, and together clear the English Channel of Royal Navy ships, ensuring a safe passage for the invasion barges.

The admirals of the campaign

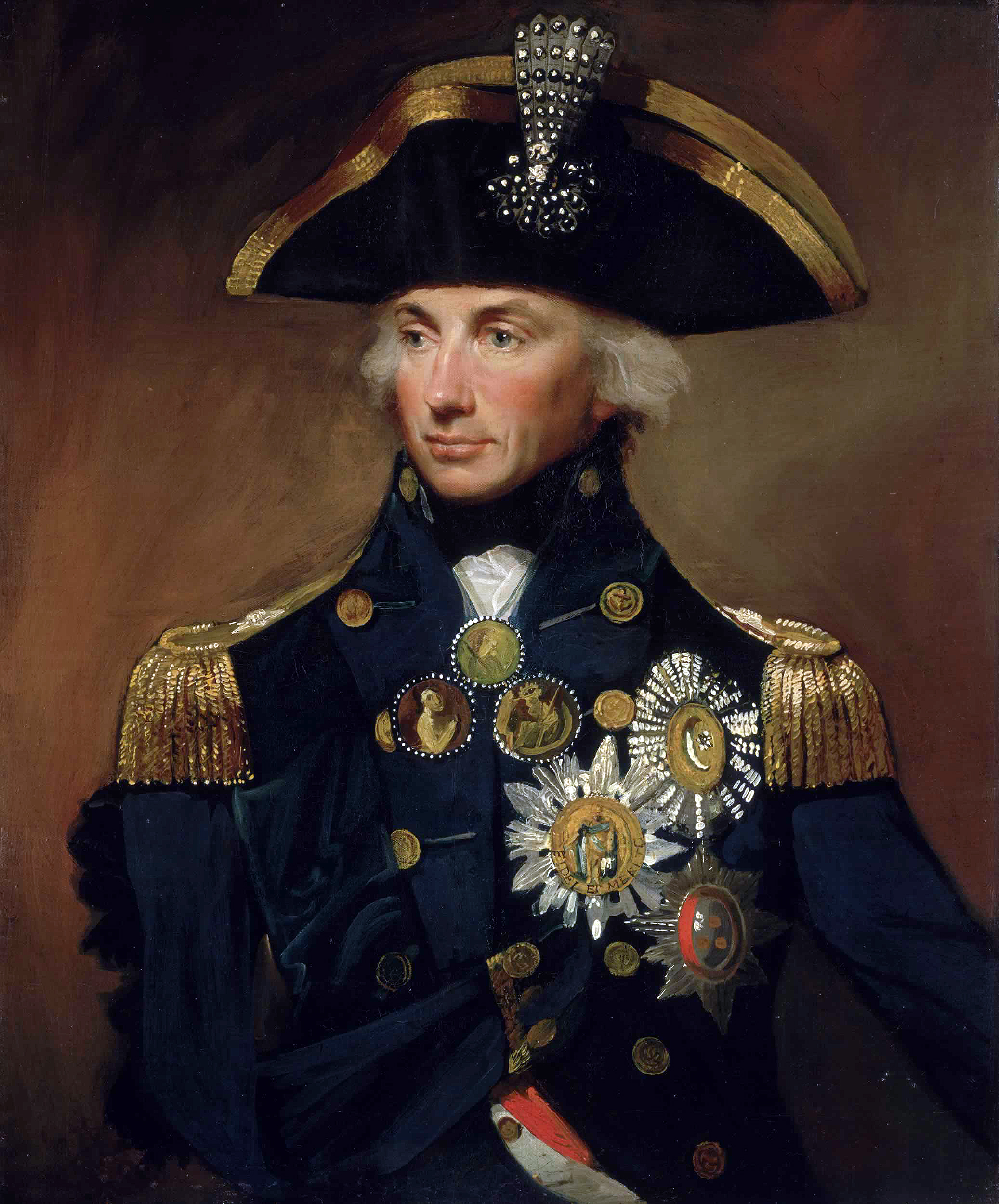
Vice-Admiral of the White Lord Nelson, by Lemuel Francis Abbott

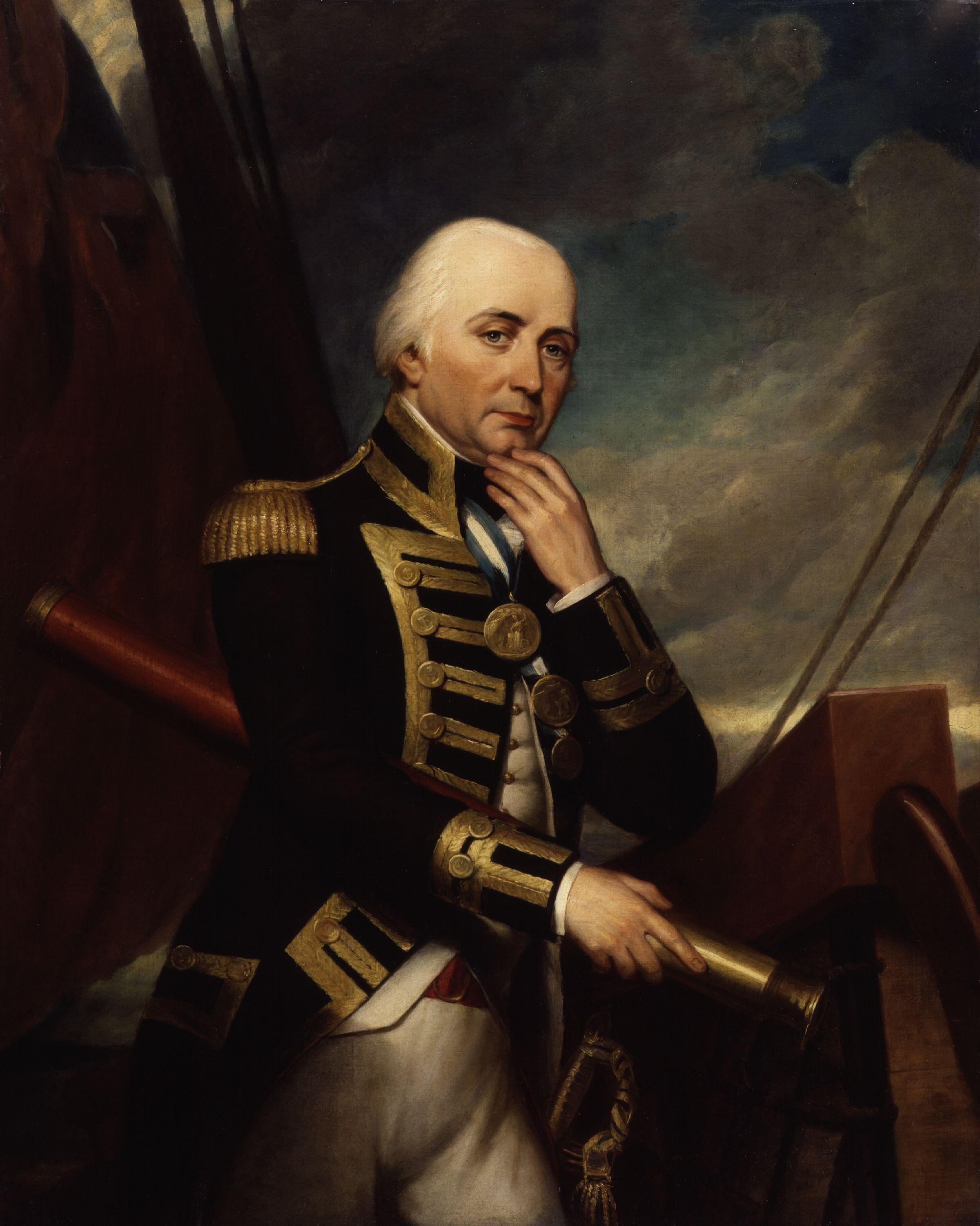
Vice Admiral of the Blue Cuthbert Collingwood

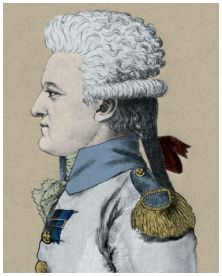
Vice-admiral Pierre-Charles Villeneuve

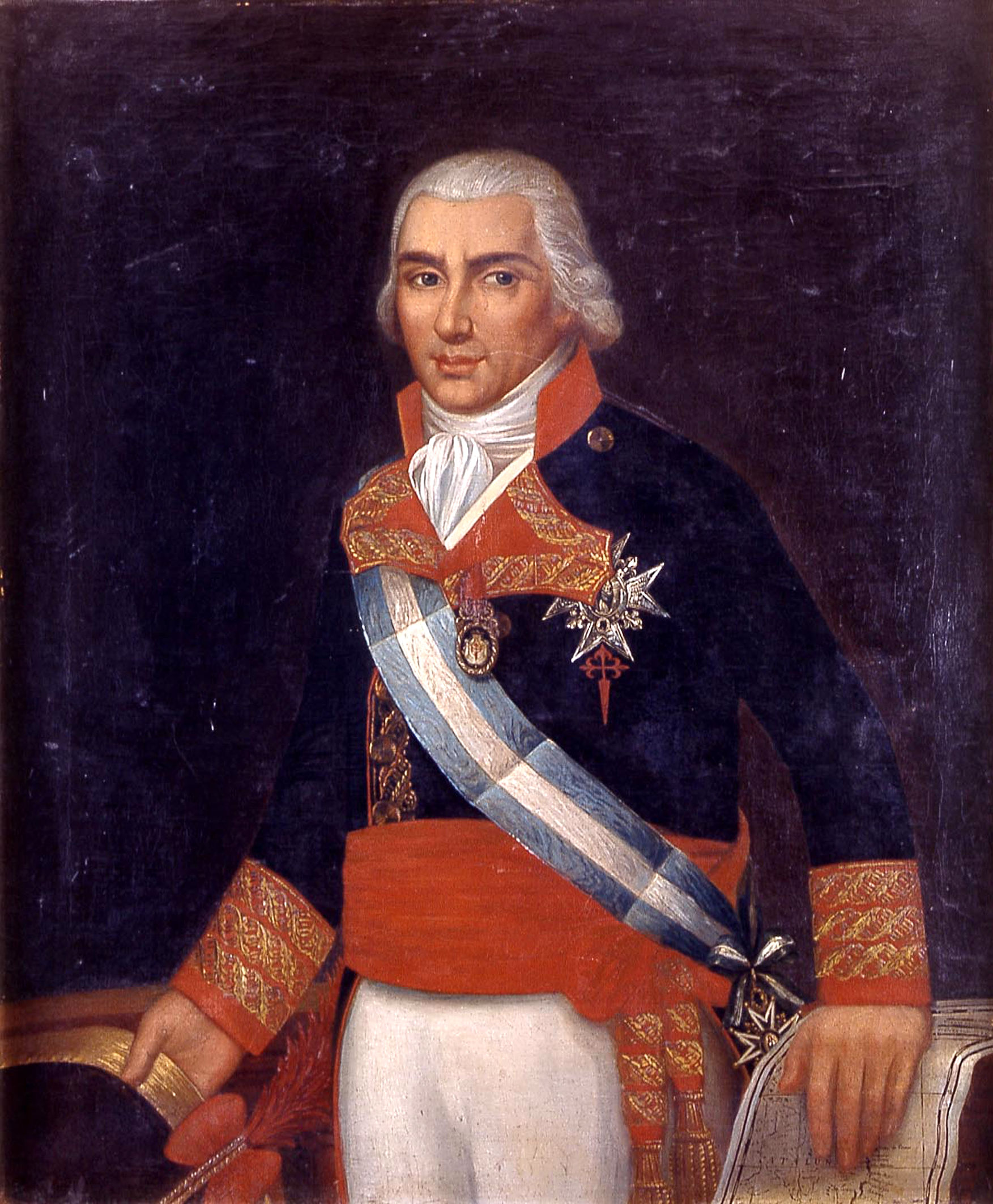
Lieutenant-general Federico Gravina

=== Pursuit of Villeneuve ===
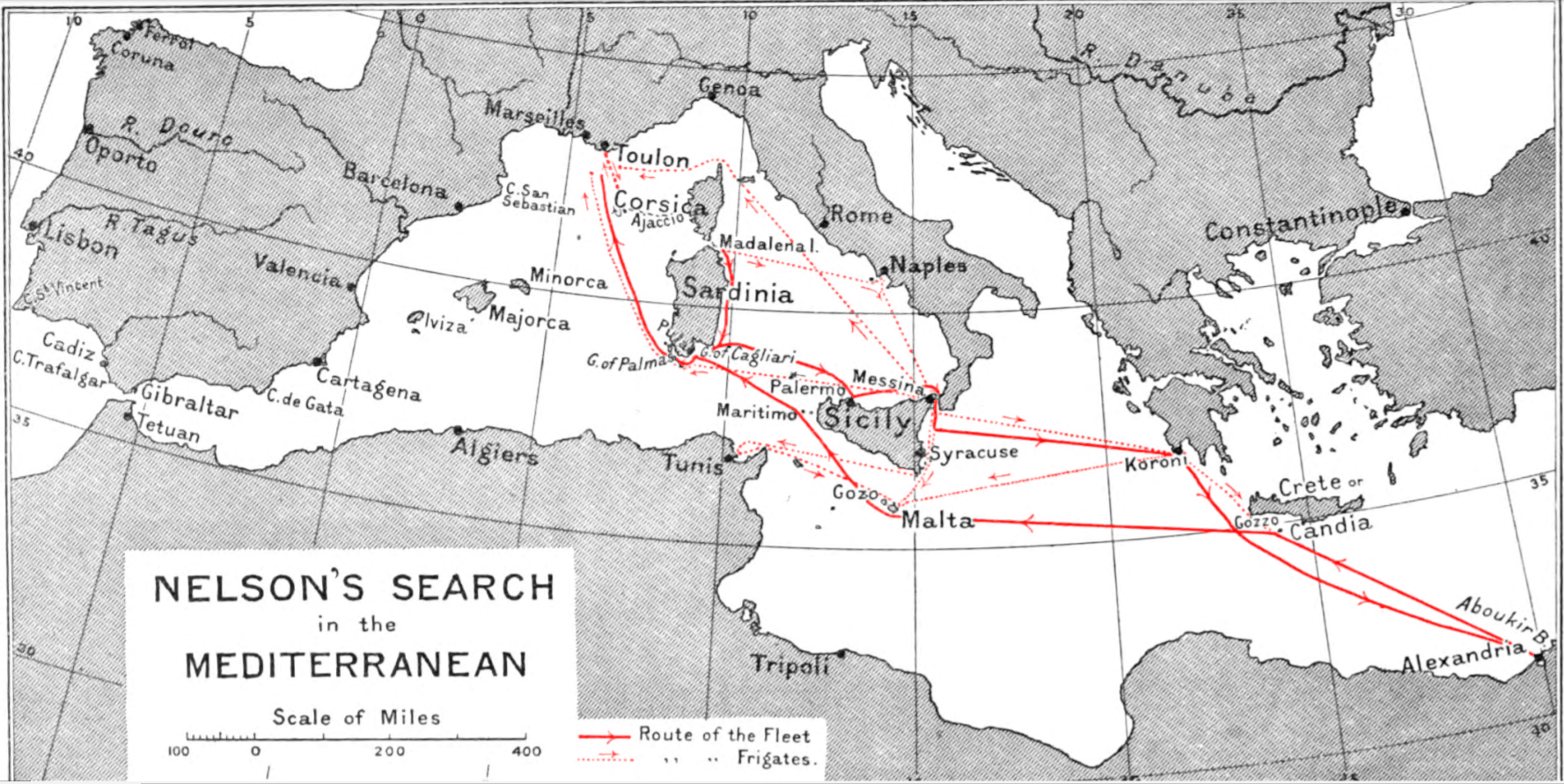
Nelson's search in the Mediterranean

Early in 1805, Vice-Admiral of the White Horatio Nelson, 1st Viscount Nelson commanded the British fleet blockading the Mediterranean port of Toulon. Unlike William Cornwallis, who maintained a close blockade off Brest with the Channel Fleet, Nelson adopted a loose blockade in hope of luring the French out to battle, saying, "to be able to get at the enemy you must let them come out to you, if you cannot get at them." However, Villeneuve's fleet successfully evaded Nelson's when the British were blown off station by storms. Nelson commenced a search of the Mediterranean, supposing that the French intended to make for Egypt, but Villeneuve instead took his fleet through the Strait of Gibraltar, rendezvoused with the Spanish fleet in Cádiz, and sailed as planned for the Caribbean. Once Nelson realised that the French were crossing the Atlantic, he set off in pursuit. (Note: Admirals of the time, due to the slowness of communications, were given considerable autonomy to make strategic as well as tactical decisions.)

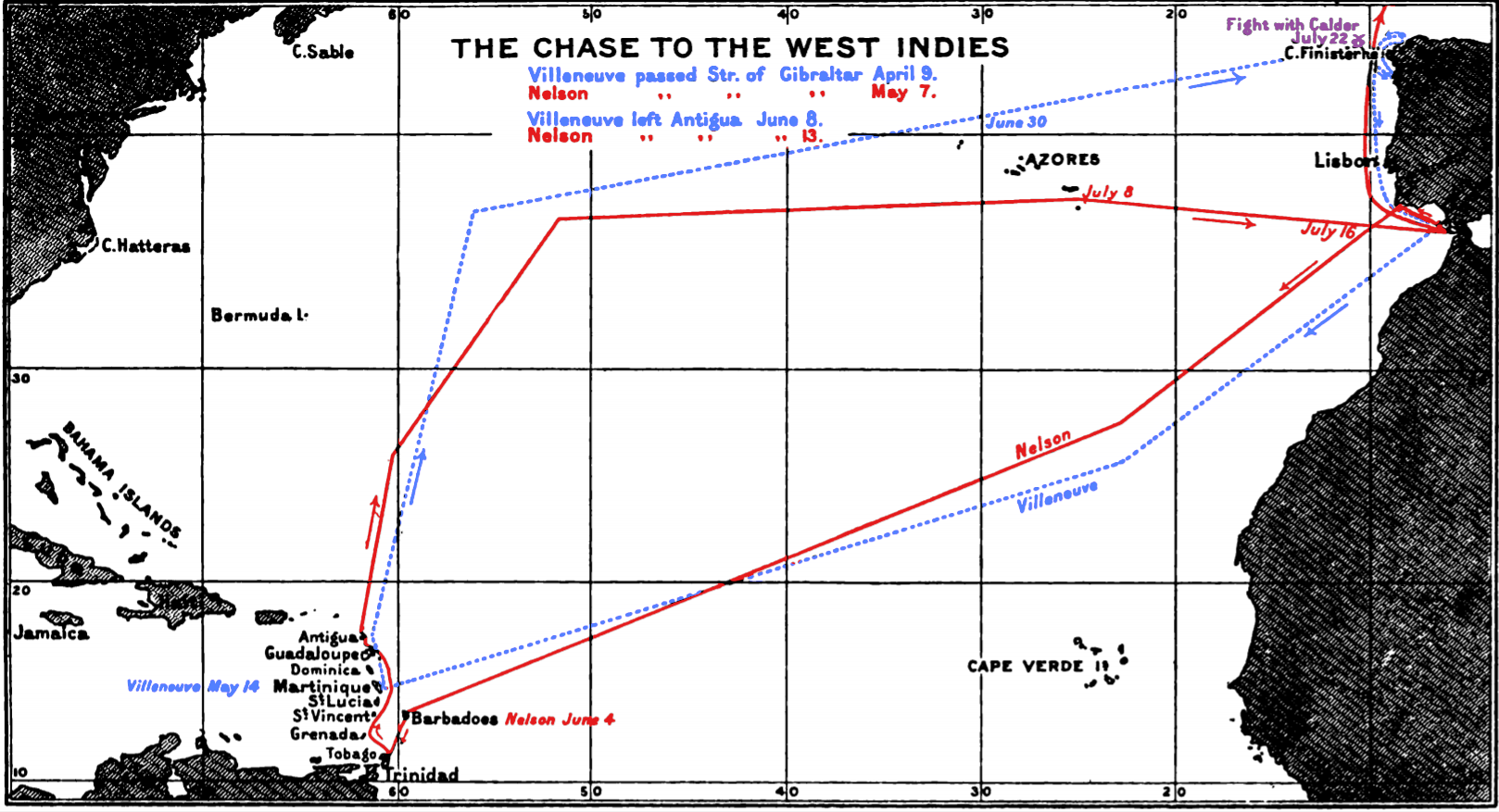
The Chase to the West Indies

He missed them by just days in the West Indies as a result of false information.

=== Cádiz ===
Having lured the British to the West Indies, Villeneuve returned from the Caribbean to Europe, intending to break the blockade at Brest. Nelson, still in fear for Egypt, made to return to the Mediterranean. The fast sailing corvette taking word of his plans back to the admiralty spotted the French heading further north. On receiving this intelligence Lord Barham immediately ordered Admiral Cornwallis to combine his squadron with that of Vice-Admiral Robert Calder off Ferrol and to stretch out thirty to forty leagues into the Atlantic to block the French from entering the Channel.

Calder intercepted the French resulting in an inconclusive engagement during the Battle of Cape Finisterre in which two of the Spanish ships were captured. Villeneuve abandoned his plan and sailed back to Ferrol in northern Spain. There he received orders from Napoleon to return to Brest according to the main plan.

Napoleon's invasion plans for Britain depended on having a sufficiently large number of ships of the line protecting his port of Boulogne on the English Channel. This would require Villeneuve's force of 33 ships to join Vice-Admiral Honoré Joseph Antoine Ganteaume's fleet of 21 ships at Brest, along with a squadron of five ships under Captain Allemand, which would have given him a combined force of 59 ships of the line.

When Villeneuve set sail from Ferrol on 10 August, he was under orders from Napoleon to sail northward toward Brest. Instead, he worried that the British were observing his manoeuvres, so on 11 August, he sailed southward towards Cádiz on the southwestern coast of Spain. With no sign of Villeneuve's fleet, on 25 August, the three French army corps' invasion force near Boulogne broke camp and marched into Germany, where it was later engaged. This ended the immediate threat of invasion.

The same month, Admiral Lord Nelson returned home to Britain after two years of duty at sea. He remained ashore for 25 days and was warmly received by his countrymen. Word reached Britain on 2 September about the combined French and Spanish fleet in Cádiz harbour. Nelson had to wait until 15 September before his ship, HMS Victory, was ready to sail.

On 15 August, Cornwallis decided to detach 20 ships of the line from the fleet guarding the English Channel to sail southward to engage the French and Spanish forces in Spain, leaving the Channel with only 11 ships of the line. The detached force formed the nucleus of the British fleet at Trafalgar. This fleet, under Calder's command, reached Cádiz on 15 September. Nelson joined the fleet on 28 September to take command.

Hoping to lure the combined Franco-Spanish force out from Cádiz harbour and engage it in a decisive battle, Nelson kept his main force out of sight approximately 50 miles (80 km) offshore and sent a squadron of frigates (faster, but too small for the line of battle) to keep watch on the harbour. This was led by Captain Blackwood aboard HMS Euryalus, with five frigates, a schooner, and a brig.

=== Supply situation ===
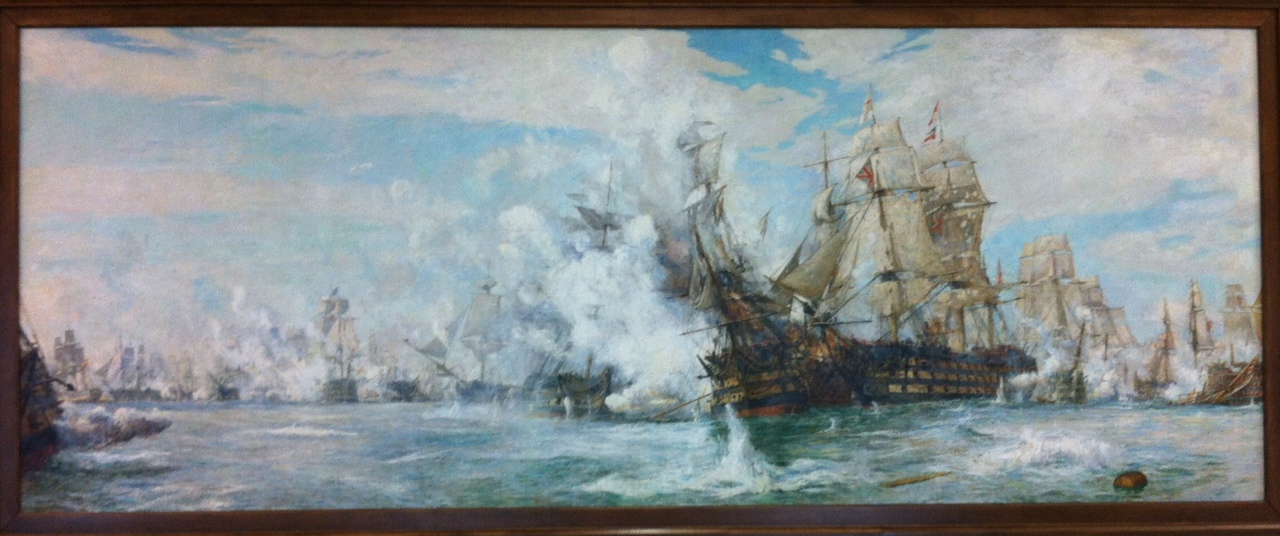
Battle of Trafalgar by William Lionel Wyllie, Juno Tower, CFB Halifax, Nova Scotia, Canada

Nelson's fleet badly needed provisioning. On 2 October, five ships of the line, HMS Queen, Canopus, Spencer, Zealous, Tigre, and the frigate HMS Endymion were dispatched to Gibraltar under Rear-Admiral Sir Thomas Louis for supplies.

These ships were later diverted for convoy duty in the Mediterranean, although Nelson had expected them to return. Similarly, HMS Superb under Captain Richard Goodwin Keats had been sent to the dockyard for a re-fit after four years at sea, including the chase of Villeneuve, and was expected to return to the fleet where Keats was to be Nelson's second, but the ship was not released in time. Other British ships continued to arrive, and by 15 October the fleet was up to full strength for the battle. Nelson also lost Calder's flagship, the 98-gun Prince of Wales, which he sent home as Calder had been recalled by the Admiralty to face a court-martial for his apparent lack of aggression during the engagement off Cape Finisterre on 22 July.

Meanwhile, Villeneuve's fleet in Cádiz was also suffering from a serious supply shortage that could not be easily rectified by the cash-poor French. The blockade maintained by the British fleet had made it difficult for the Franco-Spanish allies to obtain stores, and their ships were ill-equipped. Villeneuve's ships were also more than two thousand men short of the force needed to sail. These were not the only problems faced by the Franco-Spanish fleet. The main French ships of the line had been kept in harbour for years by the British blockade with only brief sorties. The French crews included few experienced sailors, and, as most of the crew had to be taught the elements of seamanship on the few occasions when they got to sea, gunnery was neglected. The hasty voyage across the Atlantic and back used up vital supplies. Villeneuve's supply situation began to improve in October, but news of Nelson's arrival made Villeneuve reluctant to leave port. His captains had held a vote on the matter and decided to stay in harbour.

On 16 September, Napoleon gave orders for the French and Spanish ships at Cádiz to put to sea at the first favourable opportunity, join with seven Spanish ships of the line then at Cartagena, go to Naples and land the soldiers they carried to reinforce his troops there, then fight decisively if they met a numerically inferior British fleet.

== Fleets ==
=== British ===
| | British | Franco- Spanish |
|---|---|---|
| First rates | 3 | 4 |
| Second rates | 4 | 0 |
| Third rates | 20 | 29 |
| Total ships of the line | 27 | 33 |
| Other ships | 6 | 7 |

On 21 October, Admiral Nelson had 27 ships of the line with 2148 cannons, and a total of 17000 crewmen and marines under his command. Nelson's flagship, HMS Victory, captained by Thomas Masterman Hardy, was one of three 100-gun first-rates in his fleet. He also had four 98-gun second-rates and 20 third-rates. One of the third-rates was an 80-gun vessel, and 16 were 74-gun vessels. The remaining three were 64-gun ships, which were being phased out of the Royal Navy at the time of the battle. Nelson also had four frigates of 38 or 36 guns, a 12-gun schooner and a 10-gun cutter.

=== Franco-Spanish ===
Against Nelson, Vice-Admiral Villeneuve, sailing on his flagship Bucentaure, fielded 33 ships of the line, including some of the largest in the world at the time. The Spanish contributed four first-rates to the fleet – three of these ships, one at 130 guns (Santísima Trinidad) and two at 112 guns (Príncipe de Asturias, Santa Ana), were much larger than anything under Nelson's command. The fourth first-rate carried 100 guns. The fleet had six 80-gun third-rates (four French and two Spanish), and one Spanish 64-gun third-rate. The remaining 22 third-rates were 74-gun vessels, of which 14 were French and eight Spanish. In total, the Spanish contributed 15 ships of the line and the French 18 along with some 30000 men and marines manning 2632 cannons. The fleet also included five 40-gun frigates and two 18-gun brigs, all French.

== Prelude ==
=== Nelson's plan ===
The prevailing tactical orthodoxy at the time involved manoeuvring to approach the enemy fleet in a single line of battle and then engaging broadside in parallel lines. In previous times, fleets had usually engaged in a mixed mêlée of chaotic one-on-one battles. One reason for the development of the line of battle formation was to facilitate control of the fleet: if all the ships were in line, signalling during battle became possible. The line also allowed either side to disengage by breaking away in formation; if the opponent chose to continue, their line would be broken as well. This often led to inconclusive battles, or allowed the losing side to minimise its losses. Facing a numerically superior Franco-Spanish line, Nelson wanted to break it into a chaotic mêlée which would force his opponents to fight his well-trained crews ship to ship.

Nelson's solution was to cut the opposing line in three. Approaching in two columns sailing perpendicular to the Franco-Spanish fleet's line, one towards the centre of the opposing line and one towards the trailing end, his ships would surround the middle third, and force them to fight to the end. Nelson hoped specifically to cut the line just in front of the French flagship, Bucentaure; the isolated ships in front of the break would not be able to see the flagship's signals, which he hoped would take them out of combat while they re-formed. This echoed the tactics used by Admiral Duncan at the Battle of Camperdown and Admiral Jervis at the Battle of Cape St. Vincent, both in 1797.

The Battle of Trafalgar painted by Samuel Drummond in 1825

The plan had three principal advantages:

- First, the British fleet would close with the Franco-Spanish as quickly as possible, preventing their escape.
- Second, it would quickly bring on a mêlée and frantic battle by breaking the Franco-Spanish line and inducing a series of individual ship-to-ship actions, in which the British knew they were likely to prevail. Nelson knew that the superior seamanship, faster gunnery and better morale of his crews were great advantages.
- Third, it would bring a decisive concentration on the rear of the Franco-Spanish fleet. The ships in the van of the French and Spanish fleet would have to turn back to support the rear, which would take a long time. Additionally, once the line had been broken, their ships would be relatively defenceless against powerful broadsides from the British fleet, and it would take them a long time to reposition to return fire.

The main drawback of attacking head-on was that as the leading British ships approached, the Franco-Spanish Combined Fleet would be able to direct raking broadside fire at their bows, to which they would be unable to reply. To lessen the time the fleet was exposed to this danger, Nelson had his ships make all available sail (including stunsails), yet another departure from the norm. He was also well aware that French and Spanish gunners were ill-trained and would have difficulty firing accurately from a moving gun platform. The Combined Fleet was sailing across a heavy swell, causing the ships to roll heavily and exacerbate the problem. Nelson's plan was a carefully calculated gamble.

During the blockade off the coast of Spain in October, Nelson instructed his captains, over two dinners aboard Victory, on his plan for the approaching battle. In an animated conversation with his favourite captain, Richard Goodwin Keats, who was expected to be his second in the forthcoming battle, Nelson explained a refined battle plan whilst the two were walking in the garden of Merton in August 1805. The order of sailing, in which the fleet was arranged when the opposing fleet was first sighted, was to be the order of the ensuing action so that no time would be wasted in forming two lines. The first, led by his second-in-command Vice-Admiral of the Blue Cuthbert Collingwood, was to sail into the rear of the Franco-Spanish line, while the other, led by Nelson, was to sail into the centre and vanguard. In preparation for the battle, Nelson ordered the ships of his fleet to be painted in a distinctive yellow and black pattern (later known as the Nelson Chequer) that would make them easy to distinguish from their opponents.

Nelson was careful to point out that something had to be left to chance. Nothing is sure in a sea battle, so he left his captains free from all hampering rules by telling them that "No captain can do very wrong if he places his ship alongside that of the enemy." In short, circumstances would dictate the execution, subject to the guiding rule that the Franco-Spanish fleet's rear was to be cut off and superior force concentrated on that part of the line.

Admiral Villeneuve himself expressed his belief that Nelson would use some sort of unorthodox attack, presciently speculating that Nelson would drive right at his line. But his long game of cat and mouse with Nelson had worn him down, and he was suffering from a loss of nerve. Fearing that his inexperienced officers would be unable to maintain formation in more than one group, he chose to keep the single line that became Nelson's target.

=== Departure ===
The Combined Fleet of French and Spanish warships anchored in Cádiz under the leadership of Admiral Villeneuve was in disarray. On 16 September 1805 Villeneuve received orders from Napoleon to sail the Combined Fleet from Cádiz to Naples. At first, Villeneuve was optimistic about returning to the Mediterranean, but soon had second thoughts. A war council was held aboard his flagship, Bucentaure, on 8 October. While some of the French captains wished to obey Napoleon's orders, the Spanish captains and other French officers, including Villeneuve, thought it best to remain in Cádiz. Villeneuve changed his mind yet again on 18 October 1805, ordering the Combined Fleet to sail immediately even though there were only very light winds.

The sudden change was prompted by a letter Villeneuve had received on 18 October, informing him that Vice-Admiral François Rosily had arrived in Madrid with orders to take command of the Combined Fleet. Stung by the prospect of being disgraced before the fleet, Villeneuve resolved to go to sea before his successor could reach Cádiz. At the same time, he received intelligence that a detachment of six British ships (Admiral Louis' squadron), had docked at Gibraltar, thus weakening the British fleet. This was used as the pretext for sudden change.

The weather, however, suddenly turned calm following a week of gales. This slowed the progress of the fleet leaving the harbour, giving the British plenty of warning. Villeneuve had drawn up plans to form a force of four squadrons, each containing both French and Spanish ships. Following their earlier vote on 8 October to stay put, some captains were reluctant to leave Cádiz, and as a result they failed to follow Villeneuve's orders closely and the fleet straggled out of the harbour in no particular formation.

It took most of 20 October for Villeneuve to get his fleet organised; it eventually set sail in three columns for the Straits of Gibraltar to the southeast. That same evening, Achille spotted a force of 18 British ships of the line in pursuit. The fleet began to prepare for battle and during the night, they were ordered into a single line. The following day, Nelson's fleet of 27 ships of the line and four frigates was spotted in pursuit from the northwest with the wind behind it. Villeneuve again ordered his fleet into three columns, but soon changed his mind and restored a single line. The result was a sprawling, uneven formation.

At 5:40 a.m. on 21 October, the British were about 21 miles (34 km) to the northwest of Cape Trafalgar, with the Franco-Spanish fleet between the British and the Cape. About 6 a.m., Nelson gave the order to prepare for battle. At 8 a.m., the British frigate Euryalus, which had been keeping watch on the Combined Fleet overnight, observed the British fleet still "forming the lines" in which it would attack.

At 8 a.m., Villeneuve ordered the fleet to wear together (turn about) and return to Cádiz. This reversed the order of the allied line, placing the rear division under Rear-Admiral Pierre Dumanoir le Pelley in the vanguard. The wind became contrary at this point, often shifting direction. The very light wind rendered manoeuvring virtually impossible for all but the most expert seamen. The inexperienced crews had difficulty with the changing conditions, and it took nearly an hour and a half for Villeneuve's order to be completed. The French and Spanish fleet now formed an uneven, angular crescent, with the slower ships generally to leeward and closer to the shore.

By 11 a.m., Nelson's entire fleet was visible to Villeneuve, drawn up in two parallel columns. The two fleets would be within range of each other within an hour. Villeneuve was concerned at this point about forming up a line, as his ships were unevenly spaced in an irregular formation drawn out nearly 5 miles (8 km) long as Nelson's fleet approached.

As the British drew closer, they could see that the combined French and Spanish fleet was not sailing in a tight order, but in irregular groups. Nelson could not immediately make out the French flagship as the French and Spanish were not flying command pennants.

Nelson was outnumbered and outgunned, with the opposing fleet totalling nearly 30000 men and 2568 guns to Nelson's 17000 men and 2148 guns. The Franco-Spanish fleet also had six more ships of the line, and so could more readily combine their fire. There was no way for some of Nelson's ships to avoid being "doubled on" or even "trebled on".

As the two fleets drew closer, anxiety began to build among officers and sailors; one British sailor described the approach thus:

During this momentous preparation, the human mind had ample time for meditation and conjecture, for it was evident that the fate of England rested on this battle.

== Battle ==
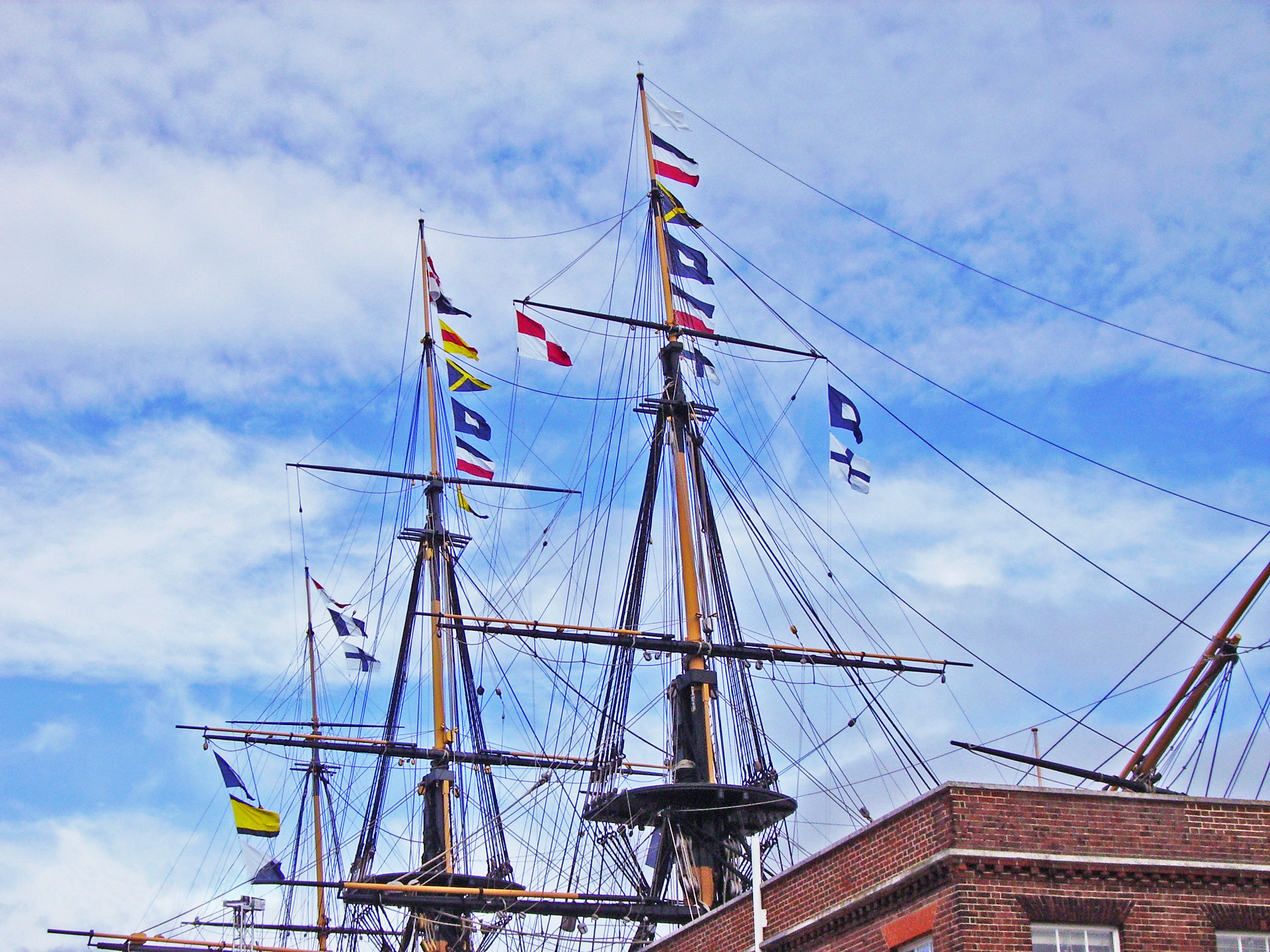
Nelson's signal, "England expects that every man will do his duty", flying from Victory on the bicentenary of the Battle of Trafalgar

Nelson's signal

=== Commencement ===
The battle progressed largely according to Nelson's plan. At 11:45, Nelson sent the flag signal, "England expects that every man will do his duty".

His Lordship came to me on the poop, and after ordering certain signals to be made, about a quarter to noon, he said, "Mr. Pasco, I wish to say to the fleet, 'England confides that every man will do his duty'" and he added "You must be quick, for I have one more to make which is for close action." I replied, "If your Lordship will permit me to substitute 'expects' for 'confides' the signal will soon be completed, because the word 'expects' is in the vocabulary, and 'confides' must be spelt," His Lordship replied, in haste, and with seeming satisfaction, "That will do, Pasco, make it directly."

The term "England" was widely used at the time to refer to the United Kingdom; the British fleet included significant contingents from Ireland, Scotland, and Wales. Unlike the photographic depiction above, this signal would have been shown on the mizzen mast only and would have required 12 lifts.

As the battle opened, the French and Spanish were in a ragged curved line headed north. As planned, the British fleet was approaching the Franco-Spanish line in two columns. Leading the northern, windward column in Victory was Nelson, while Collingwood in the 100-gun Royal Sovereign led the second, leeward, column. The two British columns approached from the west at nearly a right angle to the allied line. Nelson led his column into a feint toward the van of the Franco-Spanish fleet and then abruptly turned toward the actual point of attack. Collingwood altered the course of his column slightly so that the two lines converged at this line of attack.

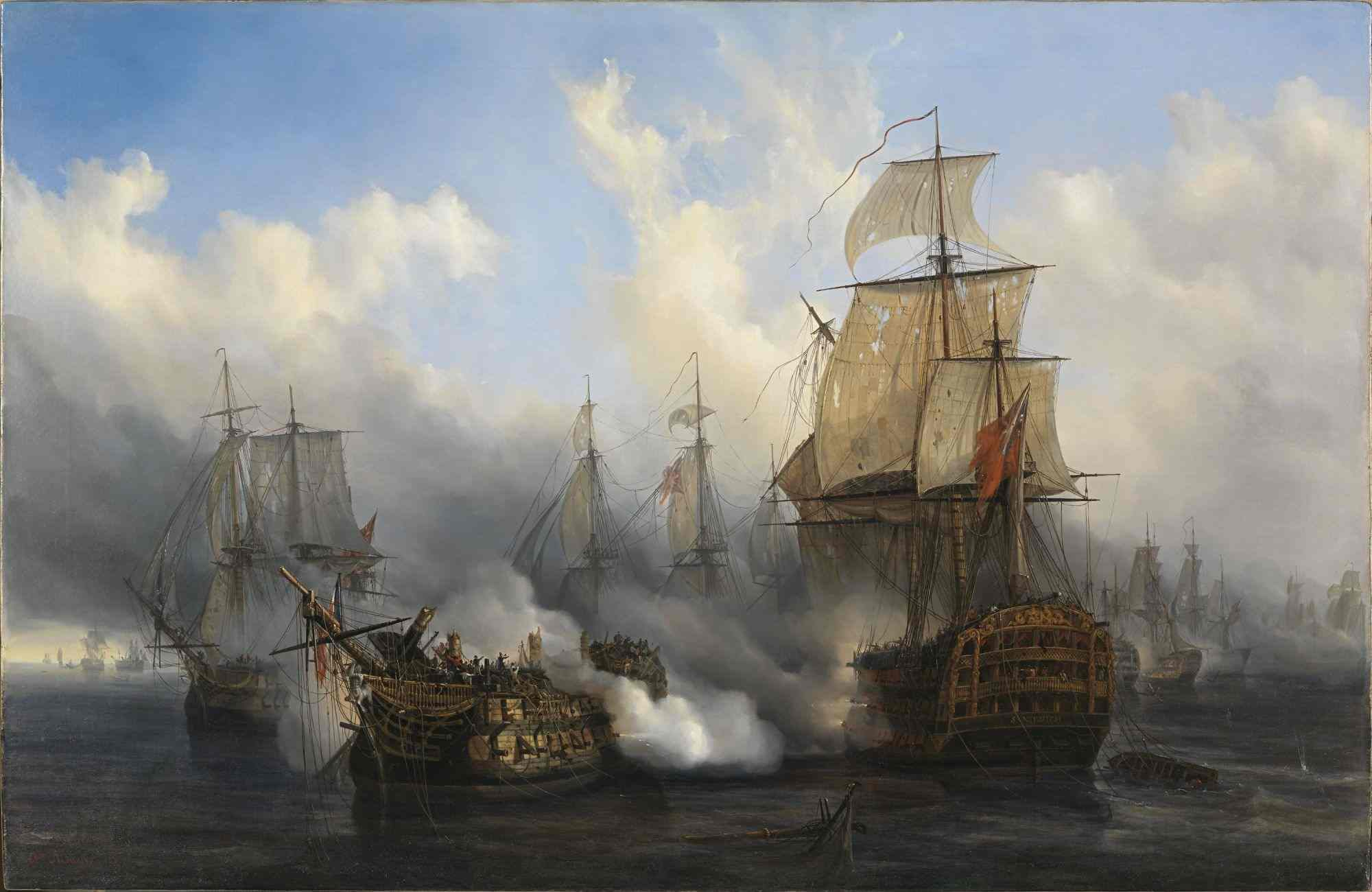
Artist's conception of HMS Sandwich fighting the French flagship Bucentaure (completely dismasted) at Trafalgar. Bucentaure is also fighting HMS Temeraire (on the left) and being fired into by HMS Victory (behind her). In fact, this is a mistake by Auguste Mayer, the painter; HMS Sandwich never fought at Trafalgar.

=== Main engagement ===
Just before his column engaged the allied forces, Collingwood said to his officers, "Now, gentlemen, let us do something today which the world may talk of hereafter." Because the winds were very light during the battle, all the ships were moving extremely slowly, and the foremost British ships were under heavy fire from several of the allied ships for almost an hour before their own guns could bear.

At noon, Villeneuve sent the signal "engage the enemy", and Fougueux fired her first trial shot at Royal Sovereign. Royal Sovereign had all sails out and, having recently had her bottom cleaned, outran the rest of the British fleet. As she approached the allied line, she came under fire from Fougueux, Indomptable, San Justo, and San Leandro, before breaking the line just astern of Admiral Alava's flagship Spanish ship Santa Ana, into which she fired a devastating double-shotted raking broadside. On board Victory, Nelson pointed to Royal Sovereign and said, "See how that noble fellow Collingwood carries his ship into action!" At approximately the same moment, Collingwood remarked to his captain, Edward Rotheram, "What would Nelson give to be here?"

Artist's conception of the situation at noon as Royal Sovereign was breaking into the Franco-Spanish line

The second ship in the British lee column, Belleisle, was engaged by Aigle, Achille, Neptune, and Fougueux; she was soon completely dismasted, unable to manoeuvre and largely unable to fight, as her sails blinded her batteries, but kept flying her flag for 45 minutes until the following British ships came to her rescue.

For 40 minutes, Victory was under fire from Héros, Santísima Trinidad, Redoutable, and Neptune; although many shots went astray, others killed and wounded a number of her crew and shot her wheel away, so that she had to be steered from her tiller belowdecks, all before she could respond. At 12:45, Victory cut the Franco-Spanish line between Villeneuve's flagship Bucentaure and Redoutable; she came close to Bucentaure with her guns loaded with double or treble shots each, and her 68-pounder carronades loaded with 500 musketballs, she unleashed a devastating treble-shotted raking broadside through Bucentaure's stern which killed and wounded some 200–400 men of the ship's 800-man complement and dismasted the ship. This volley of gunfire from the Victory immediately knocked the French flagship out of action. Villeneuve thought that boarding would take place, and with the Eagle of his ship in hand, told his men, "I will throw it onto the enemy ship and we will take it back there!" However, Victory engaged the 74-gun Redoutable; Bucentaure was left to the next three ships of the British windward column: Temeraire, Conqueror, and Neptune.

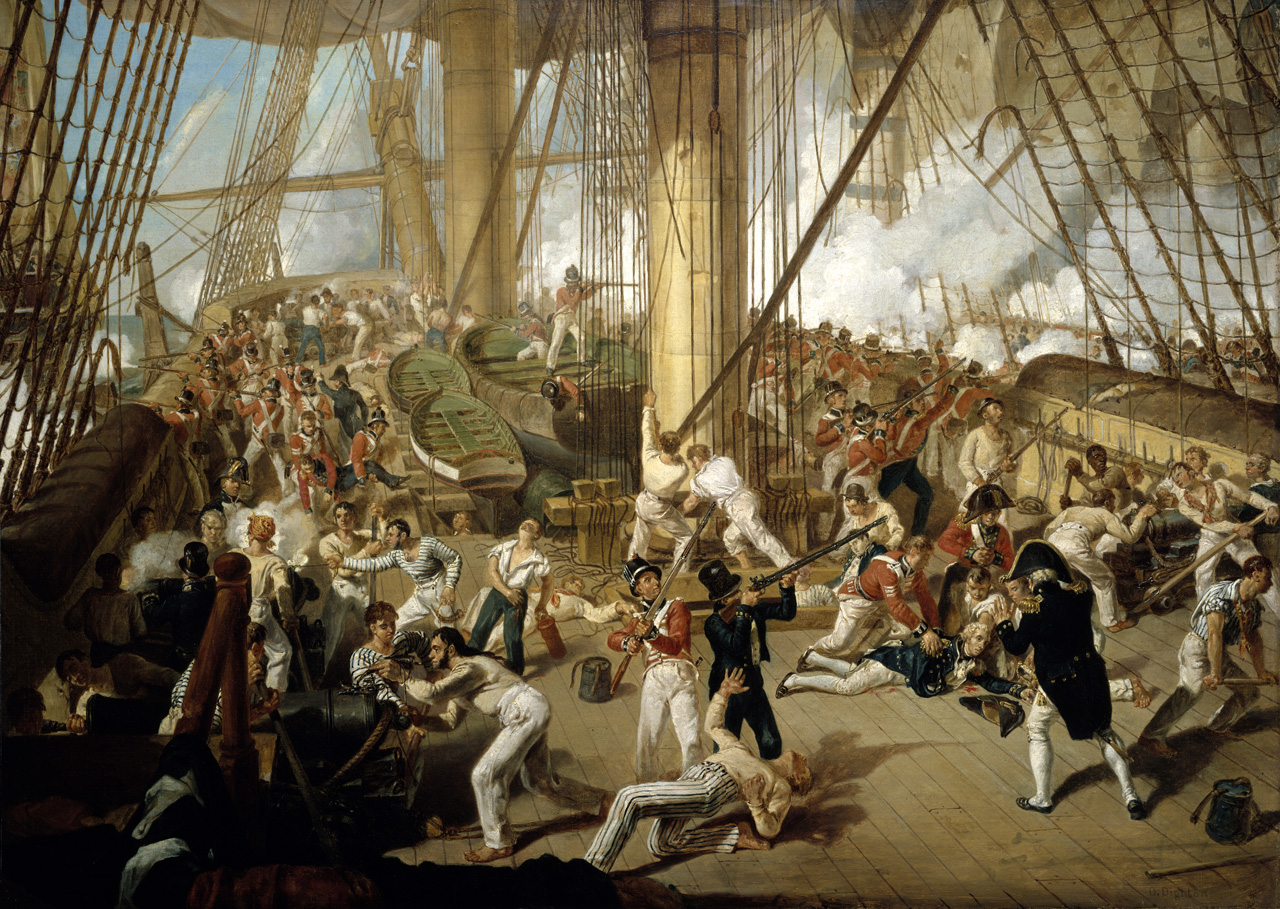
Painter Denis Dighton's imagining of Nelson being shot on the quarterdeck of Victory

A general mêlée ensued. Victory locked masts with the French Redoutable, whose crew, including a strong infantry corps (with three captains and four lieutenants), gathered for an attempt to board and seize Victory. A musket bullet fired from the mizzentop of Redoutable struck Nelson in the left shoulder, passed through his spine at the sixth and seventh thoracic vertebrae, and lodged two inches below his right scapula in the muscles of his back. Nelson exclaimed, "They finally succeeded, I am dead." He was carried below decks.

Painter Nicholas Pocock's conception of the situation at 1300h

Victory's gunners were called on deck to fight boarders, and she ceased firing. The gunners were forced back below decks by French grenades. As the French were preparing to board Victory, Temeraire, the second ship in the British windward column, approached from the starboard bow of Redoutable and fired on the exposed French crew with a carronade, causing many casualties.

At 13:55, the French Captain Lucas of Redoutable, with 99 fit men out of 643 and severely wounded himself, surrendered. The French Bucentaure was isolated by Victory and Temeraire, and then engaged by Neptune, Leviathan, and Conqueror; similarly, Santísima Trinidad was isolated and overwhelmed, surrendering after three hours.

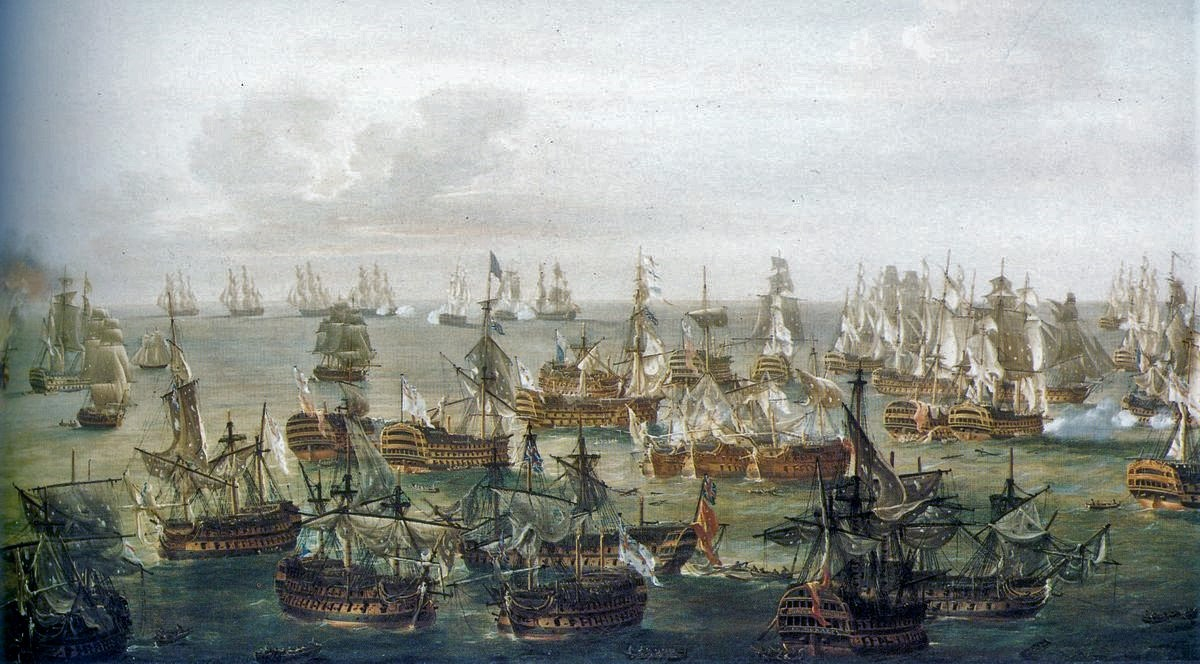
Painter Nicholas Pocock's conception of the situation at 1700h

=== Allied collapse ===
As more and more British ships entered the battle, the ships of the allied centre and rear were gradually overwhelmed. The allied van, after long remaining quiescent, made a futile demonstration and then sailed away. During the combat, Gravina was wounded, while Dionisio Alcalá-Galiano and Cosme Damián Churruca – commanders of the Bahama and San Juan Nepomuceno, respectively – were killed after ordering their ships not to surrender. Gravina died from his wounds months later. The British took 20 vessels of the Franco-Spanish fleet and lost none. Among the captured French ships were Aigle, Algésiras, Berwick, Bucentaure, Fougueux, Intrépide, Redoutable, and Swiftsure. The Spanish ships taken were Argonauta, Bahama, Monarca, Neptuno, San Agustín, San Ildefonso, San Juan Nepomuceno, Santísima Trinidad, and Santa Ana. Of these, Redoutable sank, and Santísima Trinidad and Argonauta were scuttled by the British. Achille exploded, Intrépide and San Augustín burned, and Aigle, Berwick, Fougueux, and Monarca were wrecked in a gale following the battle.

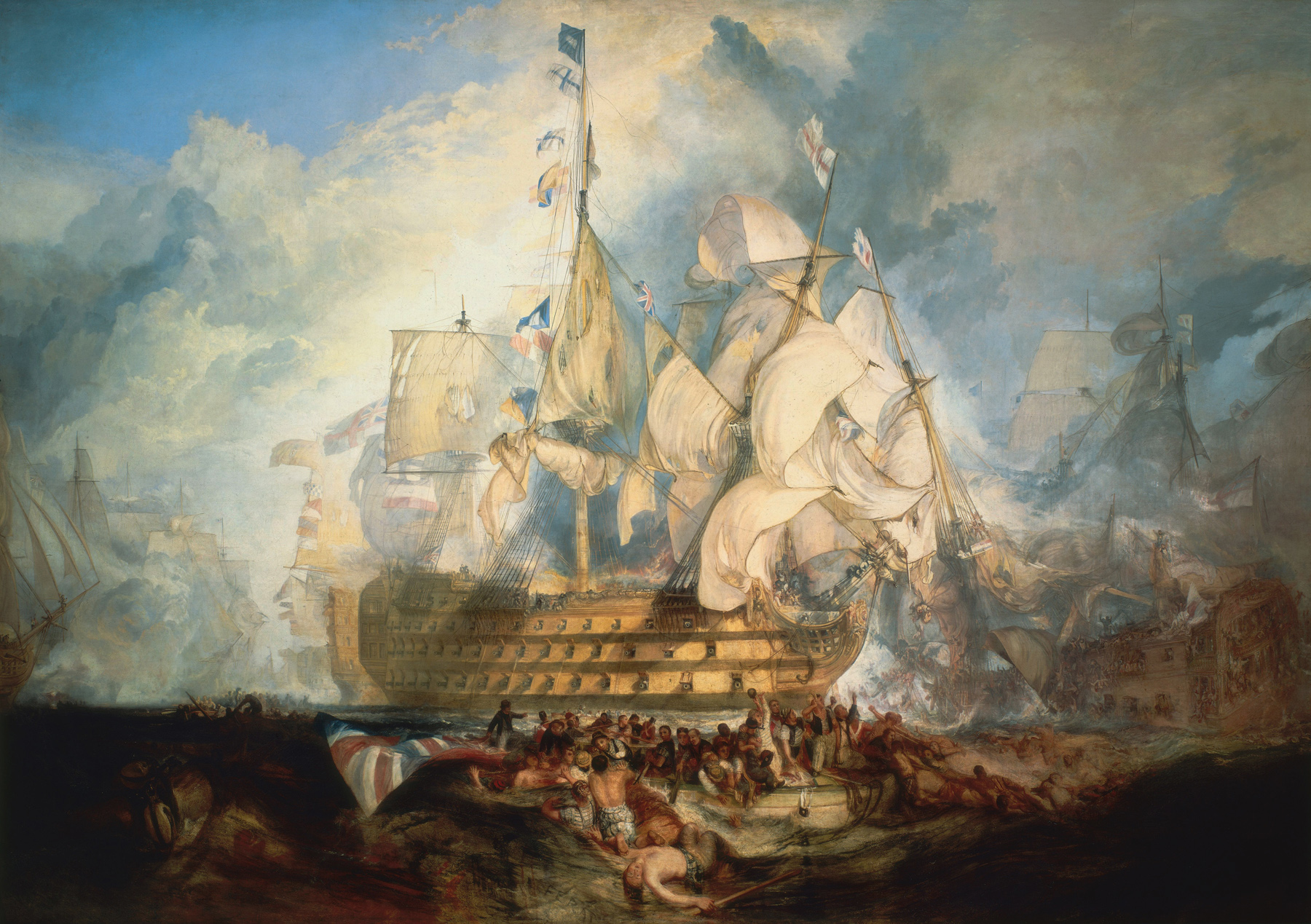
J.M.W. Turner, The Battle of Trafalgar (1822), National Maritime Museum, Greenwich.

As Nelson lay dying, he ordered the fleet to anchor, as a storm was predicted. However, when the storm blew up, many of the severely damaged ships sank or ran aground on the shoals. A few of them were recaptured, some by the French and Spanish prisoners overcoming the small prize crews, others by ships sallying from Cádiz. Surgeon William Beatty heard Nelson murmur, "Thank God I have done my duty"; when he returned, Nelson's voice had faded, and his pulse was very weak. He looked up as Beatty took his pulse, then closed his eyes. Nelson's chaplain, Alexander Scott, who remained by Nelson as he died, recorded his last words as "God and my country." It has been suggested by Nelson historian Craig Cabell that Nelson was actually reciting his own prayer as he fell into his death coma, as the words 'God' and 'my country' are closely linked therein. Nelson died at half-past four, three hours after being hit.

=== Allied retreat ===
Towards the end of the battle, and with the combined fleet being overwhelmed, the still relatively un-engaged portion of the van under Rear-Admiral Dumanoir Le Pelley tried to come to the assistance of the collapsing centre. After failing to fight his way through, he decided to break off the engagement, and led four French ships, his flagship the 80-gun Formidable, the 74-gun ships Scipion, Duguay-Trouin and Mont Blanc away from the fighting. He headed at first for the Straits of Gibraltar, intending to carry out Villeneuve's original orders and make for Toulon. On 22 October he changed his mind, remembering a powerful British squadron under Rear-Admiral Thomas Louis was patrolling the straits, and headed north, hoping to reach one of the French Atlantic ports. With a storm gathering in strength off the Spanish coast, he sailed westwards to clear Cape St. Vincent, prior to heading north-west, swinging eastwards across the Bay of Biscay, and aiming to reach the French port at Rochefort. These four ships remained at large until their encounter with and attempt to chase a British frigate brought them in range of a British squadron under Sir Richard Strachan, which captured them all on 4 November 1805 at the Battle of Cape Ortegal.

=== Allied sortie ===
The gale after Trafalgar, depicted by Thomas Buttersworth

Only eleven allied ships escaped to Cádiz, and, of those, only five were considered seaworthy. The seriously wounded Admiral Gravina passed command of the remainder of the fleet over to Commodore Julien Cosmao on 23 October. From shore, the allied commanders could see an opportunity for a rescue mission. Cosmao claimed in his report that the rescue plan was entirely his idea, but Vice-Admiral Escaño recorded a meeting of Spanish and French commodores at which a planned rescue was discussed and agreed upon. Enrique MacDonnell and Cosmao were of equal rank and both raised commodore's pennants before hoisting anchor. Both sets of mariners were determined to make an attempt to recapture some of the prizes. Cosmao ordered the rigging of his ship, the 74-gun Pluton, to be repaired and reinforced her crew (which had been depleted by casualties from the battle), with sailors from the French frigate Hermione. Taking advantage of a favourable northwesterly wind, Pluton, the 80-gun Neptune and Indomptable, the Spanish 100-gun Rayo and 74-gun San Francisco de Asis, together with five French frigates and two brigs, sailed out of the harbour towards the British.

=== British cast off the prizes ===
Soon after leaving port, the wind shifted to west-southwest, raising a heavy sea with the result that most of the British prizes broke their tow ropes, and drifting far to leeward, were only partially resecured. The combined squadron came in sight at noon, causing Collingwood to summon his most battle-ready ships to meet the threat. In doing so, he ordered them to cast off towing their prizes. He had formed a defensive line of ten ships by three o'clock in the afternoon and approached the Franco-Spanish squadron, covering the remainder of their prizes which stood out to sea. The Franco-Spanish squadron, numerically inferior, chose not to approach within gunshot and then declined to attack. Collingwood also chose not to seek action, and in the confusion of the powerful storm, the French frigates managed to retake two Spanish ships of the line which had been cast off by their British captors, the 112-gun Santa Ana and 80-gun Neptuno, taking them in tow and making for Cádiz. On being taken in tow, the Spanish crews rose up against their British prize crews, putting them to work as prisoners.

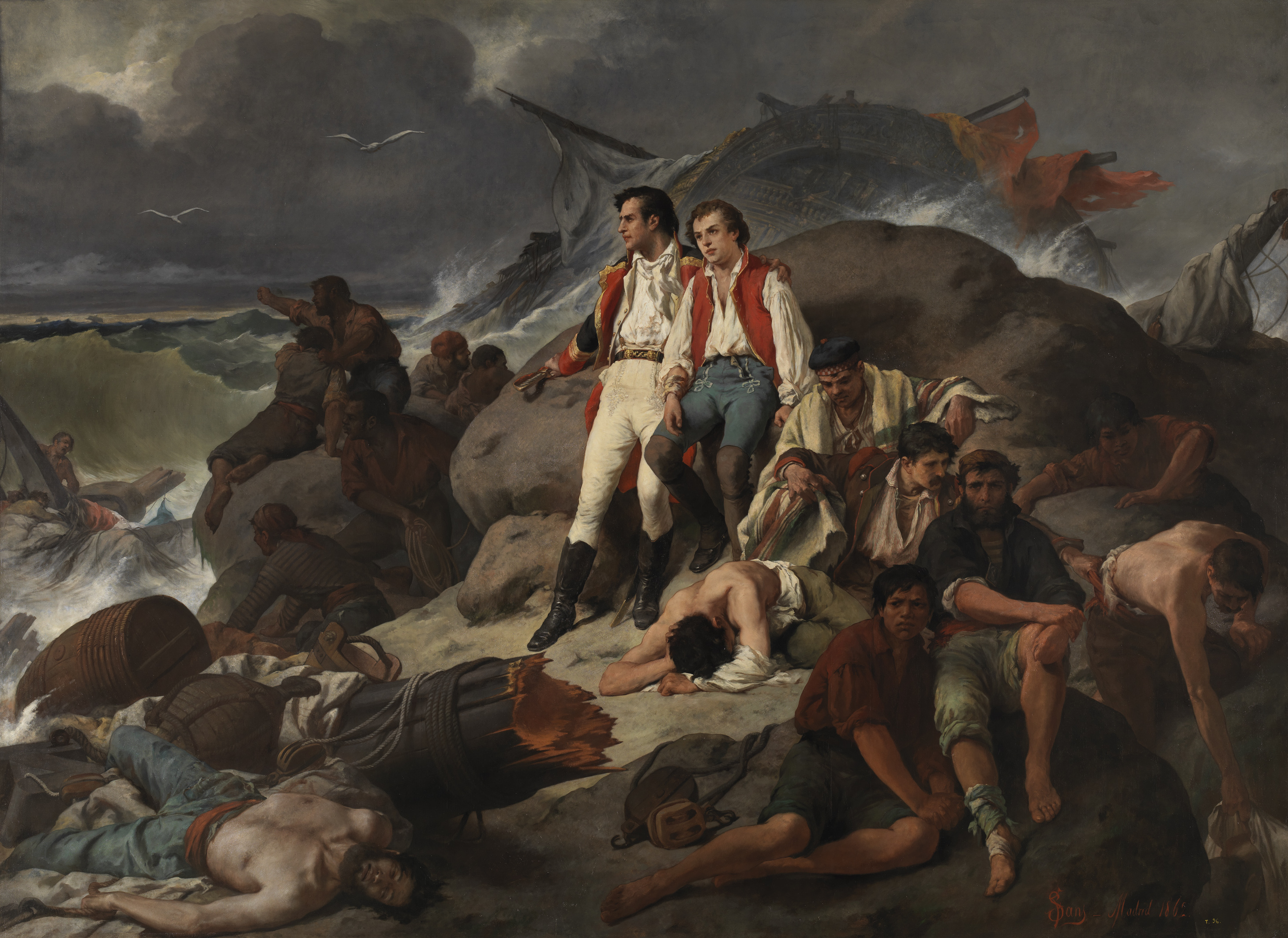
1862 painting of a wrecked Neptuno with her surviving crew on the rocks

=== Failure of the allied sortie ===
Despite this initial success, the Franco-Spanish force, hampered by battle damage, struggled in the heavy seas. Neptuno was eventually wrecked off Rota in the gale, while Santa Ana reached port. The French 80-gun ship Indomptable was wrecked on the 24th or 25th off the town of Rota on the northwest point of the bay of Cádiz. At the time Indomptable had 1,200 men on board, but no more than 100 were saved. San Francisco de Asís was driven ashore in Cádiz Bay, near Fort Santa Catalina, although her crew was saved. Rayo, an old three-deck vessel with more than 50 years of service, anchored off Sanlúcar, a few leagues to the northwest of Rota. There, she lost her masts, already damaged in the battle. Heartened by the approach of the squadron, the French crew of the former flagship Bucentaure also rose up and retook the ship from the British prize crew but she was wrecked later on 23 October. Aigle escaped from the British ship HMS Defiance, but was wrecked off the Port of Santa María on 23 October; while the French prisoners on Berwick cut the tow cables, but caused her to founder off Sanlúcar on 22 October. The crew of Algésiras rose up and managed to sail into Cádiz.

Observing that some of the leewardmost of the prizes were escaping towards the Spanish coast, Leviathan asked for and was granted permission by Collingwood to try to retrieve the prizes and bring them to anchor. Leviathan chased Monarca, but on 24 October she came across Rayo, dismasted but still flying Spanish colours, at anchor off the shoals of Sanlúcar. At this point the 74-gun HMS Donegal, en route from Gibraltar under Captain Pulteney Malcolm, was seen approaching from the south on the larboard tack with a moderate breeze from northwest-by-north and steered directly for the Spanish three-decker. At about ten o'clock, just as Monarca had got within little more than a mile of Rayo, Leviathan fired a warning shot wide of Monarca, to oblige her to drop anchor. The shot fell between Monarca and Rayo. The latter, conceiving that it was probably intended for her, hauled down her colours, and was taken by HMS Donegal, who anchored alongside and took off the prisoners. Leviathan resumed her pursuit of Monarca, eventually catching up and forcing her to surrender. On boarding her, her British captors found that she was in a sinking state, and so removed the British prize crew, and nearly all of her original Spanish crew members. The nearly empty Monarca parted her cable and was wrecked during the night. Despite the efforts of her British prize crew, Rayo was driven onshore on 26 October and wrecked, with the loss of 25 men. The remainder of the prize crew were made prisoners by the Spanish.

In the aftermath of the storm, Collingwood wrote to the British Admiralty in November 1805:

The condition of our own ships was such that it was very doubtful what would be their fate. Many a time I would have given the whole group of our capture, to ensure our own... I can only say that in my life I never saw such efforts as were made to save these [prize] ships, and would rather fight another battle than pass through such a week as followed it...

On balance, the allied counter-attack achieved little. In forcing the British to suspend their repairs to defend themselves, it influenced Collingwood's decision to sink or set fire to the most damaged of his remaining prizes. Cosmao retook two Spanish ships of the line, but it cost him one French and two Spanish vessels to do so. Fearing their loss, the British burnt or sank Santísima Trinidad, Argonauta, San Antonio, and Intrépide. Only four of the British prizes, the French Swiftsure and the Spanish Bahama, San Ildefonso and San Juan Nepomuceno survived to be taken to Britain. After the end of the battle and storm only nine ships of the line were left in Cádiz.

== Aftermath ==
Spanish military garrisons and civilians set out to rescue survivors from the numerous shipwrecks scattered along the Andalusian coast. British prize crews were captured and given good treatment. On 27 October, Collingwood offered the governor of Cádiz to put his Spanish wounded prisoners ashore and set them free. The governor and Gravina offered in exchange to release their British prisoners, who boarded the British fleet. The French later joined this humanitarian agreement.

=== Casualties ===
Casualties % by ship. (Note: (referenced in § Franco-Spanish fleet and § British fleet)) The number is the order in the line. HMS Africa • British weather column, led by Nelson • British lee column, led by Collingwood • French • Spanish

The disparity in losses has been attributed by some historians less to Nelson's daring tactics than to the difference in fighting readiness of the two fleets. Nelson's fleet was made up of ships of the line which had spent a considerable amount of sea time during the months of blockades of French ports, whilst the French fleet had generally been at anchor in port. However, Villeneuve's fleet had just spent months at sea crossing the Atlantic twice, which supports the proposition that the main difference between the two fleets' combat effectiveness was the morale of the leaders. The daring tactics employed by Nelson were to ensure a strategically decisive result. The results vindicated his naval judgement.

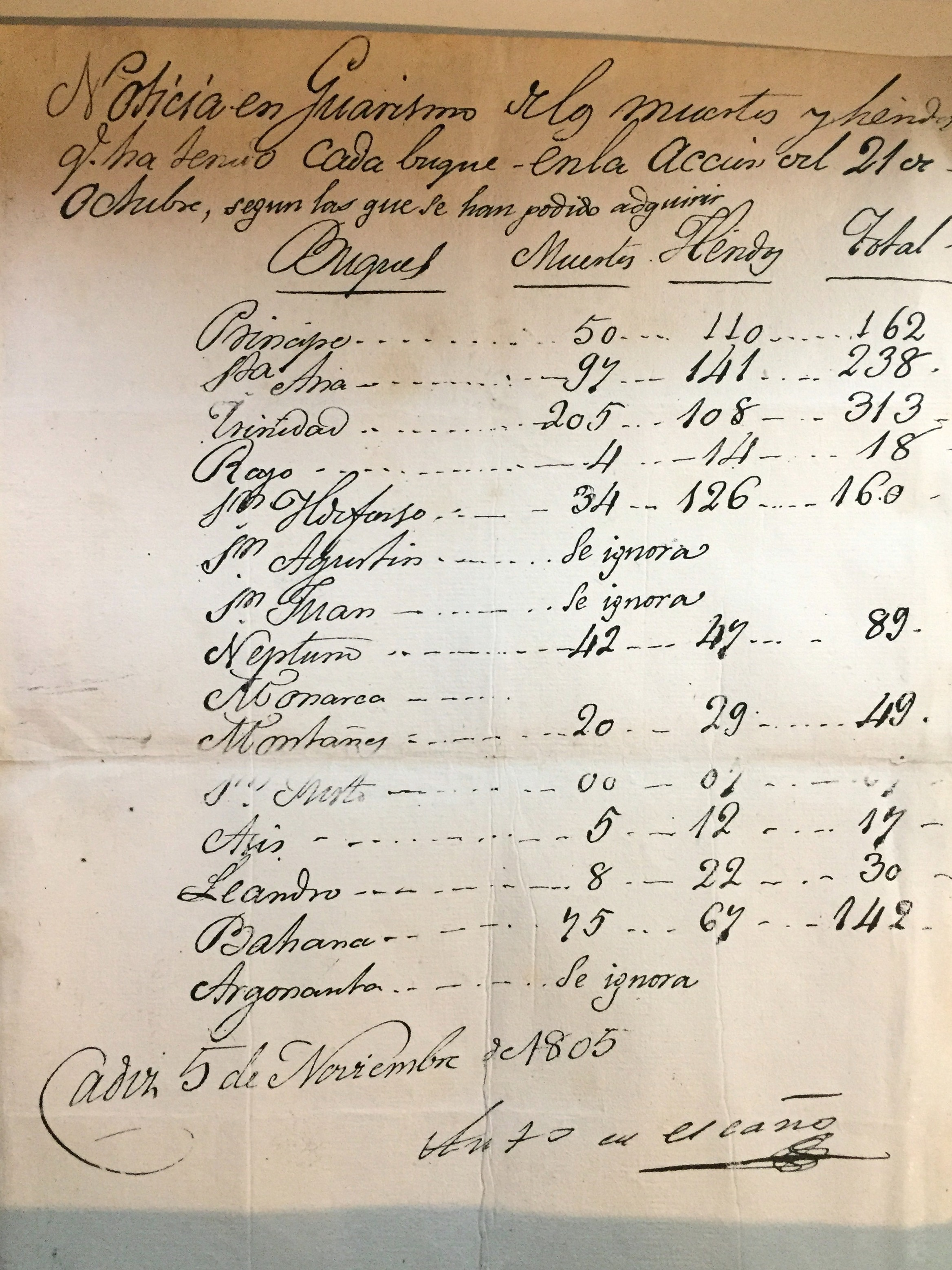
Report of Spanish losses in the combat of 21 October

When Rosily arrived in Cádiz, he found only five French ships, rather than the 18 he was expecting. The surviving ships remained bottled up in Cádiz until 1808 when Napoleon invaded Spain. The French ships were then seized by the Spanish forces and put into service against France. HMS Victory made her way to Gibraltar for repairs, carrying Nelson's body. She put into Rosia Bay, Gibraltar and after emergency repairs were carried out, returned to Britain. Many of the injured crew were taken ashore at Gibraltar and treated in the Naval Hospital. Men who subsequently died from injuries sustained at the battle are buried in or near the Trafalgar Cemetery, at the south end of Main Street, Gibraltar. One Royal Marine officer, Captain Charles Adair, was killed on board Victory, and Royal Marine Lieutenant Lewis Buckle Reeve was seriously wounded and laid next to Nelson. (Note: Reeve's Naval General Service Medal with Trafalgar clasp and Muster List for HMS Victory are on show at the Royal Marines Museum, Southsea, Britain BBC staff (2008).)

The battle took place the day after the Battle of Ulm, and Napoleon did not hear about it for weeks—the Grande Armée had left Boulogne to fight Britain's allies before they could combine their armies. He had tight control over the Paris media and kept the defeat a closely guarded secret for over a month, at which point newspapers proclaimed it to have been a tremendous victory. In a counter-propaganda move, a fabricated text declaring the battle a "spectacular victory" for the French and Spanish was published in Herald and attributed to Le Moniteur Universel.

Vice-Admiral Villeneuve was taken prisoner aboard his flagship and taken back to Britain. After his parole in 1806, he returned to France, where he was found dead in his inn room during a stop on the way to Paris, with six stab wounds in the chest from a dining knife. It was officially recorded that he had committed suicide. Despite the British victory over the Franco-Spanish navies, Trafalgar had negligible impact on the remainder of the War of the Third Coalition. Less than two months later, Napoleon decisively defeated the Third Coalition at the Battle of Austerlitz, knocking Austria out of the war and forcing the dissolution of the Holy Roman Empire. Although Trafalgar meant France could no longer challenge Britain at sea, Napoleon proceeded to establish the Continental System in an attempt to deny Britain trade with the continent. The Napoleonic Wars continued for another ten years after Trafalgar. Nelson's body was preserved in a barrel of brandy for the trip home to a grand state funeral.

=== Consequences ===
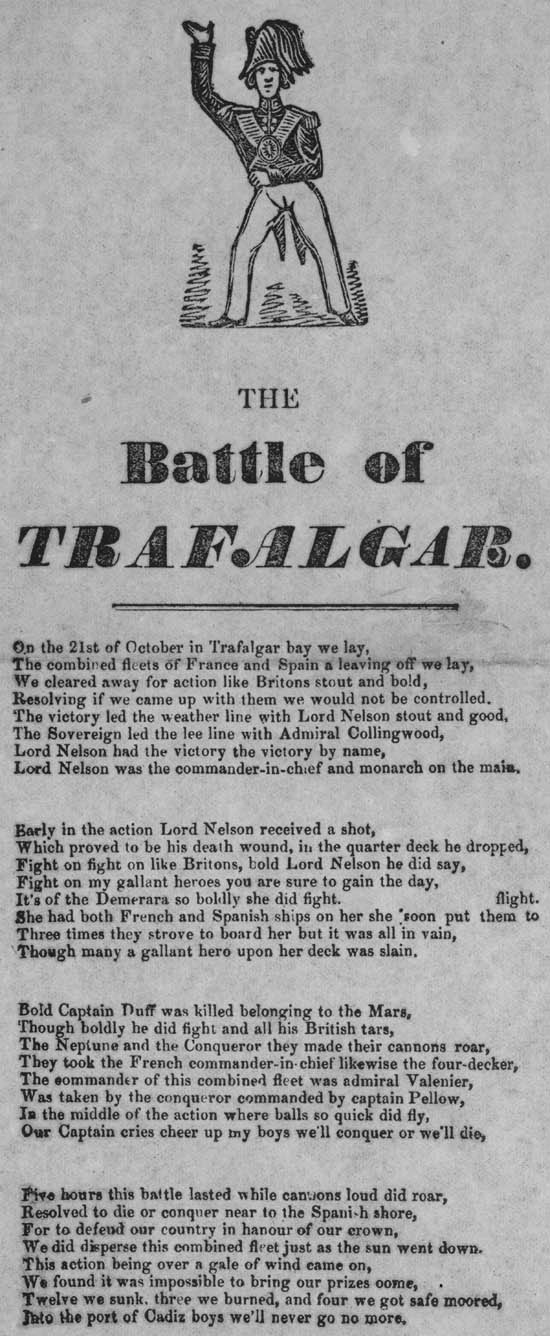
A broadside from the 1850s recounts the story

Following the battle, the Royal Navy was never again seriously challenged by the French fleet in a large-scale engagement. Napoleon had already abandoned his plans of invasion before the battle and they were never revived. The battle did not mean, however, that the French naval challenge to Britain was over. First, as the French control over the continent expanded, Britain had to take active steps with the Battle of Copenhagen in 1807 and elsewhere in 1808 to prevent the ships of smaller European navies from falling into French hands. This effort was largely successful, but did not end the French threat as Napoleon instituted a large-scale shipbuilding programme that had produced a fleet of 80 ships of the line at the time of his fall from power in 1814, with more under construction. However, despite constituting a substantial fleet in being, these had no impact on Britain's naval superiority throughout the conflict. For almost 10 years after Trafalgar, the Royal Navy maintained a close blockade of French bases and observed the growth of the French fleet. In the end, Napoleon's Empire was destroyed by land before his ambitious naval build-up could be completed.

The Royal Navy dominance of the sea would not be meaningfully tested until the Battle of Jutland in World War One. Although the victory at Trafalgar was typically given as the reason at the time, modern historical analyses suggest that relative economic strength was an important underlying cause of British naval mastery.

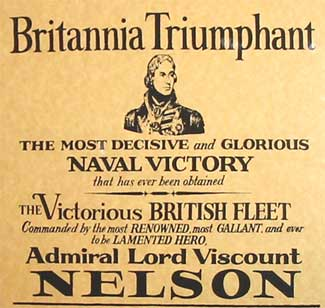
Detail from a modern reproduction of an 1805 poster commemorating the battle

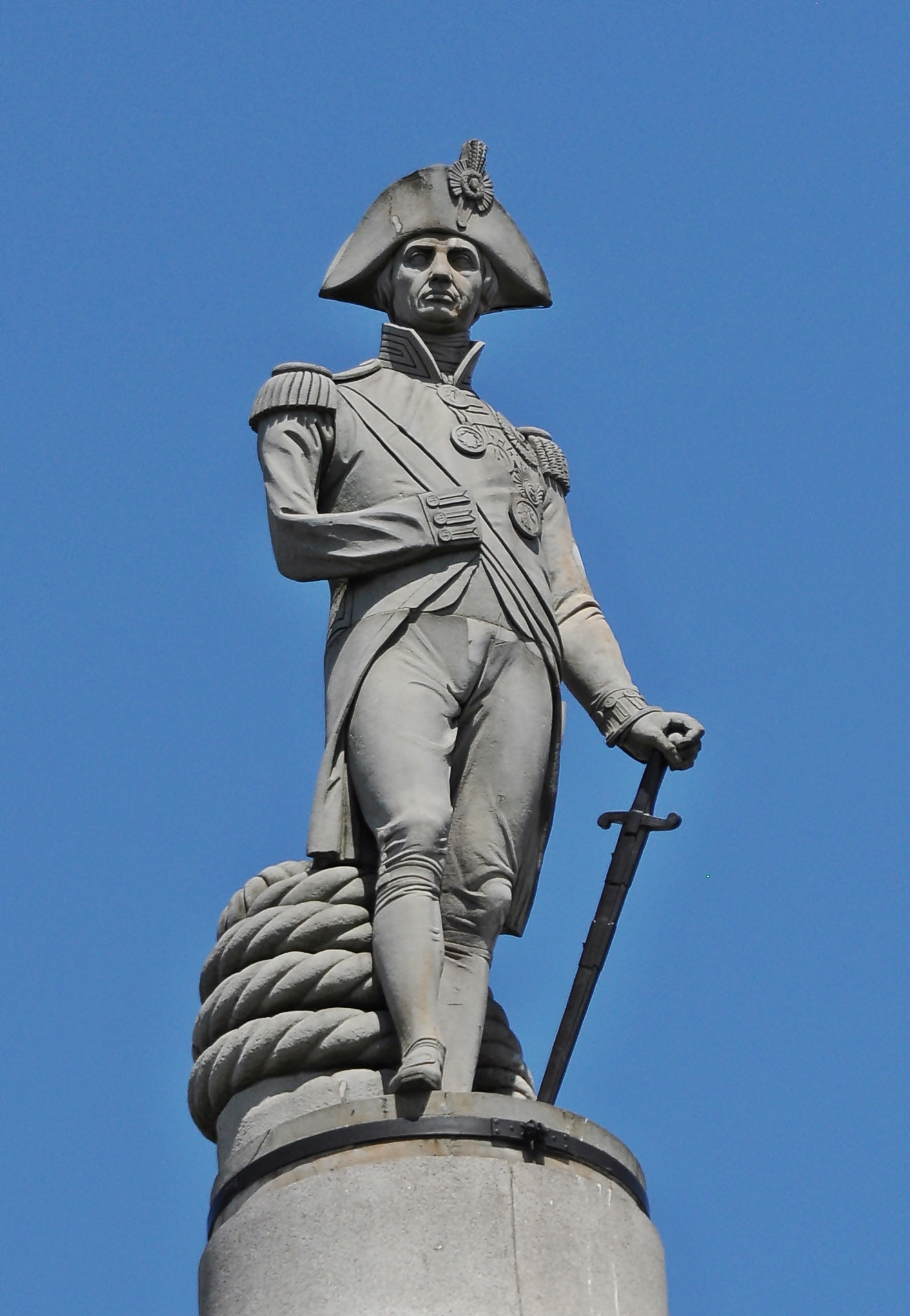
Nelson on top of Nelson's Column in Trafalgar Square in London

Nelson became – and remains – Britain's greatest naval war hero, and an inspiration to the Royal Navy, yet his unorthodox tactics were seldom emulated by later generations. The first monument to be erected in Britain to commemorate Nelson may be that raised on Glasgow Green in 1806, albeit possibly preceded by a monument at Taynuilt, near Oban in Scotland dated 1805, both also commemorating the many Scots crew and captains at the battle. (Note: Five of Nelson's 27 captains of the fleet were Scottish, as were almost 30% of the crew MercoPress staff (2005)) The 144-foot-tall (44 m) Nelson Monument on Glasgow Green was designed by David Hamilton and paid for by public subscription. Around the base are the names of his major victories: Aboukir (1798), Copenhagen (1801) and Trafalgar (1805). The Nelson Monument overlooking Portsmouth was built in 1807–08 with money subscribed by sailors and marines who served at Trafalgar. In 1808, Nelson's Pillar was erected by leading members of the Anglo-Irish aristocracy in Dublin to commemorate Nelson and his achievements (between 10% and 20% of the sailors at Trafalgar had been from Ireland), and remained until it was destroyed in a bombing by "Old IRA" members in 1966. Nelson's Monument in Edinburgh was built between 1807 and 1815 in the form of an upturned telescope, and in 1853 a time ball was added which still drops at noon GMT to give a time signal to ships in Leith and the Firth of Forth. In summer this coincides with the one o'clock gun being fired. The Britannia Monument in Great Yarmouth was raised by 1819. Nelson's Column, Montreal began public subscriptions soon after news of the victory at Trafalgar arrived; the column was completed in the autumn of 1809 and still stands in Place Jacques Cartier. A statue of Lord Nelson stood in Bridgetown, Barbados, in what was also once known as Trafalgar Square, from 1813 to 2020.

London's Trafalgar Square was named in honour of Nelson's victory. At the centre of the square there is the 45.1 m (148 ft) Nelson's Column, with a 5.5 m (18 ft) statue of Nelson on top. It was finished in 1843.

== Legacy ==
=== 100th anniversary ===
In 1905, there were events up and down the country to commemorate the centenary, although none were attended by any member of the Royal Family, apparently to avoid upsetting the French, with whom the United Kingdom had recently entered the Entente Cordiale. King Edward VII did support the Nelson Centenary Memorial Fund of the British and Foreign Sailors Society, which sold Trafalgar centenary souvenirs marked with the royal cypher. A gala was held on 21 October at the Royal Albert Hall in aid of the fund, which included a specially commissioned film by Alfred John West entitled Our Navy. The event ended with God Save the King and La Marseillaise. The first performance of Sir Henry Wood's Fantasia on British Sea Songs occurred on the same day at a special Promenade Concert.

=== 200th anniversary ===
In 2005 a series of events around the UK, part of the Sea Britain theme, marked the bicentenary of the Battle of Trafalgar. The 200th anniversary of the battle was also commemorated on six occasions in Portsmouth during June and July, at St Paul's Cathedral (where Nelson is entombed), in Trafalgar Square in London in October (T Square 200), and across the UK.

On 28 June, Queen Elizabeth II was involved in the largest Fleet Review in modern times in the Solent, in which 167 ships from 35 nations took part. The Queen inspected the international fleet from the Antarctic patrol ship HMS Endurance. The fleet included six aircraft carriers (modern capital ships): Charles de Gaulle, Illustrious, Invincible, Ocean, Principe de Asturias and Saipan. In the evening a symbolic re-enactment of the battle was staged with fireworks and various small ships playing parts in the battle.

Lieutenant John Lapenotière's historic voyage in HMS Pickle bringing the news of the victory from the fleet to Falmouth and thence by post chaise to the Admiralty in London was commemorated by the inauguration of The Trafalgar Way and further highlighted by the New Trafalgar Dispatch celebrations from July to September in which an actor played the part of Lapenotière and re-enacted parts of the historic journey.

On the actual anniversary day, 21 October, naval manoeuvres were conducted in Trafalgar Bay near Cádiz involving a combined fleet from Britain, Spain, and France. Many descendants of people present at the battle, including members of Nelson's family, were at the ceremony.

== See also ==
- List of Royal Navy ships
- List of ships captured in the 19th century § Battle of Trafalgar
- Bibliography of 18th–19th century Royal Naval history
- Trafalgar Day

== Notes ==
| Preceded by Battle of Verona (1805) | Napoleonic Wars; Battle of Trafalgar | Succeeded by Battle of Caldiero (1805) |
