= French ship Neptune (1803) =

Bucentaure-class ship of the line of the French Navy

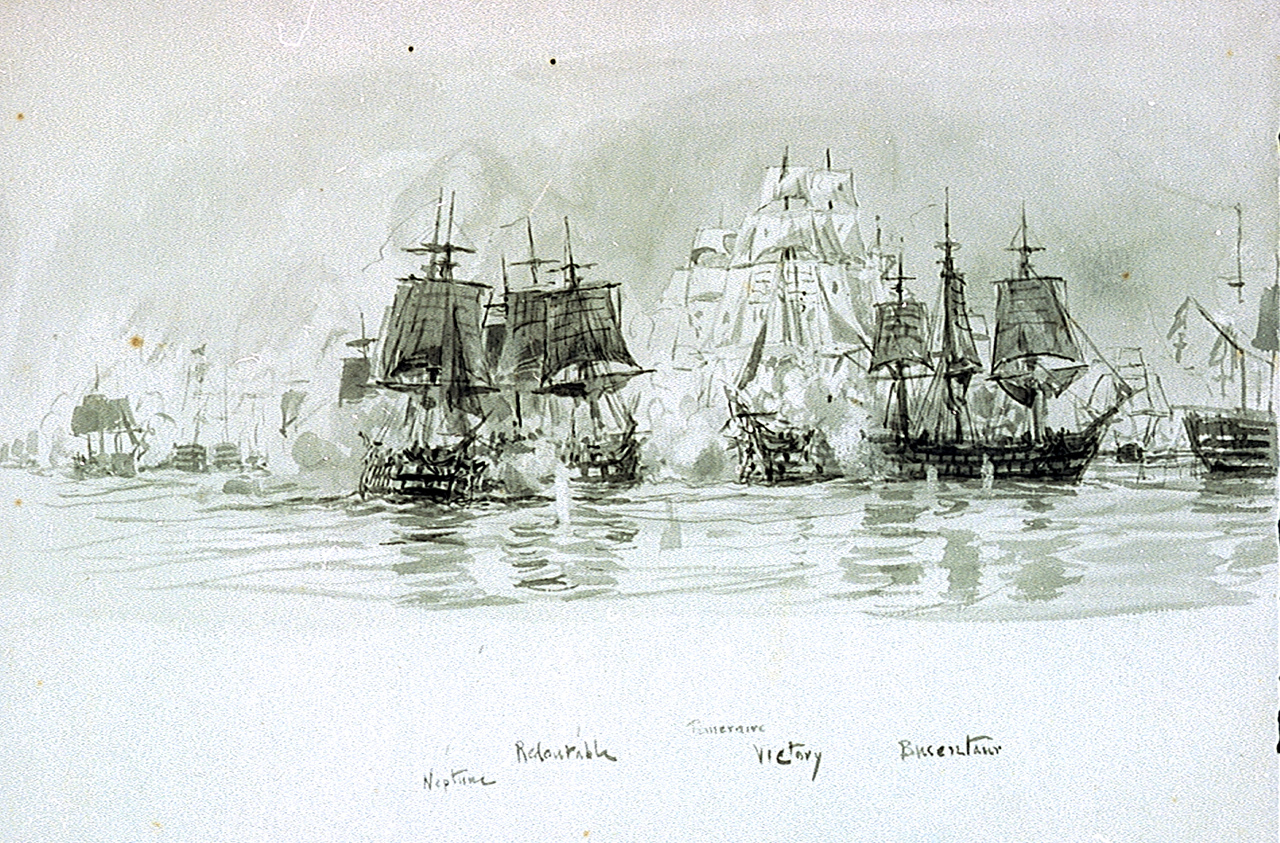
- Neptune (centre-left) at the Battle of Trafalgar

History

France
- Name: Neptune
- Namesake: Neptune
- Builder: Toulon
- Laid down: 1801
- Launched: 15 August 1803
- Honours and awards: Participated in: Battle of Cape Finisterre; Battle of Trafalgar
- Captured: by Spain on 14 July 1808

Spain
- Name: Neptuno
- Acquired: 14 July 1808
- Fate: Broken up in 1820

General characteristics
- Class & type: Bucentaure-class 80-gun ship of the line
- Displacement: 3,868 tonneaux
- Tons burthen: 2,034 port tonneaux
- Length: 195 ft 2 in (59.49 m) (gun deck)
- Beam: 51 ft 4.5 in (15.659 m)
- Draught: 26 ft (7.9 m)
- Depth of hold: 23 ft 2 in (7.06 m)
- Propulsion: Sails
- Complement: 690
- Armament: 80 guns; 30 × 36-pounders; 32 × 24-pounders; 18 × 12-pounders (12 aft, 6 forecastle); 6 × 36-pounder howitzers

Neptune was an 80-gun Bucentaure-class ship of the line of the French Navy. Built during the last years of the French Revolutionary Wars she was launched at the beginning of the Napoleonic Wars. Her brief career with the French included several major battles, though she spent the last 12 years of her life under the Spanish flag.

Neptune was built at Toulon and launched in 1803. She was commissioned in time to join an abortive attempt to break the British blockade of the port in October 1804, but the fleet was forced back to port by bad weather. She sailed again with the fleet, under Vice-Admiral Pierre-Charles Villeneuve, in early 1805, and this time succeeded in breaking out of the Mediterranean, and sailing to the West Indies, where the fleet was joined by Spanish ships. After achieving little in the Caribbean, the fleet sailed back to Europe, where they were engaged by a British fleet in the Battle of Cape Finisterre. Neptune saw little action, and was relatively unscathed. She took part in the final fleet manoeuvres, and ended up blockaded in Cádiz by a British fleet under Lord Nelson.

Villeneuve came out of Cádiz in late 1805, and was engaged by Nelson in the decisive Battle of Trafalgar on 21 October. During the battle Neptune fired on Nelson's flagship, HMS Victory, and duelled with several British ships including HMS Royal Sovereign, HMS Temeraire and HMS Belleisle. As the British began to overwhelm the combined fleet, the relatively undamaged Neptune joined several ships in a retreat to Cádiz. She sortied again two days later in an attempt to recover some of the prizes, but the fleet lost more ships than they regained, and Neptune had to be towed back to harbour.

The ship remained in Cádiz under a close British blockade until the Peninsular War between Spain and France broke out in 1808. Along with the rest of the French warships trapped in Cádiz, she was captured by the Spanish, who renamed her as Neptuno, replacing a Spanish ship lost at Trafalgar. Neptuno served with the Spanish for a further 12 years, being broken up in 1820.

== Construction and commissioning ==
Neptune was built at Toulon to a design by Jacques-Noël Sané, with her keel laid down in 1801. One of Sané's 80-gun Bucentaure class, her lines were virtually identical to those of her contemporaries Bucentaure, Indomptable and Formidable, all of which fought at Trafalgar. She was also similar to another Trafalgar combatant, the 80-gun HMS Tonnant, which had previously been a French warship. She was still under construction on the resumption of the war in 1803 after the Peace of Amiens, but was launched later that year. She was fitted out with masts, yards and rigging, and in late 1804 she was commissioned under Commodore Esprit-Tranquille Maistral.

== Trafalgar campaign ==
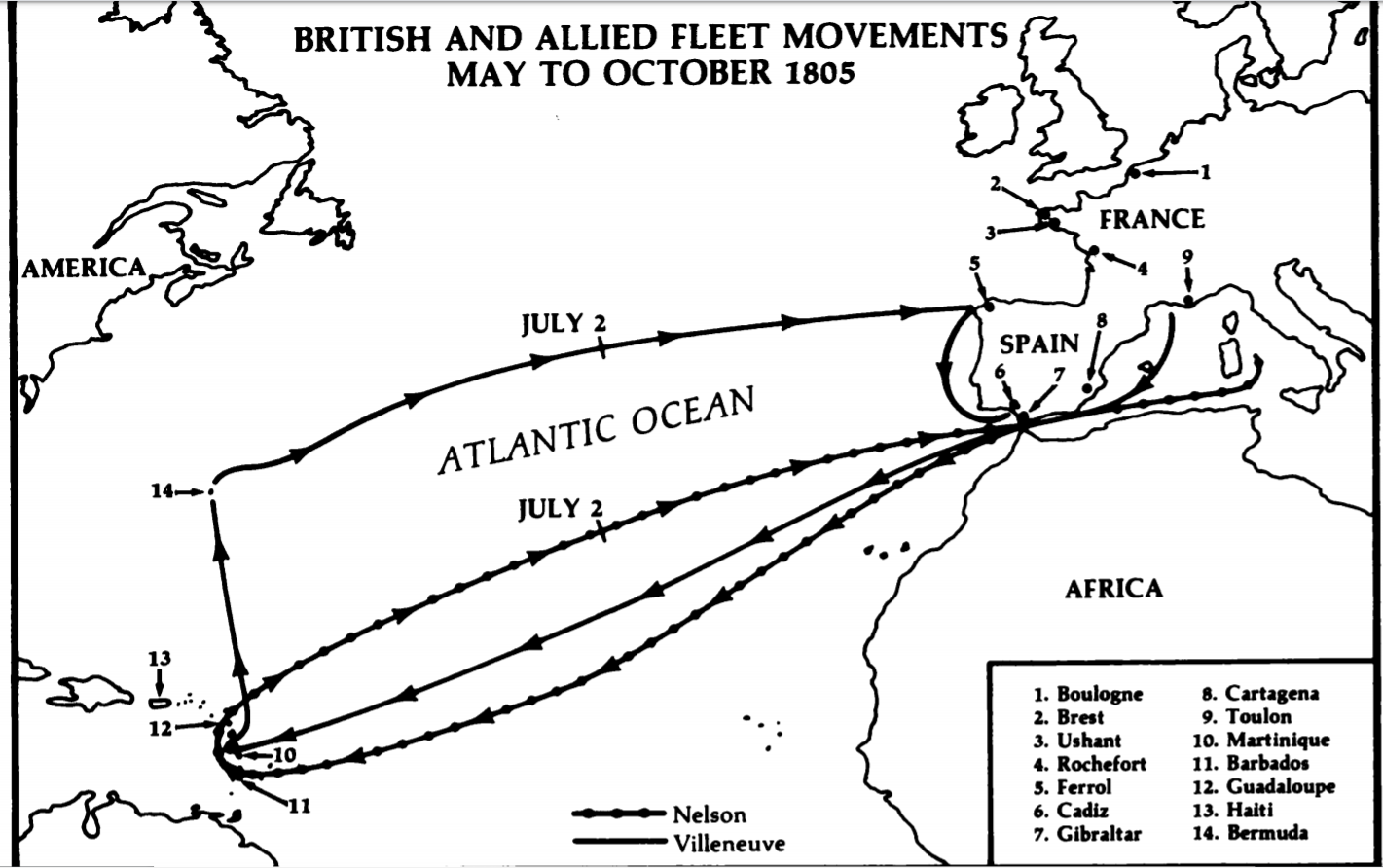
A map of the fleet movements during the campaign

Neptune joined the rest of the Toulon fleet preparing to sail for the West Indies on 21 October 1804 under the command of Vice-Admiral Pierre-Charles Villeneuve. The fleet was to transport 6,500 troops to attack British possessions in the Caribbean, but was unable to leave Toulon owing to the presence of a British fleet under Vice-Admiral Horatio Nelson, that was blockading the port. It was not until early January that Villeneuve judged the situation favourable enough to make a sortie. Neptune sailed with the 20-strong fleet on 17 January, but were sighted by the patrolling frigates of Nelson's inshore squadron. Villeneuve struggled on, but bad weather in the Gulf of Lyons dispersed his fleet, and fearing an attack on his disorganised forces, returned to Toulon three days after setting out. Villeneuve had in fact managed to give Nelson the slip. The two patrolling frigates, HMS Seahorse and HMS Active, had rushed to report the news to Nelson, anchored at La Maddalena, and in so doing, left the French unobserved. Nelson had rushed his fleet to sea, anticipating that Villeneuve would heading east. Nelson spent nearly six weeks sailing back and forth across the Mediterranean through heavy seas while the French remained in port, before news finally reached him of Villeneuve's location.

It was not until March that the French made another attempt to break out of Toulon, putting to sea on 29 March. Neptune formed part of Villeneuve's division, consisting of the flagship, the 80-gun Bucentaure, and the 74-gun ships Pluton, Mont Blanc, Berwick and Atlas. The other division was commanded by Counter-admiral Pierre Dumanoir le Pelley, flying his flag aboard the 80-gun Formidable, and accompanied by the 80-gun Indomptable, and the 74-gun ships Swiftsure, Scipion and Intrépide. Accompanying the fleet were six frigates and two brigs.^{[a]} The French fleet reached Cartagena on 6 April, having evaded Nelson through sheer chance, and pressed on from there, sailing through the Strait of Gibraltar on 8 April. After resupplying briefly at Cádiz, the fleet sailed to the West Indies, arriving at Fort de France, Martinique on 14 May, where they were joined over the next two days by six Spanish ships of the line and a frigate under Frederico Gravina.

The fleets resupplied and settled in to await the arrival of a large French fleet from Brest under Vice-Admiral Honoré Joseph Antoine Ganteaume. Unbeknownst to Villeneuve, Ganteaume was still being blockaded in Brest. The combined fleet achieved little while in the West Indies, managing only to capture the British-held Diamond Rock after two weeks of sitting idle at anchor. The small garrison surrendered on 2 June, by which time the frigate Didon had arrived with orders. Villeneuve was instructed to attack and capture the British colonies in the West Indies, before sailing his entire force back to Europe, join Ganteaume at Brest and cover the invasion flotilla. Villeneuve gathered his forces and pressed northwards towards Antigua, but on 7 June he came across a lightly defended convoy of British merchants, and captured several of them the following day. From them he discovered that Nelson was in hot pursuit, and had arrived at Barbados. Villeneuve decided to break off operations and return to Europe. The fleet got underway on 11 June.

== Finisterre and Cádiz ==
Villeneuve managed to evade Nelson on the return voyage, though his fleet was tracked by the brig HMS Curieux, carrying Nelson's despatches. The Admiralty was notified and a reinforced fleet under Vice-Admiral Robert Calder was sent to intercept the Franco-Spanish fleet as it arrived in European waters. The combined fleet was spotted on 22 July as it sailed westwards towards Ferrol, and Calder manoeuvred to intercept it. Villeneuve formed up the line of battle, with Neptune being eleventh from the front, positioned astern of the Berwick and ahead of the Bucentaure. Neptune saw little action in the confused fighting, and consequently escaped with little damage.

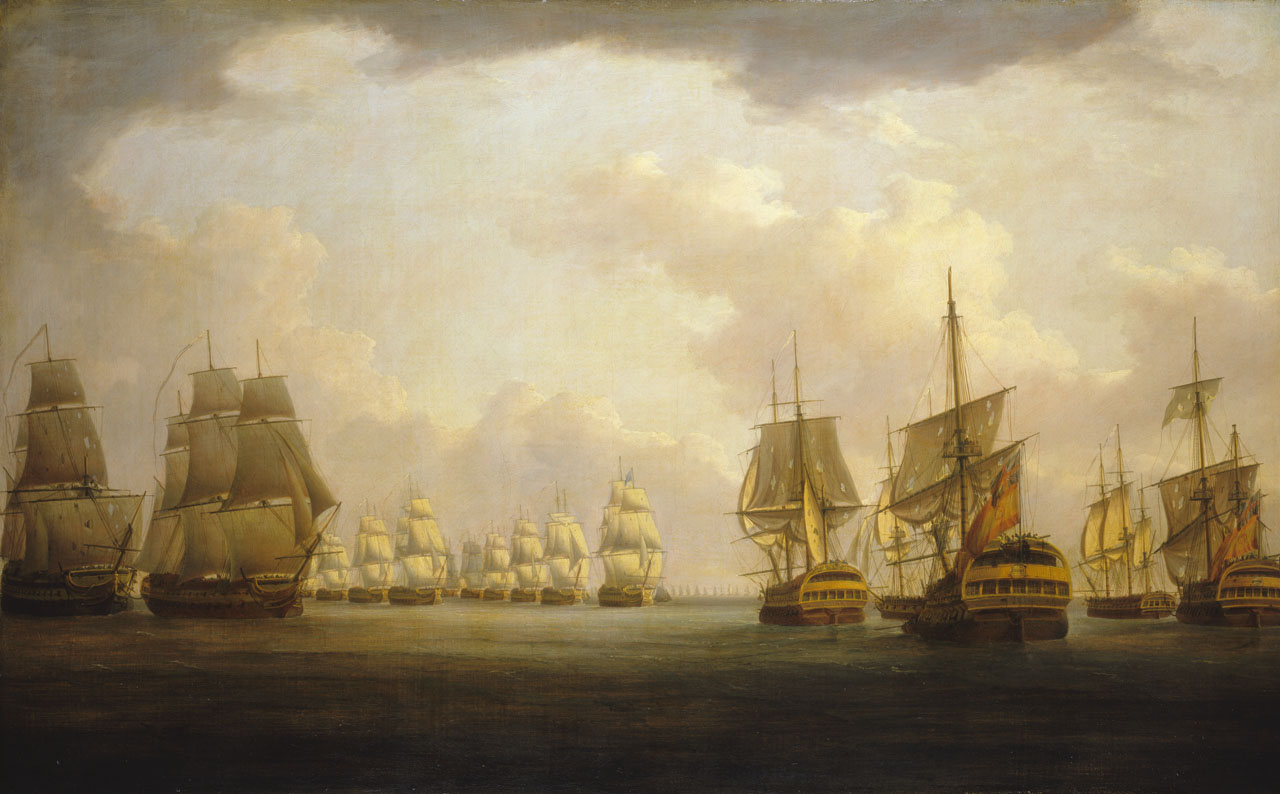
Admiral Sir Robert Calder's action off Cape Finisterre, 23 July 1805, by William Anderson

She joined the fleet in entering Vigo Bay on 28 July, and went into Ferrol on 2 August. Neptune sailed with the rest of the fleet on 9 August, and put into Cádiz on 20 August. After spending several months there, watched by the blockading British fleet under Nelson, Villeneuve decided to put to sea in mid-October. Maistral prepared Neptune for sea, and the fleet sailed from Cádiz on 19 October. While in Cádiz, Villeneuve had described Neptune as being 'In every respect one of the finest and most seaworthy ships of the Fleet.' As the British approached on the morning of 21 October, Villeneuve formed the line of battle heading northwards, with Neptune the twelfth in the line from the lead ship of the van. She was ahead of the flagship, Bucentaure, on her larboard quarter, and astern on the larboard quarter was the 74-gun Redoutable.

== Trafalgar ==
Neptune entered the battle about 25 minutes after the start of the action, having by then drifted to leeward and fallen astern of Redoutable. Neptune should have had the position immediately astern of Bucentaure, but the Spanish 74-gun San Justo, which should have been four places astern of Neptune had drifted up to leeward. Maistral hailed San Justo

The San Justo not being in her station and edging down to place herself on my windward beam hampered me; I at once hailed her to enquire if she knew her station; I told her that mine was to be next astern to the Bucentaure; she replied that she was about to place herself astern of me, which she did not do, and continued to the wind and to fore-reach on me, which made me fall off a little to leeward and to draw away from the flagship, of whom I had been within hail in the first place.

San Justo's captain, Francisco Javier Garstón, blamed the crew's inexperience for failing to keep her station. This would be significant in the coming battle as the position astern of the flagship would be the focus of British attention, and should have been occupied by a powerful ship like the Neptune. Meanwhile, the ship that should have been astern of Neptune, the Spanish 64-gun San Leandro, was following San Justo to leeward, leaving a considerable gap behind the flagship that the British could exploit. Redoutable's captain, Jean Jacques Étienne Lucas, saw the threat, and brought his ship forward in an attempt to close the gap. Despite his efforts, the British were able to break the line between Bucentaure and Redoubtable.

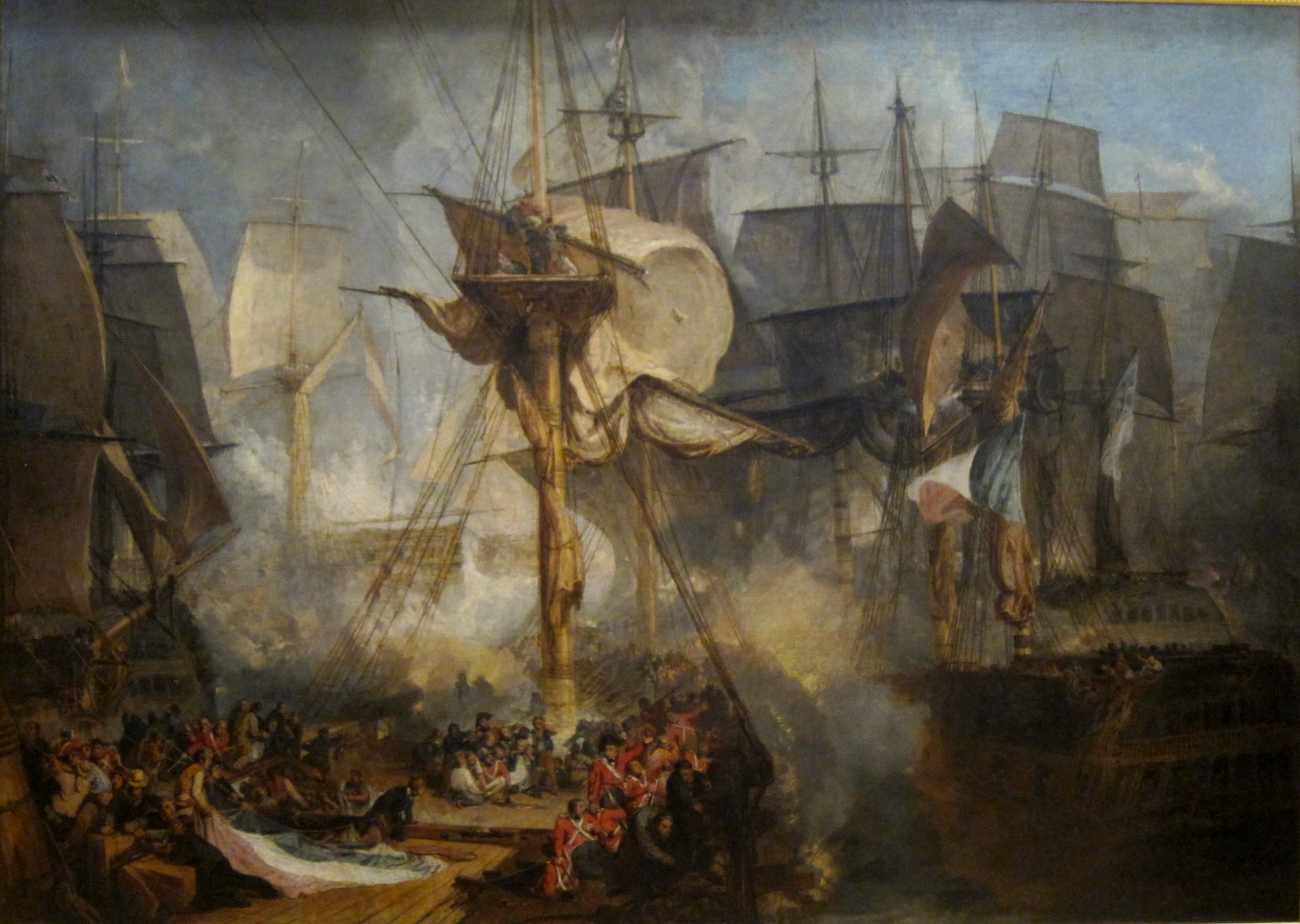
The pell mell battle, depicted by J. M. W. Turner in The Battle of Trafalgar, (1806-1808)

As the battle started Nelson's flagship, HMS Victory broke the line ahead of Neptune, passing by and raking Bucentaure. As Victory passed by Neptune fired into her with a broadside from her larboard battery, damaging Victory's foremast, bowsprit, spritsail yards, her forward hull and her anchors. Maistral then ordered Neptune's jib run up, to move her out of Victory's range. She briefly engaged HMS Royal Sovereign at long range, and then wore back to support Villeneuve. Standing someway off to leeward Neptune's gunners reloaded, and then opened fire with a broadside into HMS Temeraire as the British ship came up through the gap created by Victory's passage. The broadsides cut Temeraire's rigging, brought down her foreyard and main topmast, and damaged her fore mast and bowsprit. By now unmanageable, Temeraire came under fire from the San Justo, lying just astern of Neptune.

Leaving Temeraire, and declining combat with the newly arrived HMS Leviathan, Maistral turned eastward, and at 2.30 pm came alongside the starboard bow of the 74-gun HMS Belleisle. Belleisle had become isolated and took the fire of several French ships until British ships were able to come to her rescue. Neptune battled briefly with the 64-gun HMS Polyphemus, and as the British began to overwhelm the Franco-Spanish fleet, she prepared to run for Cádiz, giving supporting fire for the Principe de Asturias as the Spanish ship withdrew, before joining the retreat to Cádiz. During the fighting Neptune had sustained a relatively minor amount of damage, and had just 15 killed and 39 wounded.

=== Sortie ===
Having come through the battle relatively unscathed, Neptune was able to join the sortie made by Captain Julien Cosmao on 23 October, in an attempt to retake some of the captured prizes. Neptune put to sea in company with two French ships, the 80-gun Indomptable and the 74-gun Pluton, and two Spanish ships, the 100-gun Rayo and the 74-gun San Francisco de Asis. Also with the ships of the line were the smaller French ships that had been present at the battle but had not taken part, the frigates Cornélie, Thémis, Hortense, Rhin and Hermione, and the brigs Furet and Argus.

In preparation for the counter-attack the British cast off several of the prizes and formed a defensive line, allowing the frigates to retake two of the captured prizes, both Spanish ships, the 112-gun Santa Ana and the 80-gun Neptuno. Of the two recaptured ships, only the Santa Ana made it back to Cádiz, when the sortieing ships ran into difficulties in the heavy storm that blew up after the battle. The Neptuno ran aground and was destroyed, while a similar fate befell both the Indomptable, after she grounded off Rota, and the San Francisco de Asis, in Cádiz Bay. The Rayo attempted to anchor off San Lucar and ride out the storm, but rolled out her masts in the heavy seas. HMS Donegal came up, and being unable to resist, Rayo surrendered to her, but was driven on shore on 26 October and wrecked. Neptune had to be towed back into Cádiz.

== Blockade and Spanish service ==
The remains of the French fleet were bottled up in Cádiz under Counter-admiral François Étienne de Rosily-Mesros, trapped there by the British blockade. With the Spanish entry to the war against France on 4 July 1808, Rosily realised that his fleet was in range of now hostile shore batteries. He attempted to move his fleet, consisting of the Neptune, the 74-gun ships Héros, Pluton, Algesiras and Argonaute and the 40-gun frigate Cornélie, out of the harbour, but on 9 July the squadron was attacked by Spanish forces from the land and sea. Rosily attempted to negotiate to keep his fleet, but on this being rejected, was forced to surrender it to the Spanish on 14 July. The Spanish took Neptune into their service, renaming her Neptuno as a replacement for the Neptuno lost at Trafalgar, and she served with them until being broken up in 1820.

== Notes ==
a. The smaller ships were the 40-gun frigates Cornélie, Rhin, Hortense and Hermione, the 36-gun frigates Sirène and Thémis, and the 18-gun brigs Furet and Pleiade.
