= Spanish ship Neptuno (1795) =

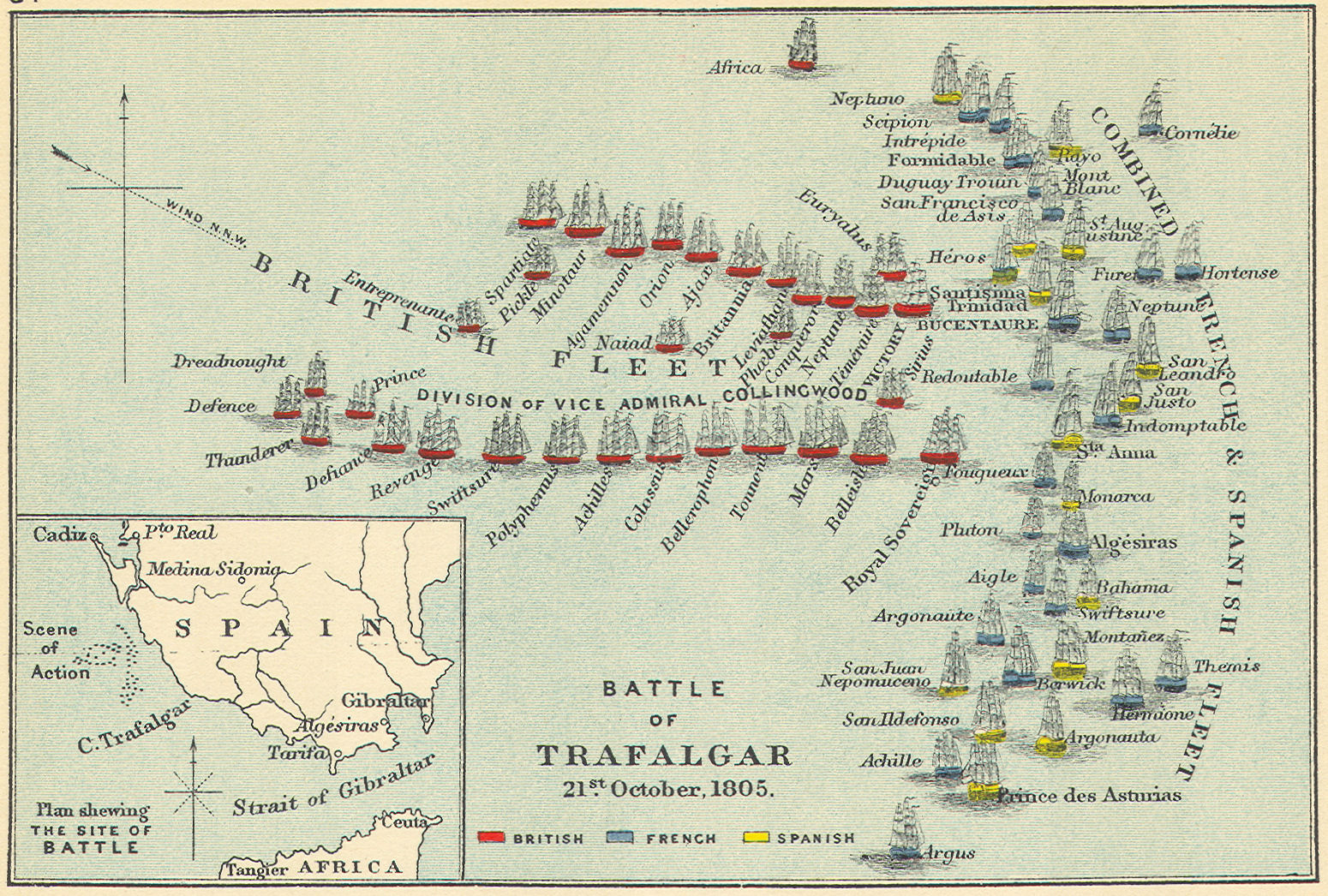
- Map of the Battle of Trafalgar depicting Neptuno

History

Kingdom of Spain
- Name: Neptuno
- Ordered: 3 November 1792
- Builder: Royal Dockyard, Ferrol
- Launched: 26 November 1795
- Fate: Wrecked, 23 October 1805
- Notes: Participated in: Battle of Trafalgar

General characteristics
- Class & type: 80-gun Neptuno-class ship of the line
- Tons burthen: 1781 bm
- Length: 163 ft 7.5 in (49.873 m) (keel); 182 ft 9.6 in (55.717 m) (gundeck)
- Beam: 49 ft 4 in (15.04 m)
- Draught: 26 ft 8 in (8.13 m) (afore); 23 ft 3 in (7.09 m) (abaft)
- Depth of hold: 23 ft 10 in (7.26 m)
- Propulsion: Sails
- Sail plan: Full-rigged ship
- Complement: 715
- Armament: 80 guns: Lower gundeck: 30 × 24-pdrs (later 36-pdrs); Upper gundeck: 32 × 18-pdrs (later 24-pdrs); Quarterdeck: 12 × 8-pdrs; Forecastle: 6 × 8-pdrs; Poop deck: 2 × 4-pdr and 2 × 3-pdr obuses

Neptuno was an 80-gun Neptuno-class ship of the line of the Spanish Navy. She was built in 1795 and took part in the French Revolutionary and Napoleonic Wars. She fought with the Franco-Spanish fleet in the battle of Trafalgar, and was wrecked in its aftermath.

Neptuno was built at Ferrol and launched in 1795. She entered service in time to support an attempt to unite with a French force and land troops in England, but the Spanish fleet under Admiral José de Córdoba y Ramos was intercepted and engaged by a British fleet under Sir John Jervis. Neptuno did not take part in the battle, having been sent into port beforehand. Several years later she was in a Spanish port when the combined Franco-Spanish fleet under Vice-Admiral Pierre-Charles Villeneuve arrived, having sailed to the West Indies and back, and been engaged by a British fleet in the Battle of Cape Finisterre. Neptuno joined the fleet in her attempt to reach Brest, but the plan to join with another French fleet failed and Neptuno ended up with the rest of the fleet, blockaded in Cádiz by a British fleet under Lord Nelson.

Villeneuve came out of Cádiz in late 1805, and was engaged by Nelson in the decisive Battle of Trafalgar on 21 October. As the leading ship of the line, Neptuno was initially isolated from the main fighting, though she joined in an attempt later in the day to come to the aid of Villeneuve's flagship. Instead she became trapped and engaged by two British ships and, after fighting for over an hour, surrendered. She was taken in hand by a British prize crew, but two days after the battle a sortie by some of the survivors from the battle succeeded in retaking her. She was towed towards a friendly port but, already badly damaged in the battle, was caught up in the powerful storm that struck the area and ran aground. Her crew were evacuated, and Neptuno broke up in the heavy seas.

== Construction and commissioning ==
Neptuno was built at the Royal Dockyard at Ferrol as the name ship of the Neptuno-class of 80-gun ships of the line, a design developed by Julián Martín de Retamosa, following on from his earlier 74-gun Montañés of 1794. Her sistership was the Argonauta launched in 1798, which fought alongside Neptuno at Trafalgar. The Neptuno originally carried thirty 24-pounder guns on her lower gundeck, thirty-two 18-pounders on her upper deck, twelve 8-pounders on her quarter deck and six 8-pounders on her forecastle. By 1805 she had been fitted with 36-pounders to replace the 24-pounders on her lower deck, while the 18-pounders on her upper deck had been replaced by 24-pounders; with additional guns added to her quarterdeck and forecastle, she had twelve 8-pounders and eighteen obuses (howitzers), to give her a total of 92 carriage guns. She also mounted a single 10-pounder carronade and (on the poop) eight 4-pounder obuses.

Overall work on the ships of the Neptuno class was overseen by Julián Martín de Retamosa, and Neptuno was launched at Ferrol in 1795. There then followed a period of fitting out and carrying out sea trials during 1796, after which she was assigned to the Spanish Mediterranean fleet at Cartagena under Admiral José de Córdoba y Ramos. Shortly afterwards Spain allied with Republican France and entered the French Revolutionary Wars against Britain and her allies. The Spanish Navy was assigned to support the planned invasion of Britain.

== Alliance with France ==
Neptuno put to sea on 1 February 1797 with the rest of Córdoba's fleet, consisting of 27 ships of the line, twelve frigates, one brig and several smaller craft. They sailed from Cartagena and passed through the Strait of Gibraltar on 5 February. Córdoba had orders to deliver a number of gunboats to Algeciras to support the bombardment of Gibraltar, safely escort a convoy of four urcas carrying mercury from Málaga to Cádiz, and then sail to Brest to link up with the French. The first part of the operation went smoothly, and Neptuno was detached with the 74-gun ships Bahama and Terrible, the 34-gun Nuestra Señora de Guadalupe to take the gunboats into Algeciras. Neptuno and Bahama remained at Algeciras, while Terrible sailed to rejoin Córdoba.

Strong easterly winds prevented Córdoba from making port at Cádiz, and his ships were scattered to the west, before they could make sail back to the Spanish coast. As they approached Cádiz on 14 February his fleet was tracked down off Cape St Vincent by a British force under Sir John Jervis. Neptuno and her consorts took no part in the action that followed, during which the Spanish were defeated.

== Approach to Trafalgar ==
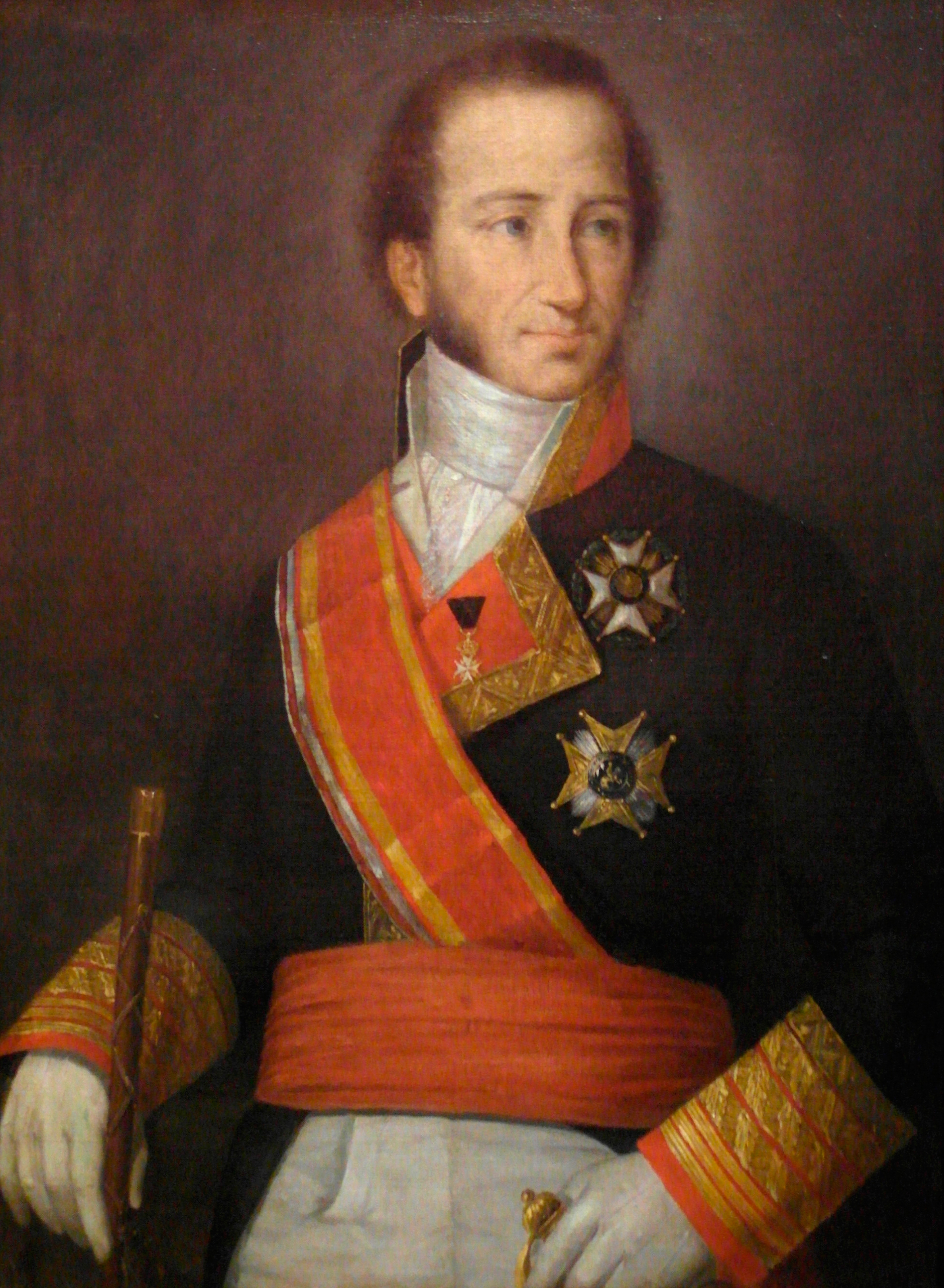
Cayetano Valdés y Flores, who captained Neptuno at Trafalgar

By 1805 Neptuno was based at Ferrol, under the command of Captain Don Cayetano Valdés y Flores. There she was joined in late July by ships of the combined Franco-Spanish fleet under Vice-Admiral Pierre-Charles Villeneuve. The combined fleet had recently arrived in European waters from the West Indies, where they had evaded a British fleet under Lord Nelson, but had failed to carry out any attacks on the British colonies in the Caribbean. The fleet, hotly pursued across the Atlantic by Nelson, had been intercepted by another fleet under Robert Calder that had been positioned off Cape Finisterre in expectation of their arrival. Calder captured two of Villeneuve's ships in a confused action, after which Villeneuve withdrew to Ferrol and Corunna. He sailed again on 9 August, taking the Spanish ships he had found in those ports, including Neptuno, with him, hoping to rendezvous with the French Rochefort squadron under Zacharie Allemand. The hoped-for rendezvous failed: the two French fleets supposedly mistook each other for the main British fleet and, instead of joining, attempted to escape from each other, with Villeneuve fleeing to Cádiz.

After spending several months there, watched by the blockading British fleet under Nelson, Villeneuve decided to put to sea in mid-October. Valdés prepared Neptuno for sea, and the fleet sailed from Cádiz on 19 October. Neptuno was initially the rearmost ship of the combined fleet as it sailed southwards, but as the British approached on the morning of 21 October, Villeneuve formed the line of battle and ordered it to come about heading northwards, with Neptuno now the lead ship of the van. She was ahead of the 74-gun French Scipion, and formed part of the squadron under Rear-Admiral Pierre Dumanoir le Pelley, which had previously been intended as the rear of the fleet.

== Trafalgar ==
Initially isolated by the British strike at the centre and rear of the combined fleet's line, Neptuno was ordered to hug the wind to allow the other ships to get to their stations. Neptuno was fired upon by the 64-gun HMS Africa, which had arrived late to the battle and sailed southwards parallel down the line, exchanging broadsides with the ships of the fleet. Africa's long range fire caused little damage. At 2 pm Dumanoir brought the van around and headed south to support the beleaguered centre, trying to fight his way through to Villeneuve's flagship, the 80-gun Bucentaure. With Dumanoir in the attempt were Neptuno and four French ships, the 80-gun Formidable, and the 74-gun ships Scipion, Duguay-Trouin and the Mont Blanc. Neptuno fought her way through to Bucentaure, with Valdés hoping to use her boats to recapture the flagship. The plan came to nothing when he discovered the boats had been destroyed by gunfire. Neptuno herself was soon in trouble; at 4 pm she was cut off by the two rear-most ships of Nelson's weather column, the newly arrived 74-gun ships HMS Minotaur and HMS Spartiate.

Neptuno fought both of them for the next hour, having her mizzen mast shot away, and her rigging badly damaged. Valdés, who had already been wounded twice during the battle, was hit in the head and neck by falling debris from the collapsing mizzenmast and lost consciousness. He was taken below to be treated, and command devolved to his second, Joaquín Somoza. After an hour of fighting Neptuno lost her fore topmast, the foretop, foreyard and foreshrouds, followed by her main topmast and the main stay. Valdés' successor, Somoza, was also wounded, and First Lieutenant Antonio Miranda took command. Neptuno struck her colours at 5.10 pm, becoming the last of the combined fleet to surrender. Accounts of her casualties vary but they appear to have been relatively light, with 38 to 42 dead and 42 to 47 wounded. She had by now been isolated from the rest of the fleet, and may have surrendered due to declining morale as a result. The British had been aiming high, in order to disable Neptuno and prevent her from escaping. A boarding party of 48 men from Minotaur, led by Marine Second Lieutenant Thomas Reeves arrived on board to take Neptuno's surrender. Valdés was undergoing treatment in the cockpit, so First Lieutenant Antonio Miranda went aboard Minotaur and submitted his sword to her captain, Charles Mansfield. Reeves took off a lieutenant and twenty-five men out of Neptuno and sent them to Minotaur, secured the prisoners aboard Neptuno, locked away the firearms, and placed a guard on the magazine.

== Storm, and wreck ==
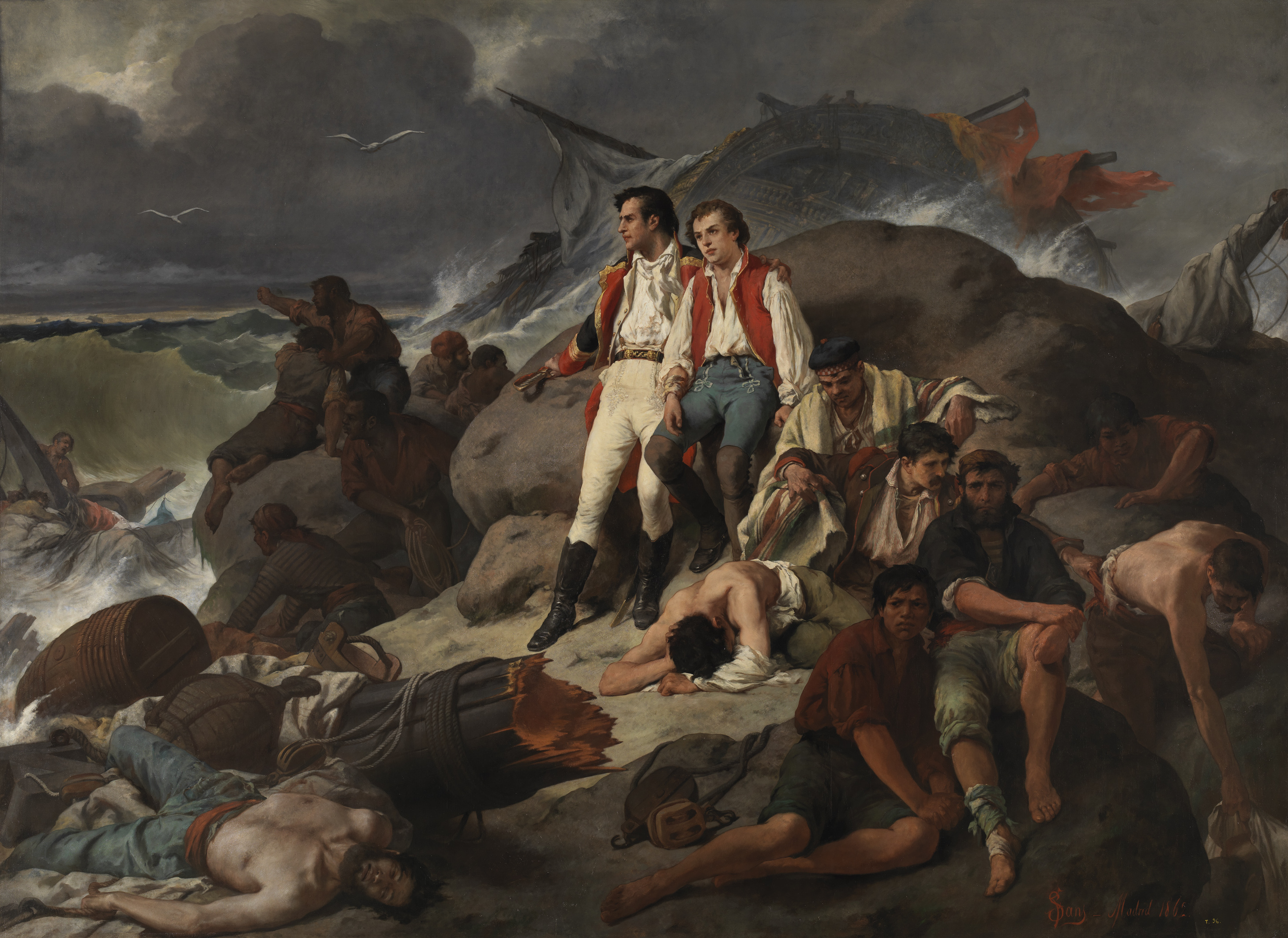
1862 painting of a wrecked Neptuno with her surviving crew on the rocks

Minotaur took Neptuno in tow at 3.30 am the next day, and at daylight work began to clear away the wreckage of battle. As the storm rose, the towline snapped, putting Neptuno in danger of running onto a lee shore and being wrecked. The battered mainmast collapsed on 22 October, smashing through the captain's cabins below the poop, crushing to death Neptuno's paymaster Diego de Soto as he slept and killing one member of the British prize crew. Now completely dismasted the crew struggled to shore up the decks to prevent them from collapsing, and tried to jury rig sails.

On 23 October French Ship-of-the-line Captain Julien Cosmao and Spanish Commodore Enrique MacDonnell made a sortie from Cádiz with some of the more seaworthy ships that had escaped the battle, in an attempt to retake some of the captured prizes. Cosmao's squadron consisted of two French 80-gun ships, Neptune and Indomptable, the 74-gun French Pluton, and two Spanish ships, the 100-gun Rayo and the 74-gun San Francisco de Asis. Also with the ships of the line were the smaller French ships that had been present at the battle but had not taken part, the frigates Cornélie, Thémis, Hortense, Rhin and Hermione, and the brigs Furet and Argus. In preparation for the counter-attack the British cast off several of the prizes and formed a defensive line. While Cornélie, Hortense, Thémis and Rhin harassed the British, Hermione took Neptuno in tow, while the Spanish crew rose up and took back their ship. The British prize crew were sent below to work the pumps, while Neptuno made anchor in Bay of Cádiz. During the night the storm rose again, and Neptuno dragged her anchors and ran onshore.

Lines were quickly passed between the ship and shore, and rafts were constructed to take men off the stricken ship. One raft made several trips to and from the shore, until it capsized, drowning several men. Over the next few days the remaining men, including the wounded Captain Valdés, were taken off by rafts and fishing boats. The abandoned Neptuno was soon pounded to pieces in the heavy seas, with the loss of around 20 men in her wreck. Neptuno was not the only ship to suffer this fate, a number of the captured British prizes were scuttled or left to be wrecked, while several of the ships that had accompanied Cosmao's sortie were lost. The Indomptable was lost after she grounded off Rota, as was the San Francisco de Asis, in Bay of Cádiz. The Rayo attempted to anchor off San Lucar and ride out the storm, but rolled out her masts in the heavy seas. HMS Donegal came up, and being unable to resist, Rayo surrendered to her, but was driven on shore on 26 October and wrecked. Cosmao managed to retake only one other prize aside from Neptuno, the 112-gun Santa Ana. Unlike Neptuno, the Santa Ana made it back to Cádiz.

The remains of the French fleet were bottled up in Cádiz under Rear-Admiral Rosily, trapped there by the British blockade. The remaining ships were seized by the Spanish after they entered the war against France in 1808. One of the French ships taken was the 80-gun Neptune, which had fought at Trafalgar; the Spanish took her into their service, renaming her Neptuno, as a replacement for the ship lost in 1805. This new Neptuno served with the Spanish Navy until being broken up in 1820.

== Bibliography ==
- Adkin, Mark (2007). The Trafalgar Companion: A Guide to History's Most Famous Sea Battle and the Life of Admiral Lord Nelson. London: Aurum Press. ISBN 978-1-84513-018-3.
- Adkins, Roy (2004). Trafalgar: The Biography of a Battle. Little Brown. ISBN 0-316-72511-0.
- Clayton, Tim; Craig, Phil (2005). Trafalgar: The Men, the Battle, the Storm. Hodder & Stoughton. ISBN 0-340-83028-X.
- Goodwin, Peter (2005). The Ships of Trafalgar: The British, French and Spanish Fleets October 1805. Conway Maritime Press. ISBN 1-84486-015-9.
- Mostert, Noel (2008). The Line Upon a Wind: The Greatest War Fought At Sea Under Sail: 1793-1815. London: Vintage Books. ISBN 978-0-7126-0927-2.
- Winfield, Rif; Tredrea, John M; García-Torralba Pérez, Enrique & Blasco Felip, Manuel (2023). Spanish Warships in the Age of Sail 1700—1860: Design, Construction, Careers and Fates. Barnsley, UK: Seaforth Publishing. ISBN 978-1-5267-9078-1.
