= French ship Pluton =

Eight ships of the French Navy have borne the name Pluton in honour of the Roman god Pluto.

== Ships named Pluton ==
- Pluton (1778), a 74-gun ship of the line built at Cherbourg in 1778 which fought at the Battle of the Saintes in the American War of Independence and was renamed Dugommier in 1797.
- Pluton (1805), a 74-gun ship of the line launched at Toulon in 1805 which took part in the Battle of Trafalgar under captain Julien Cosmao.
- Marengo (1810) , a ship of the line was renamed Pluton from 1866 to 1873.
- Pluton (1839–1854), a wheeled corvette.
- Marengo (1810) (1810—1873), a 74-gun Téméraire-class ship of the line, bore the name as a prison hulk.
- Pluton (1910–1923), a minelayer
- Pluton (1927–1939), a minelayer cruiser
- Pluton, a combat diver ship which supports the Naval Commandos.

== See also ==
- HMS Pluto
- Pluto (1801), a privateer cutter
