= French ship Indomptable (1790) =

Ship of the line of the French Navy

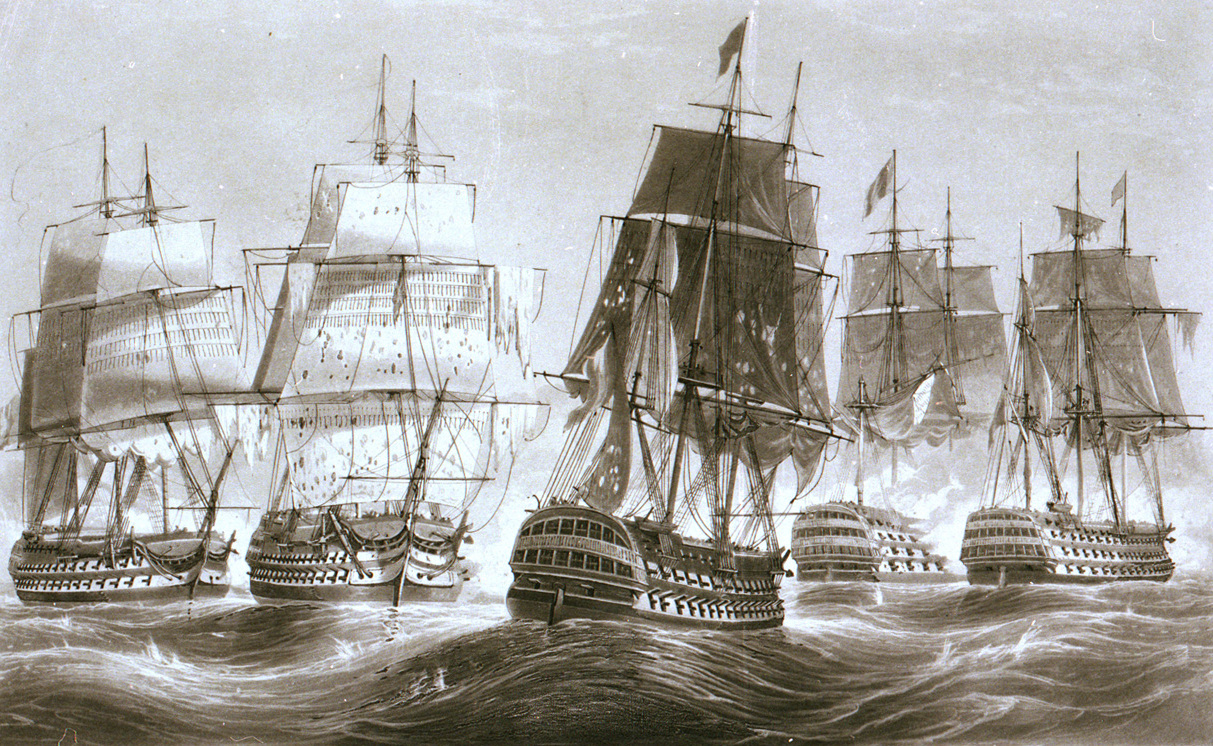
- Indomptable (centre) at the Battle of Trafalgar

History

France
- Name: Indomitable
- Builder: Brest
- Laid down: September 1788
- Launched: 20 December 1790
- Completed: February 1791
- Fate: Wrecked 25/26 October 1805

General characteristics
- Displacement: 3,868 tonneaux
- Tons burthen: 2,034 port tonneaux
- Length: 59.3 m (194 ft 7 in)
- Beam: 15.3 m (50 ft 2 in)
- Draught: 7.8 m (25 ft 7 in)
- Propulsion: Sail
- Sail plan: Full-rigged ship
- Complement: 780
- Armament: 80 guns: 30 36-pounder long guns (Note: French pounds, approx 1.1 British pounds); 32 24-pounder long guns; 18 12-pounder long guns; 4 obusiers de vaisseau
- Armour: Timber

Indomptable ("Indomitable") was a Tonnant-class 80-gun ship of the line in the French Navy, laid down in 1788 and in active service from 1791. Engaged against the Royal Navy after 1794, she was damaged in the Battle of Trafalgar and wrecked near the Spanish city of Cádiz on 25/26 October 1805.

== Early service ==
Indomptable was designed by naval engineer Jacques-Noël Sané and laid down in Brest in September 1788. She was launched on 20 December 1790, and completed in February 1791.

Between 1793 and 1794, she was under Bruix. Her first engagement was on 29 May 1794 against HMS Barfleur and HMS Orion during the Glorious First of June campaign. Following the battle, the dismasted Indomptable was towed back to Brest by Brutus.

In 1795, she served in the Mediterranean under Admiral François Joseph Bouvet and took part in the landing attempt in Ireland planned by General Louis Lazare Hoche. In 1801, she was engaged in the campaign in Egypt, but was unable to break the English blockade and stayed in Toulon. Other elements of the fleet managed to reach Elba.

Indomptable fought in the battle of Algeciras in 1801 when she was again badly damaged. In 1802 and 1803, she served in Toulon under Admiral Latouche Tréville.

== Trafalgar campaign ==
On 17 January 1805, she went to sea under Admiral Villeneuve, together with ten other ships of the line and eight frigates, and on 20 January the fleet sailed for the French Caribbean. Off Cádiz, the fleet was joined by the 74-gun Aigle, and six Spanish ships of the line under Vice-Admiral Federico Gravina. When the fleet reached the West Indies, Villeneuve sent Commodore Cosmao-Kerjulien with the Pluton and the Berwick to attack the British position on Diamond Rock, which surrendered on 2 June. Villeneuve returned to Europe on hearing that Horatio Nelson had arrived in the West Indies.

=== Cape Finisterre and Trafalgar ===
On 22 July 1805, in the battle of Cape Finisterre the quartermasters of Indomptable spotted the British fleet under Sir Robert Calder. After a violent artillery exchange, the fleets became separated in the fog. Exhausted after six months at sea, the fleet anchored in Ferrol before sailing to Cádiz to rest and refit. With his command under question and planning to meet the British fleet to gain a decisive victory, Villeneuve left Cádiz and met the British fleet near Cape Trafalgar.

Indomptable was in the Spanish line between San Justo and Santa Ana at the opening of the Battle of Trafalgar on 21 October 1805. She engaged Vice-Admiral Cuthbert Collingwood's flagship HMS Royal Sovereign off her lee beam as she approached, then raked William Hargood's HMS Belleisle as that ship passed Indomptable's stern. Later, she engaged HMS Revenge, HMS Dreadnought and HMS Thunderer, losing her place in the line but regrouping behind the Spanish flagship Principe de Asturias.

Downwind of the British and effectively out of range, Indomptable turned towards the Bay of Cádiz. At about two in the morning of 22 October, her crew heard distress calls from the French ship Bucentaure which had struck a reef off Santa Catalina fort. The ship's boat was run out and brought alongside Bucentaure, whose crew requested an anchor and hawsers to secure their vessel. This became impractical as Bucentaure settled deeper onto the rocks and began to sink: instead, Indomptable's boats began ferrying sailors off the vessel and back to their own. Rescue efforts continued until mid-afternoon on 23 October, by which time Bucentaure was completely submerged.

== Wreck ==
On the night of 25/26 October, a storm broke Indomptable's anchor chains and she was carried onto rocks offshore from Cádiz. Contemporary accounts estimate between 1,000 and 1,400 people were on board, including around 500 rescued from Bucentaure the previous night, and two men from HMS Conqueror who had been aboard Bucentaure as prize crew. Around 150 men survived the wreck, including just two of the twenty-four officers on board. (Note: The French Navy did not record precise crew numbers aboard Indomptable at the commencement of the Trafalgar engagement, nor was a tally made of the number of sailors rescued from Bucentaure: the figures of between 1,000 and 1,400 are taken from reports of contemporary observers. The estimate of 150 survivors was made by Captain Pernot, whose regiment provided Indomptable's marines.)

== Bibliography ==
- Adkin, Mark (2005). The Trafalgar Companion: A Guide to History's Most Famous Sea Battle and the Life of Admiral Lord Nelson. Aurum. ISBN 1-84513-018-9.
- Adkins, Roy (2004). Trafalgar: The Biography of a Battle. Little, Brown. ISBN 0-316-72511-0.
- Clayton, Tim & Craig, Phil (2004). Trafalgar: The Men, the Battle, the Storm. Hodder & Stoughton. ISBN 0-340-83026-3.
- Fremont-Barnes, Gregory (2005). Trafalgar 1805: Nelson's Crowning Victory. Campaign. Vol. 157. Osprey Publishing. ISBN 1-84176-892-8.
- Goodwin, Peter (2005). The Ships of Trafalgar: The British, French and Spanish Fleets October 1805. Naval Institute Press. ISBN 1-59114-824-3.
- Roche, Jean-Michel (2005). Dictionnaire des bâtiments de la flotte de guerre française de Colbert à nos jours [Dictionary of French Warships from Colbert to Today]. Vol. 1: 1671-1870. Roche. ISBN 978-2-9525917-0-6. OCLC 165892922.
- Taillemite, Étienne (2002). Dictionnaire des Marins français. Tallandier. ISBN 2-84734-008-4. OCLC 606770323.
- Winfield, Rif & Roberts, Stephen S. (2015) French Warships in the Age of Sail 1786-1861: Design, Construction, Careers and Fates. Seaforth Publishing. ISBN 978-1-84832-204-2
