= HMS Fort Diamond =

Sloop of the Royal Navy

History

United Kingdom
- Name: HMS Fort Diamond
- Namesake: Diamond Rock
- Owner: Royal Navy
- Commissioned: 1804
- Out of service: 23 June 1804
- Fate: Captured

General characteristics
- Class & type: sloop
- Complement: 30

HMS Fort Diamond was a six-gun sloop (or cutter), commissioned in 1804 in Martinique. Her origins are unknown. She captured one French privateer before being lost to a French boarding party in June 1804.

== Career ==
Fort Diamond's primary function was as a tender to the newly established British position at Diamond Rock (nominally commissioned as HMS Diamond Rock). She had a crew of 30 men, volunteers from the 36-gun Fifth Rate Emerald, under the command of Emerald's first lieutenant, Thomas Forest.

On the morning of 13 March 1804, Fort Diamond sailed around the Pearl Rock to attack a French privateer schooner. The schooner, unable to sail into the port of Saint-Pierre, Martinique, had anchored close to a shore battery at Ceron, outside the port.

Emerald created a diversion to distract the battery, sending her boats in another direction. While this was underway Pandour arrived and contributed two boats to the diversion.

Forest's tactic was simply to run Fort Diamond into the privateer at a rate of about nine knots. As Fort Diamond bore down on them, the schooner's crew fired a broadside and discharged some small arms before all 50 or 60 crewmen jumped overboard and swam ashore. (The shore battery, not entirely distracted, also fired on Fort Diamond.) The impact of Fort Diamond hitting the privateer broke the chain that anchored the privateer to shore; the boarding party then cut two cables to free her. Fort Diamond's casualties amounted to two men wounded. The privateer turned out to be the Mosambique, armed with ten 18-pounder carronades, though she was pierced for 14 cannon. She was from Guadeloupe, provisioned for a three-month cruise and was under the command of Citizen Vallentes.

Captain James O'Bryan of Emerald reported that she "seems calculated for the King's Service." The Royal Navy took her into service as Mosambique, but sold her in 1810.

== Fate ==
On the evening of 23 June 1804, whilst the Fort Diamond was on a provisioning expedition at Roseau Bay, St. Lucia, a French boarding party from a schooner captured her. Most of her 18-man crew were below decks asleep as the boarding party approached in two rowboats. Fort Diamond's commander, Acting Lieutenant Benjamin Westcott, was on deck where he was fishing from her stern. He challenged the boats as they approached but did not alert the crew. When the boats let loose with small-arms fire he ran below to get a weapon as all the arms were stowed below, there being no chest on deck. He got a cutlass but immediately announced, "It's no use, it's too late." He and his crew then surrendered.

It is not clear how Wescott and his crew returned to British control. Still, the subsequent court-martial aboard Galatea at English Harbour, Antigua, on 4 October convicted Wescott of a violation of Article 10 of the Articles of War. He had neither prepared for an engagement nor encouraged his crew to resist. The Board ordered that he be "struck off the list and name to be put in the Black Book." That is, it dismissed him from the Navy and barred him from ever serving again. (Three years later he became an American citizen.)
