= French ship Pluton (1805) =

Ship of the line of the French Navy

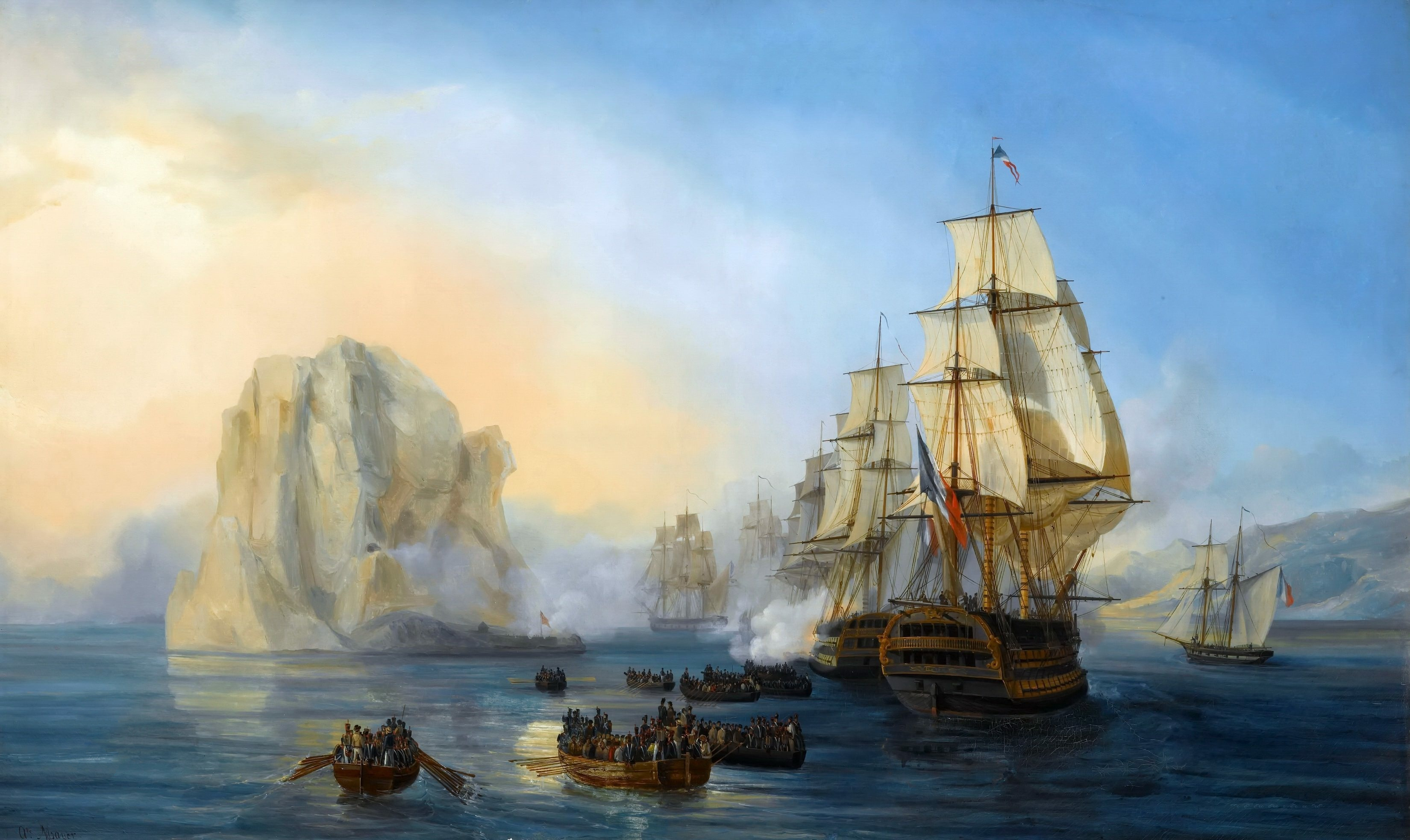
- Taking of the rock Le Diamant, near Martinique, 2 June 1805, by Auguste Étienne François Mayer. Pluton is depicted in the centre-right.

History

France
- Name: Pluton
- Namesake: Pluto
- Ordered: June 1803
- Builder: Toulon
- Laid down: August 1803
- Launched: 17 January 1805
- Completed: March 1805
- Captured: By Spain at Cádiz, 14 June 1808

Spain
- Name: Plutón
- Acquired: 14 June 1808
- Renamed: Montañés
- Fate: Hulked, 1816

General characteristics
- Class & type: petit Téméraire-class ship of the line
- Displacement: 2,781 tonneaux
- Tons burthen: 1,381 port tonneaux
- Length: 53.97 m (177 ft 1 in)
- Beam: 14.29 m (46 ft 11 in)
- Draught: 6.72 m (22.0 ft)
- Depth of hold: 6.9 m (22 ft 8 in)
- Sail plan: Full-rigged ship
- Crew: 705
- Armament: 74 muzzle-loading, smoothbore guns: Lower gun deck: 28 × 36 pdr guns; Upper gun deck: 30 × 18 pdr guns; Forecastle and Quarterdeck: 20 × 8 pdr guns & 6 × 36 pdr carronades

Pluton was a 74-gun petite Téméraire-class ship of the line built for the French Navy during the first decade of the 19th century. Completed in 1805, she played a minor role in the Napoleonic Wars. The ship served in the Trafalgar campaign that same year during which she was a part of the fleet led by Vice-Admiral Pierre-Charles Villeneuve that broke out of Toulon, passed through the Strait of Gibraltar and reached the West Indies. There Pluton led the French forces during the Battle of Diamond Rock, returned to Europe with the fleet and participated in the inconclusive Battle of Cape Finisterre in July and the subsequent Battle of Trafalgar in October.

== Background and description ==
Pluton was one of two prototypes for a smaller version (petit modèle) of the Téméraire class that was specially intended for construction in some of the shipyards in countries occupied by the French, where there was less depth of water than in the main French shipyards. Although the Pluton (and her sister, the Borée) were built at the Arsenal de Toulon, all other vessels of this sub-class were built in these overseas yards, notably at Antwerp but also at Genoa, Trieste, Venice, Amsterdam, Flushing and Rotterdam.

The ships had a length of 53.97 metres (177 ft 1 in), a beam of 14.29 metres (46 ft 11 in) and a depth of hold of 6.9 metres (22 ft 8 in). The ships displaced 2,781 tonneaux and had a mean draught of 6.72 metres (22 ft 1 in). They had a tonnage of 1,381 port tonneaux. Their crew numbered 705 officers and ratings during wartime. They were fitted with three masts and ship rigged.

The muzzle-loading, smoothbore armament of the Téméraire class consisted of twenty-eight 36-pounder long guns on the lower gun deck and thirty 18-pounder long guns on the upper gun deck. The (petit modèle) ordered in 1803–1804 were intended to mount sixteen 8-pounder long guns on their forecastle and quarterdeck, plus four 36-pounder obusiers on the poop deck (dunette). Later ships were intended to have fourteen 8-pounders and ten 36-pounder carronades without any obusiers, but the numbers of 8-pounders and carronades actually varied between a total of 20 to 26 weapons. Pluton herself mounted twenty 8-pounders and six carronades.

== Construction and career ==
Pluton was ordered on 4 January 1803 and named on 7 February. The ship was laid down on 19 August at the Arsenal de Toulon and launched on 17 January 1805. The third rate Annibal had been declared unfit for service and her crew was transferred to Pluton. She was commissioned by Captain Julien Cosmao-Kerjulien on 16 March and completed later that month. The ship was assigned to the Toulon fleet that had been forced to return by severe weather in January a few days after having evaded a British fleet under Vice-Admiral Horatio Nelson that was blockading the port.

=== Trafalgar campaign ===
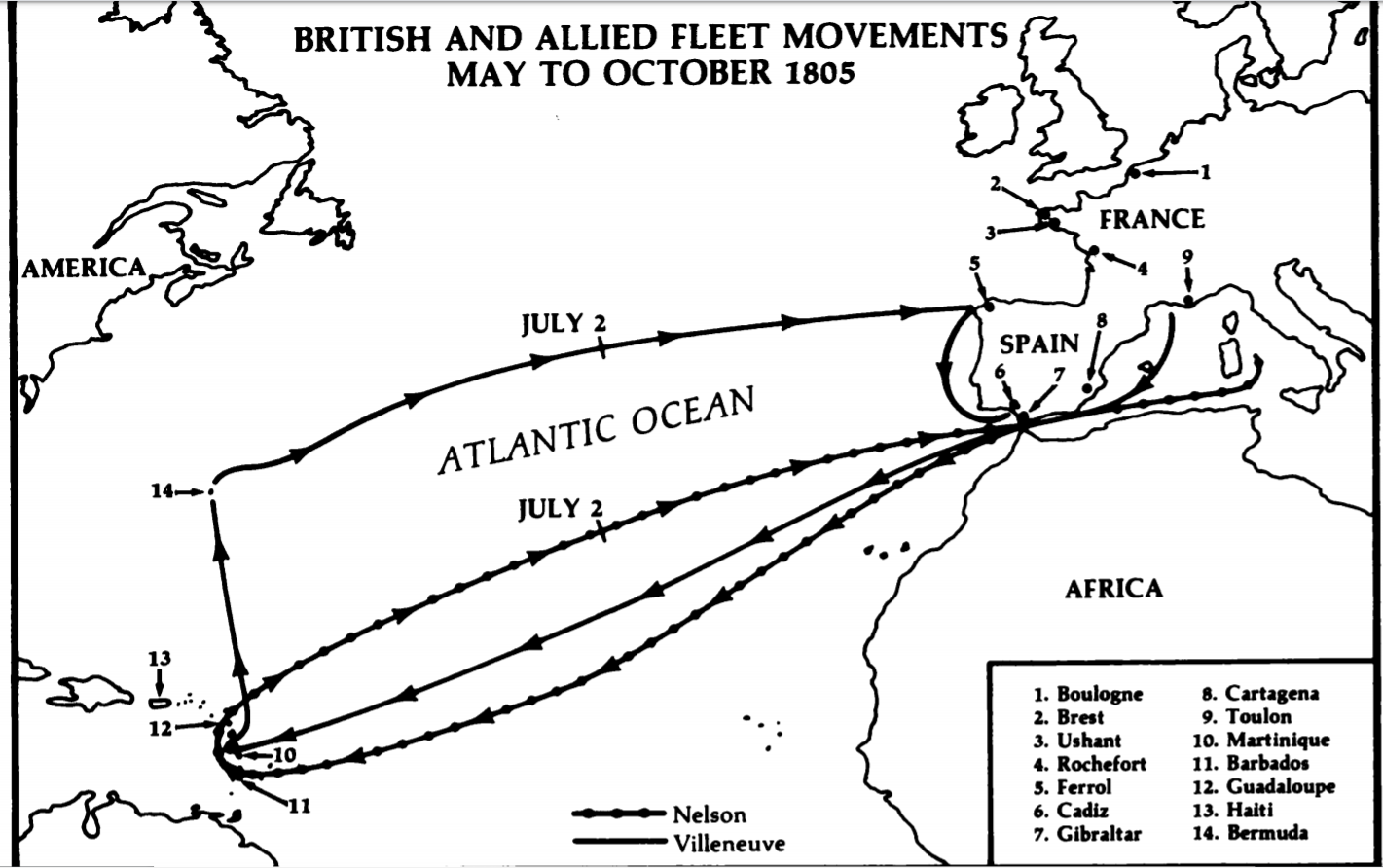
A map of the fleet movements during the campaign

Villeneuve was again successful in evading the blockading British ships during the evening of 29 March and passed through the Strait of Gibraltar on 8 June. He put into Cádiz, Spain, for supplies and reinforcements shortly afterwards before setting sail for the West Indies.

Pluton took part in the Battle of Trafalgar and escaped to Cádiz with other ships. Two days later, on 23 October 1805, she was the flagship of the counter-attack from Cádiz, together with Indomptable, Neptune, Rayo and San Francisco de Asis. They managed to recapture the Santa Ana and Algésiras. To prevent their recapture, the British scuttled the Intrépide and Neptuno.

=== In Spanish service ===
Pluton was captured by Spanish forces in Cadiz on 14 June 1808 and commissioned in the Royal Spanish Navy as Plutón. The ship supported the army in December 1809. She was in Cádiz on 8 March 1810 after having lost her cables in a storm. Plutón was renamed Montañés on 20 April in honor of the 80-gun Montañés which had wrecked during a storm near Cádiz and set on fire by French coastal guns the previous month. The ship was in the Arsenal de La Carraca in 1811 and at Ferrol from 1814–1816. She returned to La Carraca that last year where she was disarmed and hulked.

== See also ==
- List of ships of the line of France
