= French brig Argus (1800) =

Argus
History

France
- Name: Argus
- Builder: Jean Fouache and Enterprise Thibaudier, Le Havre
- Laid down: July 1799
- Launched: 20 July 1800
- Commissioned: May 1802
- Stricken: 31 March 1807
- Fate: Broken up April 1807

General characteristics
- Displacement: 160 tons (French)
- Length: 29.2 m (96 ft)
- Beam: 8.4 m (28 ft)
- Draught: 3.5 m (11 ft)
- Complement: 84
- Armament: 14 × 8-pounder (bronze) guns
- Armour: Timber

Argus was a 16-gun brig of the French Navy, launched in 1800 and broken up at Cayenne in 1807.

== Career ==
Argus was a Vigilant-class brig, designated No. 3 in 1799, of a six-vessel class. She was launched 1800, but not commissioned until 1802.

She was at the battle of Trafalgar, but did not engage in combat.

On 23 October 1805, French Captain Julien Cosmao made a sortie from Cadiz with some of the more seaworthy ships that had escaped the battle, in an attempt to retake some of the captured prizes. Argus was among the sortieing vessels. A storm came up that wrecked many vessels and forced the remains of the French fleet back to Cadiz. There, the Spanish seized a number of them after Spain entered the war against France in 1808. However, Argus was not among the seized vessels.

Argus left Cayenne on 15 March 1806, provisioned for a cruise of four months and in company with the French brig Observateur. Argus was eager to escape and abandoned Observateur, which, however, was able to hold off her attacker. Still, the British captured Observateur on 9 June.

In late 1806, Argus, of sixteen 9-pounder guns and 120 men, and a schooner of two 18-pounder guns and 30 men, encountered HMS Express. The encounter was inconclusive as the French broke off the action and sailed away. Express had three men wounded. She had exhausted all her 18-pounder shot. The governor of Martinique, Admiral Villaret Joyeuse, reportedly cashiered Argus's captain for his failure to capture Express.

Argus fought off Cayenne on 27 January 1807 at the side of Favourite. The British report from the engagement states that Argus was armed with fourteen brass 8-pounder guns, which were the equivalent of English 9-pounders, and had a crew of 120 men.

Argus was condemned and ordered broken up at Cayenne on 31 March 1807. She was decommissioned on 21 April and then broken up.
