= Julien Cosmao =

French Navy officer (1761–1825)

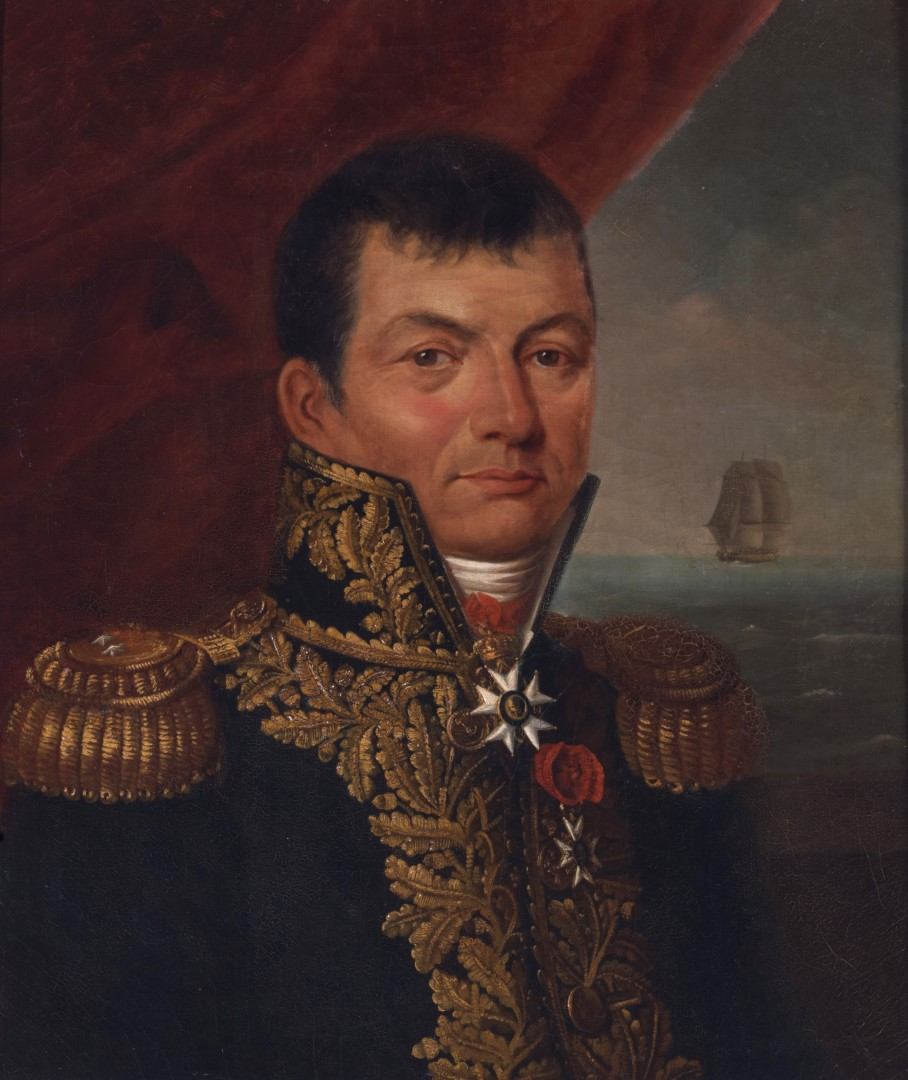
- Portrait by Auguste Étienne François Mayer, c. 1835
- Born: 27 November 1761; Châteaulin, Finistère
- Died: 17 February 1825 (aged 63); Brest, France
- Burial place: St Martin Cemetery, Brest
- Military career
- Allegiance: Kingdom of France; French First Republic; First French Empire
- Branch: French Navy; French Imperial Navy
- Service years: 1776–1816
- Rank: Counter admiral
- Nickname: Va de bon cœur
- Commands: Tonnant; Pluton
- Conflicts: American Revolutionary War; French Revolutionary Wars; Napoleonic Wars; Trafalgar campaign; Battle of Diamond Rock; Battle of Trafalgar; Action of 5 November 1813

Counter-Admiral Julien Marie Cosmao-Kerjulien (27 November 1761 – 17 February 1825) was a French Navy officer who served in the American Revolutionary War and French Revolutionary and Napoleonic Wars. He is best known for his actions during the Battle of Trafalgar.

In 1805, commanding the ship of the line Pluton in Admiral Villeneuve's squadron, he took part in the seizure of the English-held Diamond Rock in Martinique and later fought at the Battle of Cape Finisterre, where he helped save a dismasted Spanish shiph España (1757) that had come under British attack. At Trafalgar itself, after the French and Spanish fleets suffered defeat, Cosmao took command of the surviving squadron as its most senior officer and sailed back out to recapture two Spanish ships that had been taken by the British, while forcing the British to scuttle several of their prizes.

He was promoted to rear admiral in 1806 and later made a Baron of the Empire in 1810. During the Hundred Days in 1815, Emperor of the French Napoleon appointed him maritime prefect of Brest and made him a Peer of France. He retired after the Second Bourbon Restoration and died in Brest in 1825. His name is engraved on the Arc de Triomphe in Paris.

== Career ==
=== Early career ===
Completing his studies in Châteaulin, young Cosmao-Kerjulien joined the French Navy in 1776, against his parents' will. He served in Aigrette in the West Indies. Back in Brest, France in 1778, he served on Oiseau with Corentin de Leissegues. In September, after the beginning of the American Revolutionary War, he served on the Nymphe, taking part in two battles against British privateers near Bordeaux and Belle-Isle.

Between January 1779 and April 1781, he served off Guyana aboard the brig Hirondelle, fighting two more British privateers and capturing two British East Indiamen. He was promoted to lieutenant of a frigate in September 1781. He served successively aboard Pégase in February 1782 and the Protecteur in March before taking command of the fluyt Fidèle in Terre Neuve from May 1783 to April 1784. In January 1785 he served on Lourde, on Vigilante on October and Dorade in April 1786. He was made a sub-lieutenant on a ship of the line in March 1786.

In September 1787, he was given command of the brig Vaneau, and of Boulonnaise from November 1787 to March 1790. From October 1790 to January 1791, he was first officer aboard Précieuse. From February 1791, he served aboard Orion of the squadron of Laurent Jean François Truguet in Toulon. He was made ship of the line full lieutenant in January 1792, and received command of the corvette Sincère in April. He took part in the landing at Cagliari in January 1793.

=== Captain ===
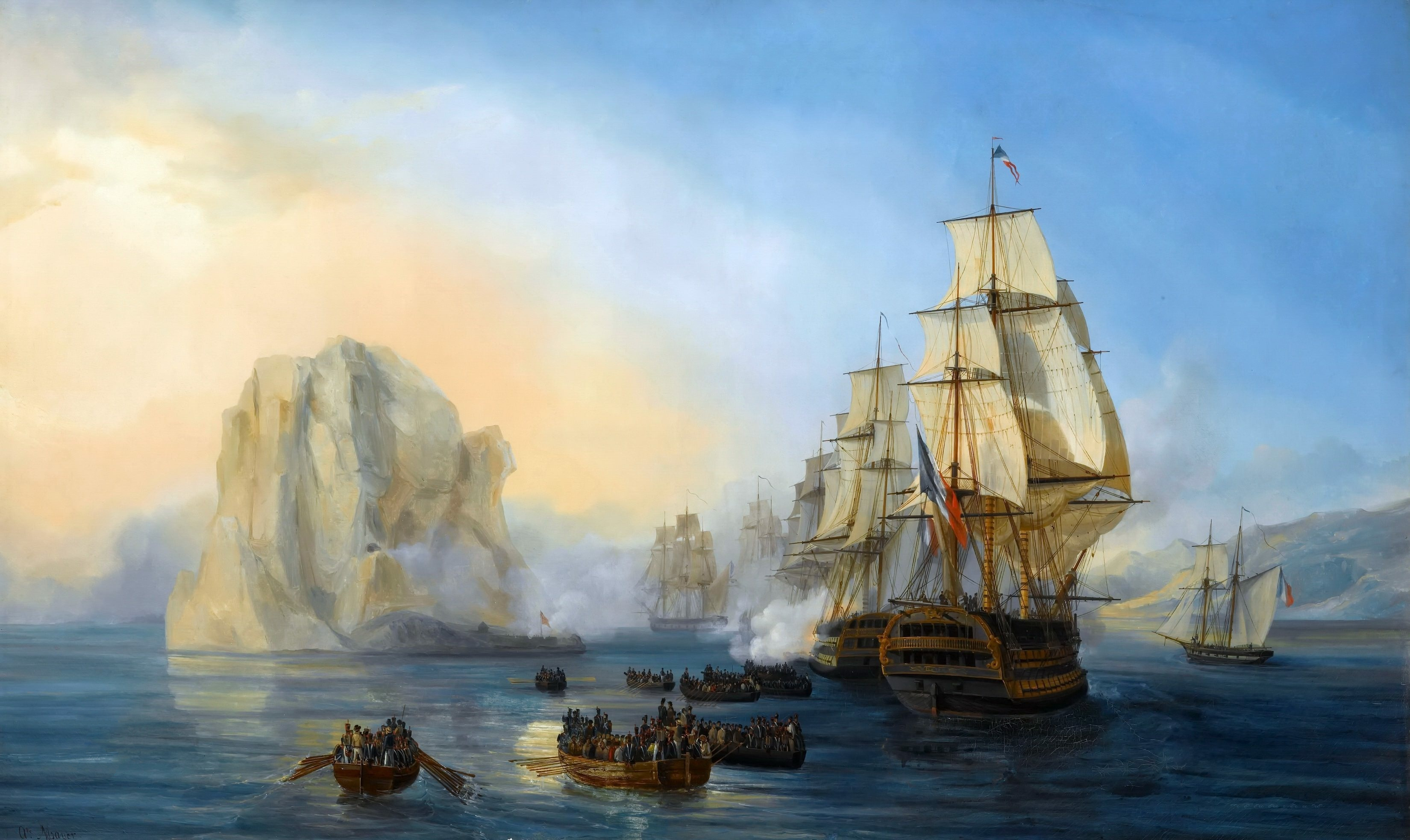
The Franco-Spanish squadron under Cosmao attacking Diamond Rock in 1805

In the context of the lack of qualified officers due to the French Revolution, he was made Capitaine de Vaisseau in April 1793, serving aboard Commerce de Marseille, Centaure and Duguay-Trouin, under Rear-Admiral Trogoff de Kerlessy. In December 1794 he was transferred to the squadron commanded by Pierre Martin, where he commanded the 80-gun ship of the line Tonnant. He took part in the Battle of Genoa in March 1795 (where the French lost two ships of the line) and Battle of the Hyères Islands (where the French lost the 74-gun Alcide).

In June 1797, he was made chief of division, commanding the Jemmapes in the Mediterranean. From 1801 to 1803, he served under Dordelin in Saint-Domingue, commanding French ship Océan, the Alliance and the French ship Mont Blanc. Back to France, he assumed command of the 74-gun Pluton in the squadron of Admiral Villeneuve in Toulon. He accompanied the squadron to the West Indies and took part in the capture of the Diamond Rock from the British, 6 nautical miles (11 km) away from Martinique. Back to Europe, he took part in the Battle of Cape Finisterre, on 22 July, preventing one Spanish warship from being captured by the British.

=== Battle of Trafalgar ===
At the Battle of Trafalgar, Pluton was part of the reconnaissance squadron created by Villeneuve and commanded by Spanish Admiral Federico Gravina. She followed the French ship Fougueux in the line of battle, in the rear. When Admiral Collingwood attacked, Pluton opened fire on HMS Royal Sovereign, then manoeuvered in order to block HMS Mars, damaged her with artillery fire and attempted to board and seize her. However, the arrival of HMS Tonnant in her stern forced her to turn. She engaged HMS Belleisle, already damaged by the fire of Fougueux; another British ship, HMS Polyphemus, forced her to disengage. She then helped the surrounded Spanish ship Principe de Asturias of Gravina, and succeeded in freeing her.

However, at this point, the battle was already lost for the French. At sunset, five French ships (Pluton, Héros, Neptune, Indomptable and Argonaute and six Spanish ships tried to return to Cádiz, under a mortally wounded Gravina. On 23 October, Cosmao, as one of the most senior officers present, jointly took command of the squadron with Spanish Commodore Enrique MacDonell, and set back to sea with five ships: Pluton, Héros, Neptune, San Francisco de Asis, and Rayo. Cosmao later tried to claim sole credit for the sortie but this is not correct as both MacDonell and Cosmao both had Commodore pennants raised. He managed to retake Neptuno and Santa Ana along with forcing the British to scuttle several of their prizes. However, Neptuno and Rayo sank during the return journey and Indomptable was wrecked with the deaths of over 1,000 men, resulting in Cosmao's squadron returning to Cádiz with less ships then they set out with.

=== Late career ===
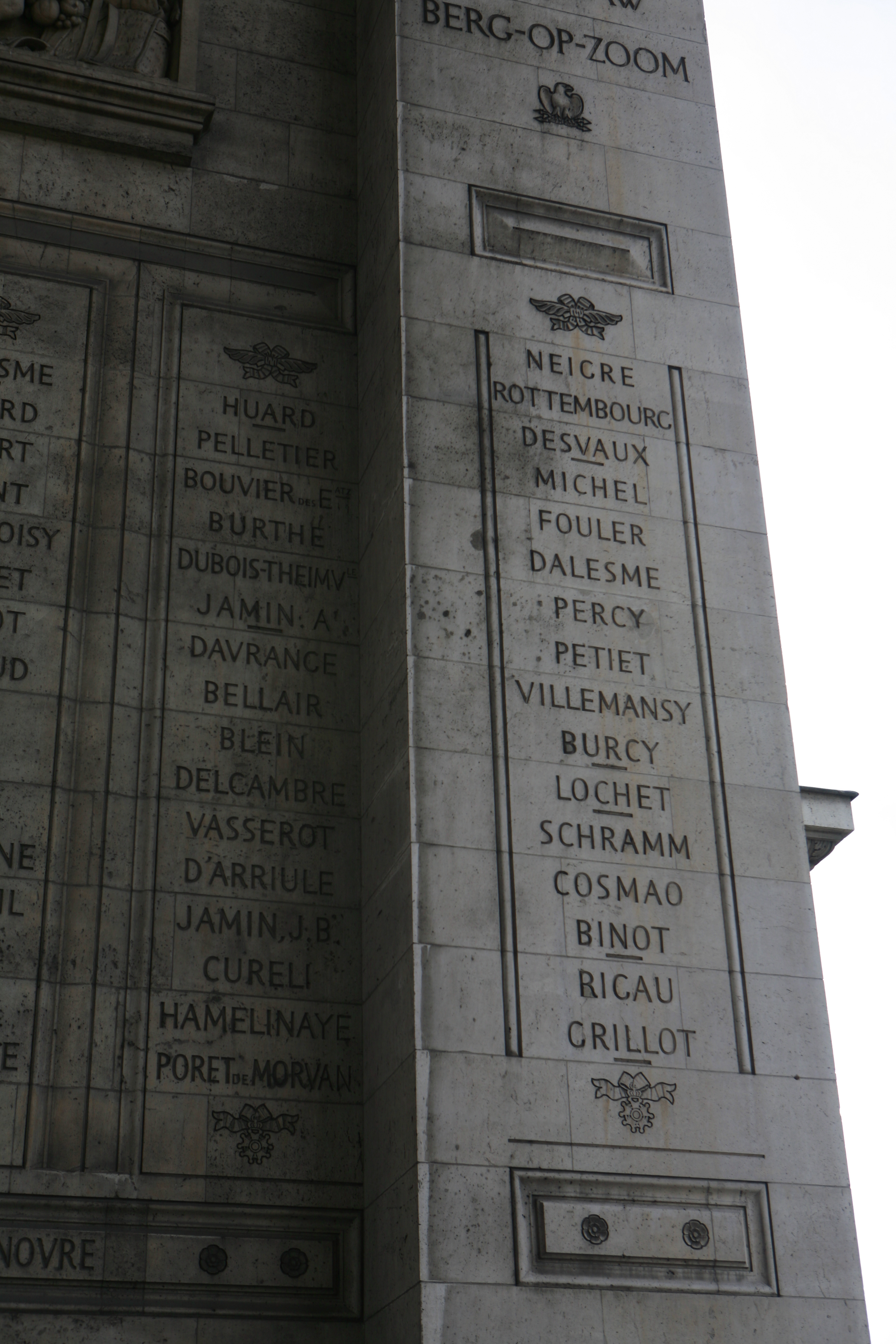
Cosmao's name on the Arc de Triomphe (fourth from bottom right)

Cosmao-Kerjulien was made Rear Admiral on 29 May 1806. He took command of a division of the French Mediterranean Fleet, under Honoré Joseph Antoine Ganteaume from 1807. he took part in operations to resupply Corfu and to the landing in Sicily. His 4 ships, having sustained damage, retreated to Taranto. In late 1809, Ganteaume was organising reinforcements to Barcelona. Cosmao set his flag on Robuste and took command of a squadron comprising Donawerth, Génois, Borée and Lion, as well as the frigates Pauline and Pénélope, and a dozen of transports. The fleet departed Toulon on 24 April 1809, and returned on 1 May without incident.

Cosmao was made Baron of the Empire in 1810. In August 1811, he served under Admiral Édouard Thomas Burgues de Missiessy in the Escaut Squadron, commanding a division, with his flag in the ship-of-the-line Tilsit. In 1813 he returned to the Mediterranean Fleet, where he commanded a 5-ship division, with his flag on the Wagram. At the action of 5 November 1813, he saved the 74-gun Agamemnon and the frigates Pénélope and Melpomène which were surrounded by superior British forces. In February 1814, he set sail with three ships from Toulon to Genoa, threatened by the Austrians, to bring back the Scorpion. He escaped the forces of Admiral Pellew and successfully returned to Toulon on the 10th with the Scorpion without losing a ship, though the Romulus, at the rear, did suffer some damage.

During the First Restoration, in April 1814, Cosmao-Kerjulien received command of the Mediterranean Fleet, and was appointed a Knight of the Order of Saint Louis. In 1815, upon the Emperor's brief return to power, he rallied to Napoleon, who made him préfet maritime of Brest in March, and a Peer of France in June, right before the Battle of Waterloo. Cosmao-Kerjulien was retired on 1 January 1816, and for one year he did not receive a pension. At the time of his retirement, he was 55, with 25 year in campaigns, and 11 battles without once being wounded or captured. He died at 64, on 17 February 1825. Five paintings of him can be seen in the town house of his home town of Châteaulin, in the Finistère.

== Honours ==
"The best sailor of the time; none was ever braver and more generous" -- Napoléon

- Cosmao's name is engraved on the Arc de Triomphe in Paris.
- Legion of Honour from 7 April 1812
- chevalier de Saint-Louis from 5 July 1814
- Pair de France
