= French brig Furet (1801) =

Furet
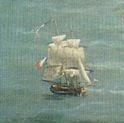
- Furet

History

France
- Name: Furet
- Namesake: Ferret
- Ordered: 24 December 1800
- Builder: Toulon Dockyard
- Laid down: September 1801
- Launched: 24 December 1801
- Commissioned: 1802
- Captured: 27 February 1806

General characteristics
- Class & type: Abeille-class brig
- Displacement: 350 ton (French)
- Length: 32 m (105 ft)
- Beam: 8.7 m (29 ft)
- Draught: 3.5 m (11 ft)
- Sail plan: Brig
- Complement: 141
- Armament: 16 × 8-pounder guns
- Armour: Timber

Furet, launched in 1801, was an Abeille-class brig of the French Navy. HMS Hydra captured her on 27 February 1806, off Cadiz.

== Career ==
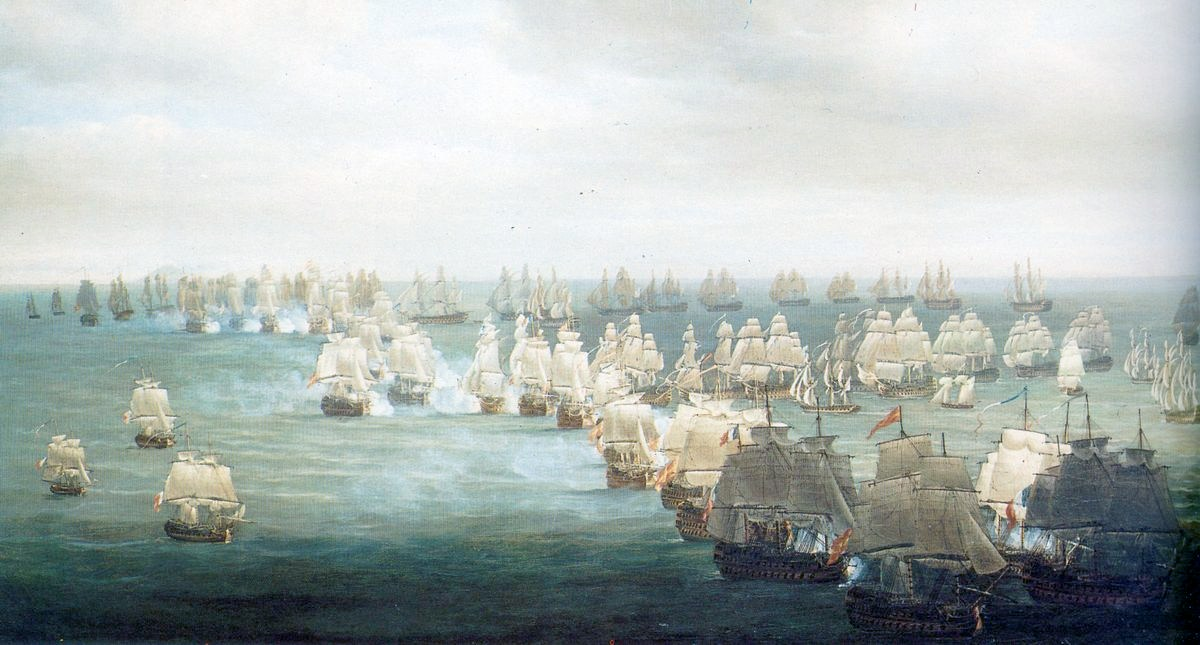
Furet far left foreground at the Battle of Trafalgar, by Nicholas Pocock

Lieutenant de vaisseau Demay commissioned Furet on 25 February 1802. On 23 June 1802, he sailed on a secret mission from Toulon to Mahon, and return.

Furet, with Demay still in command, sailed with Admiral Villeneuve's fleet from Toulon on 29 March 1805 to Martinique. She returned to Europe with the fleet and then participated in both the battles of Finisterre and Trafalgar. She ended up at Cadiz, blockaded with the other survivors of the battle. At Cadiz she became part of the division under Lamare de La Meillerie.

She was under the command of lieutenant de vaisseau Jourdan de la Passardiere when she joined a sortie by the frigates Hortense, Rhin, Hermione, and Thetis, sailing for Guyana. She fell behind the others, which led to her capture off Cadiz.

== Capture ==
After Trafalgar, Furet found herself blockaded in Cadiz.

Captain Julien Cosmao decided to sortie from Cadiz on 23 October, in an attempt to retake some of the vessels the British had captured at Trafalgar. He put to sea in company with five ships of-the-line, three French, the 80-gun Indomptable and Neptune, and the 74-gun Pluton, and two Spanish, the 100-gun Rayo and the 74-gun San Francisco de Asis. Some smaller French ships that had been present at the battle but had not taken part accompanied the ships of the line: the frigates Cornélie, Thémis, Hortense, Rhin, and Hermione, and the brigs Furet and Argus. In preparation for the counter-attack the British cast off several of the prizes and formed a defensive line, allowing the frigates to retake two of the captured prizes, both Spanish ships, the 112-gun Santa Ana and the 80-gun Neptuno. Of the two recaptured ships, only Santa Ana made it back to Cadiz, when the sortieing ships ran into difficulties in the heavy storm that blew up after the battle. Neptuno ran aground and was destroyed, while a similar fate befell both Indomptable, after she grounded off Rota, and San Francisco de Asis, in Cadiz Bay. Rayo attempted to anchor off San Lucar and ride out the storm, but rolled out her masts in the heavy seas. HMS Donegal came up, and being unable to resist, Rayo surrendered to her, but was driven on shore on 26 October and wrecked. Neptune had to be towed back into Cadiz.

The survivors, including Furet took refuge at Cadiz, where they remained into February 1806. To try to lure them out, Vice-Admiral Cuthbert Collingwood pulled his ships-of-the-line ten leagues out to sea, leaving only the frigate Hydra, under Captain George Mundy, and the brig-sloop Moselle in close blockade. On 23 February a strong easterly wind drove the British off their station, which led the French commander, Captain Lameillerie, to seize the opportunity to escape.

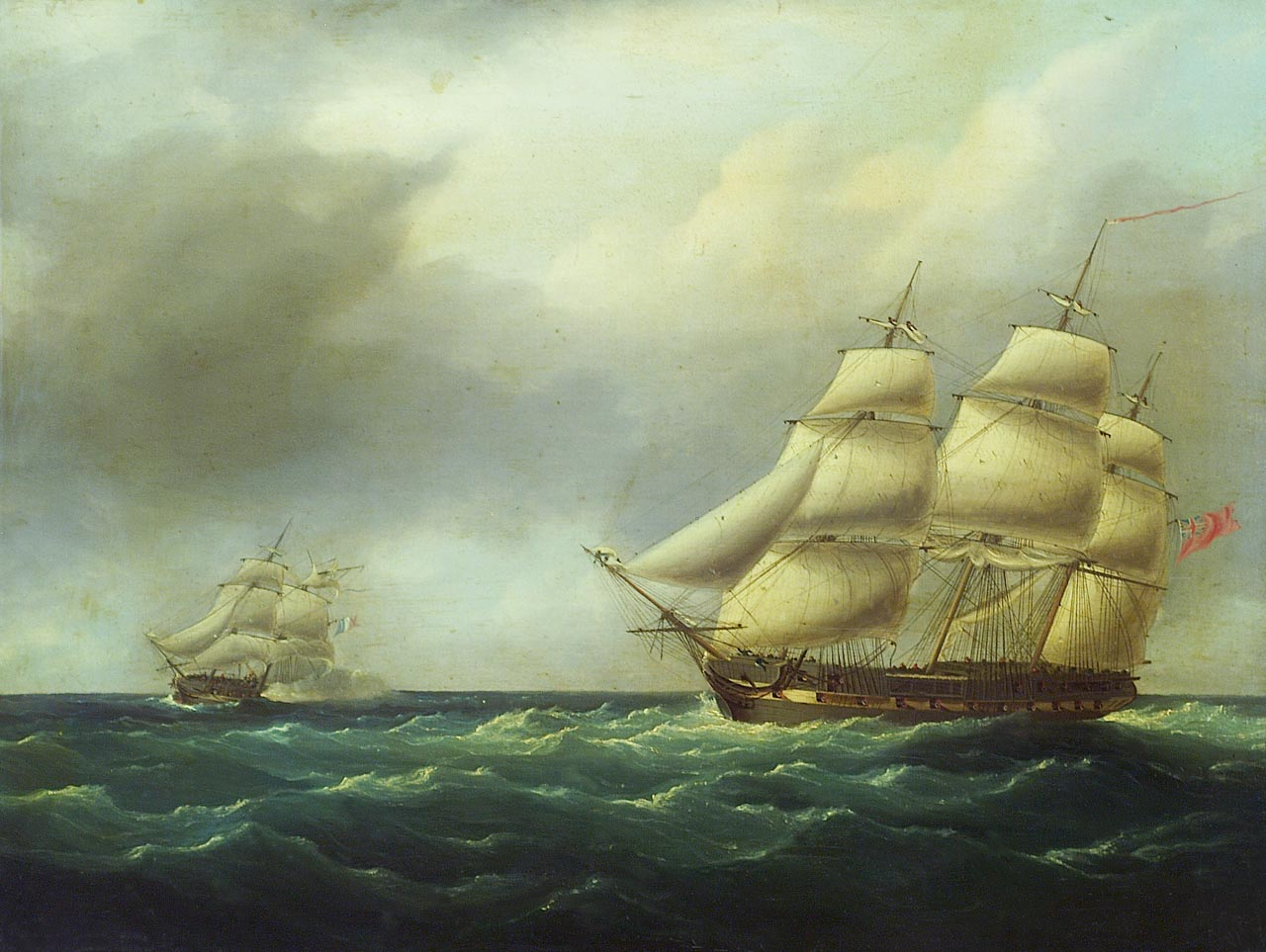
Furet and Hydra in action, by George Chambers

On the evening of 26 February Hydra and Moselle were three leagues west of the Cadiz lighthouse when they sighted the French squadron, comprising the 40-gun frigates Cornélie, Rhin, Hortense and Hermione, and Furet. Mundy began firing rockets and alarm guns to alert Collingwood, while sailing parallel to the French squadron. Mundy then sent Carden in Moselle to try to locate the British fleet. On the morning of 27 February Moselle reached Collingwood, who despatched three frigates to try to catch the French. In the meantime, Hydra had managed to isolate Furet from her companions, and after a two-hour chase, captured her. The French frigates did not come to their brig's aid, and after firing a pro forma broadside, Furet surrendered. Furet was armed with eighteen 9-pounder guns, and had a crew of 130 men under the command of lieutenant de vaisseau Demay. She was provisioned for a cruise of five months. Under the rules of prize-money, Moselle shared in the proceeds of the capture of Furet.

During the next six months, Lamellerie's frigate squadron cruised the Atlantic, visiting Senegal, Cayenne and the West Indies, but failed significantly to disrupt British trade.
