= Battle of Cape Finisterre (1805) =

1805 battle of the War of the Third Coalition

- Part of the Trafalgar campaign of the War of the Third Coalition
- Painting of the battle by William Anderson
Date	22 July 1805
Location	Off Cape Finisterre, Atlantic Ocean 42.8941°N 9.2711°W
Result	Inconclusive

Belligerents
United Kingdom	France; Spain

Commanders and leaders
Robert Calder	Pierre-Charles Villeneuve; Federico Gravina

Strength
15 ships of the line 2 frigates 1 lugger 1 cutter	20 ships of the line 7 frigates

Casualties and losses
41 killed 162 wounded	158 killed 320 wounded 1,200 captured 2 ships of the line captured
- Location within Europe

In the Battle of Cape Finisterre (22 July 1805) off Galicia, Spain, the British fleet under Admiral Robert Calder fought an indecisive naval battle against the combined Franco-Spanish fleet which was returning from the West Indies. In the ensuing battle the British captured two Spanish ships of the line, but failed to prevent the joining of French Vice-admiral Pierre-Charles Villeneuve's fleet to the squadron of Ferrol and to strike the shattering blow that would have freed Great Britain from the danger of an invasion. Calder was later court-martialled and severely reprimanded for his failure and for avoiding the renewal of the engagement on 23 and 24 July. At the same time, in the aftermath Villeneuve elected not to continue on to Brest, where his fleet could have joined with other French ships to clear the English Channel for an invasion of Great Britain.

== Background ==
The fragile Peace of Amiens of 1802 had come to an end when Napoleon formally annexed the Italian state of Piedmont and on 18 May 1803 Britain was once again at war with France. Napoleon planned to end the British blockade by invading and conquering Britain. By 1805 his Armée d'Angleterre was 150,000 strong and encamped at Boulogne. If this army could cross the English Channel, victory over the poorly trained and equipped militias was very likely. The plan was that the French navy would escape from the British blockades of Toulon and Brest and threaten to attack the West Indies, thus drawing off the British defence of the Western Approaches. The combined fleets would rendezvous at Martinique and then double back to Europe, land troops in Ireland to raise a rebellion, defeat the weakened British patrols in the Channel, and help transport the Armée d'Angleterre across the Straits of Dover.

French Vice-admiral Pierre-Charles Villeneuve sailed from Toulon on 29 March with eleven ships of the line, six frigates and two brigs. He evaded Admiral Nelson's blockading fleet and passed the Strait of Gibraltar on 8 April. At Cádiz, he drove off the British blockading squadron and was joined by six Spanish ships of the line. The combined fleet sailed for the West Indies, reaching Martinique on 12 May. Nelson was kept in the Mediterranean by westerly winds and did not pass the Strait until 7 May. The British fleet of ten ships reached Antigua on 4 June.

Villeneuve waited at Martinique for Admiral Honoré Joseph Antoine Ganteaume's Brest fleet to join him, but it remained blockaded in port. Pleas from French army officers for Villeneuve to attack British colonies went unheeded—except for the recapture of the island fort of Diamond Rock—until 4 June when he set out from Martinique. On 7 June he learned from a captured British merchantman that Nelson had arrived at Antigua, and on 11 June Villeneuve left for Europe, having failed to achieve any of his objectives in the Caribbean. While in the Antilles, the Franco-Spanish fleet ran into a British convoy worth 5 million francs escorted by the frigate Barbadoes, 28 guns, and sloop Netley. Villeneuve hoisted general chase and two French frigates with the Spanish ship Argonauta, 80 guns, captured all the ships but one escort.

On 30 June the combined squadron captured and burned a 14-gun British privateer. On 3 July the fleet recaptured the Spanish galleon Matilda, which carried an estimated cargo of 15 million francs, from the Liverpool privateer Mars, which was towing her prize back to Britain. The privateer was burned and the merchant was taken in tow by the Sirène. The fleet sailed back to Europe. On 9 July the French ship Indomptable lost its main spar in a gale that damaged some other vessels slightly. The Atlantic crossings had been very difficult, according to Spanish Admiral Gravina, who had crossed the Atlantic eleven times. So, with some ships in bad condition, tired crews and scarce victuals, the combined fleet sighted land near Cape Finisterre on 22 July.

== Battle ==
News of the returning French fleet reached Vice Admiral Robert Calder on 19 July. He was ordered to lift his blockade of the ports of Rochefort and Ferrol and sail for Cape Finisterre to intercept Villeneuve. The fleets sighted each other at about 11:00 on 22 July.

After several hours of manoeuvring to the south-west, the action began at about 17:15 as the British fleet, with Hero (Captain Alan Gardner) in the vanguard, bore down on the Franco-Spanish line of battle. In poor visibility, the battle became a confused melee. Malta formed the rear-most ship in the British line in the approach to the battle, but as the fleets became confused in the failing light and thick patchy fog, Malta, commanded by Sir Edward Buller, found itself surrounded by five Spanish ships. During a fierce engagement in which Malta suffered five killed and forty wounded, the British ship battled it out, sending out devastating broadsides from both port and starboard.

At about 20:00, Buller forced the Spanish 80-gun San Rafael to strike, and afterwards sent the Malta's boats to take possession of the Spanish 74-gun Firme. Calder signalled to break-off the action at 20:25, aiming to continue the battle the next day. In the failing light and general confusion, some ships continued to fire for another hour.

Daybreak on 23 July found the fleets 27 kilometres (17 mi) apart. Calder was unwilling to attack a second time against superior odds. He had to protect the damaged Windsor Castle and Malta with her large captured Spanish prizes and considered the possibility that the previously blockaded fleets at Rochefort and Ferrol might put to sea and effect a junction with Villeneuve's combined fleet. Accordingly, he declined to attack and headed northeast with his prizes.

Villeneuve's report claims that at first he intended to attack, but in the very light breezes it took all day to come up to the British and he decided not to risk combat late in the day. On 24 July a change in the wind put the Franco-Spanish fleet to the windward of the British—the ideal position for an attack—but instead of attacking, Villeneuve turned away to the south. When he arrived at A Coruña on 1 August, he received orders from Napoleon to proceed immediately to Brest and Boulogne, but perhaps believing a false report of a superior British fleet in the Bay of Biscay, he returned to Cádiz, arriving on 21 August.

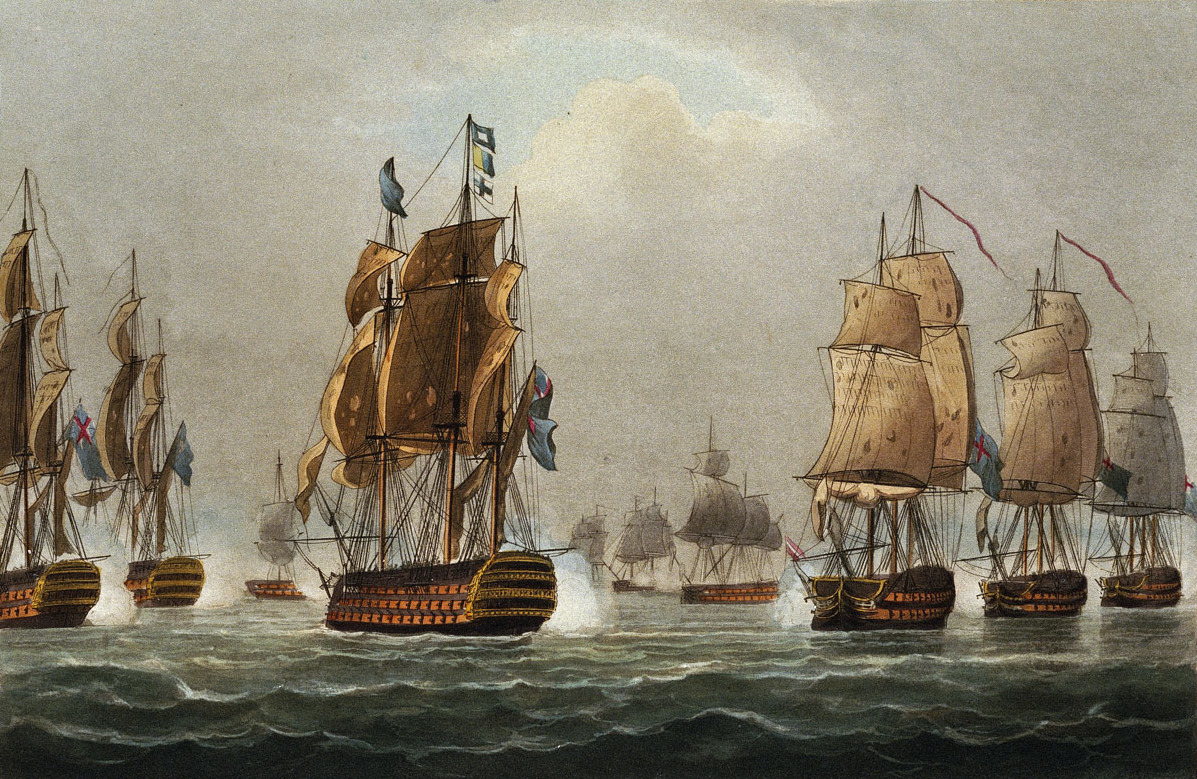
Defiance, Windsor Castle, Prince of Wales, Repulse, Raisonable, and Glory, an engraving after Thomas Whitcombe

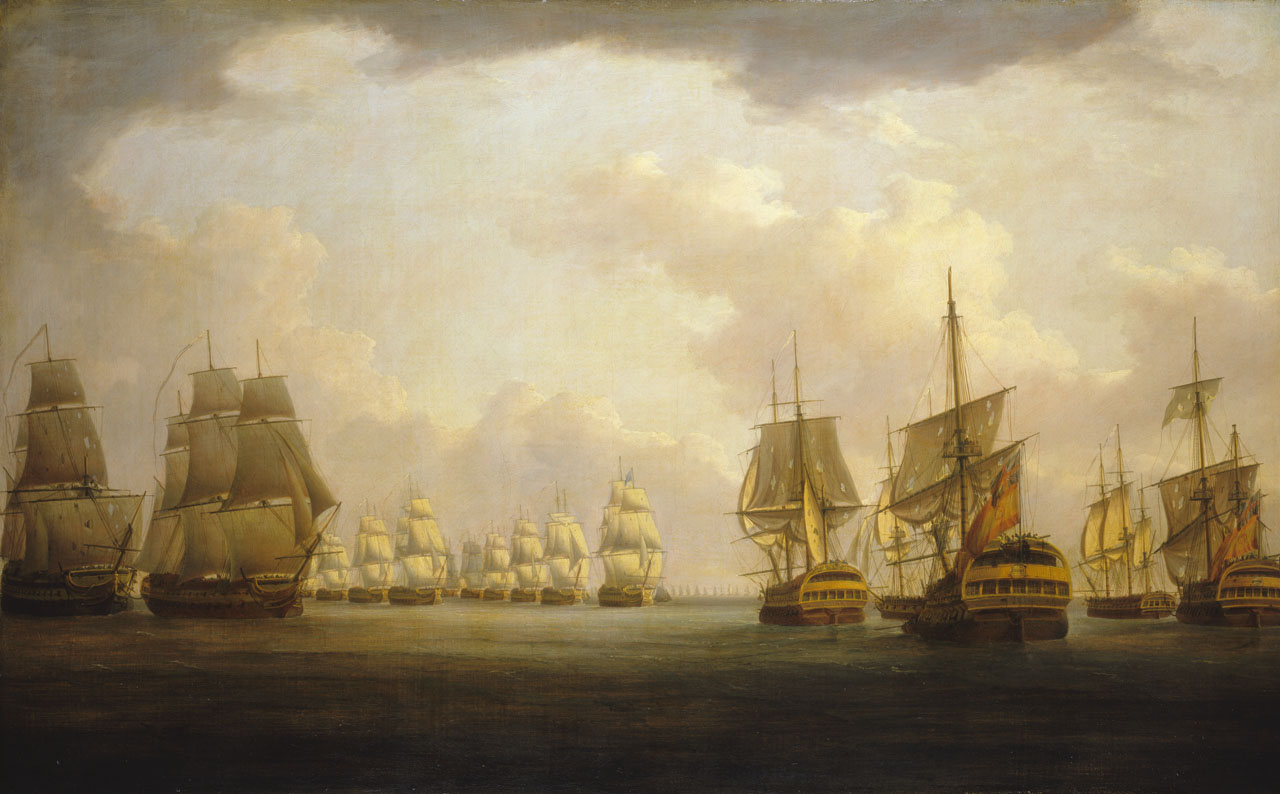
Day after the action – British frigates have two Spanish prizes, the Firme and the San Rafael under tow on the right. Painting by William Anderson

== Aftermath ==
Both sides claimed victory in the battle's aftermath. The British with more right as they had a numerically inferior force, losing no ships with losses of 41 killed and 162 wounded. The Franco-Spanish meanwhile had losses of 158 killed and 320 wounded with a further 800 ill. In addition the Spanish had lost two ships of the line, the Firme and the San Rafael which were captured in a battered state with over 1,200 personnel made prisoners. The French ships Atlas, Pluton and the Spanish España were also badly mauled. Calder was relieved of his command, court-martialled, and sentenced to be severely reprimanded for his failure to renew the battle on 23 and 24 July. He never served at sea again. Villeneuve failed to push on Brest, retired to refit at Vigo, then slipped into Coruña, and on 15 August decided to make for Cadiz.

The withdrawal to Cadiz ruined all hopes of Napoleon to make an invasion and landing in England, thus Napoleon, frustrated by Villeneuve's lack of élan, was forced to abandon his plan of invading Britain. Instead, the Armée d'Angleterre, renamed the Grande Armée, left Boulogne on 27 August to counter the threat from Austria and Russia. A few weeks after the battle he wrote: "Gravina is all genius and decision in combat. If Villeneuve had had those qualities, the battle of Finisterre would have been a complete victory."

Villeneuve and the combined fleets remained at Cádiz until they came out to their destruction at the Battle of Trafalgar on 21 October.

"If Admiral Villeneuve, instead of entering Ferrol, had contented himself with rallying at the Spanish squadron, and had sailed for Brest to join Admiral Gantheaume, my army would have landed; it would have been all over with England."

— General Napoleon Bonaparte, 8th Sept, 1815.

The two captured Spanish ships of the line Firme and San Rafael were taken into Plymouth. Whilst there they were turned into prison hulks.

== Order of battle ==
=== British fleet ===
- Calder had fifteen ships of the line (Prince of Wales, Glory, Barfleur, Windsor Castle, Malta, Thunderer, Hero, Repulse, Defiance, Ajax, Warrior, Dragon, Triumph, Agamemnon, and Raisonnable), two frigates (Egyptienne and Sirius), and two smaller vessels.

Ship	Casualties		Damage		
Ship	Dead	Wounded	Rigging	Masts and spars	Hull and others
Hero (74), Capt. Alan Gardner	1	4	Much torn	Foremast and fore spars seriously damaged	Several shots in flotation line
Ajax (74), Capt. William Brown	2	16	Much torn	Topsail spar	A cannon blasted causing battery damages
Triumph (74), Capt. Henry Inman	5	6	Much torn	Topsail spar	Two dismounted cannons
Barfleur (98), Capt. George Martin	3	7	Foremast and fore spar		
Agamemnon (64), Capt. John Harvey	0	3	Fore spar, mizzen mast and main spar		
Windsor Castle (98), Capt. Courtenay Boyle	10	35	Much torn	Fore spar and most of foremast, main mast, main spar, foremast and bowsprit	
Defiance (74), Capt. Philip Durham	1	7	Much torn	Spar of top mizzen sail, main mast, spar of foremast	
Prince of Wales (98), Flagship of Adm. Calder, Capt. William Cuming	3	20	Much torn	Spar of foremast, spar of top mizzen mast and spar of main mast	Rudder completely ripped off
Repulse (64), Capt. the Honourable Arthur Kaye Legge	0	4	Much torn	Bowsprit	
Raisonnable (64), Capt. Josias Rowley	1	1	Several spars	Some encrusted bullets	
Dragon (74), Capt. Edward Griffith	0	4			
Glory (98), Flagship of Rear-Adm. Sir Charles Stirling, Capt. Samuel Warren	1	1	Much torn	Spar of foremast	
Warrior (74), Capt. Samuel Hood Linzee	0	0	Much torn	Some spars	Shored starboard
Thunderer (74), Capt. William Lechmere	7	11	Much torn	Mizzen mast, and spars of fore and main masts	Several encrusted shots
Malta (80), Capt. Edward Buller	5	40	Much torn	Larger spars, and all masts	
Egyptienne (40), Capt. Hon. Charles Fleeming					
Sirius (36), Capt. William Prowse					
Nile (lugger), Lieut. John Fennell					
Frisk (cutter), Lieut. James Nicholson					

=== Franco-Spanish fleet ===
- Villeneuve had twenty ships of the line (six Spanish: Argonauta, Terrible, América, España, San Rafael, Firme; fourteen French: Pluton, Mont Blanc, Atlas, Berwick, Neptune, Bucentaure, Formidable, Intrépide, Scipion, Swiftsure, Indomptable, Aigle, Achille, and Algésiras) with seven frigates, and two brigs, one of which was Furet.

(according to Juan Ramón Viana Villavicencio)

Ship	Fleet	Casualties		Damage		
Ship	Fleet	Dead	Wounded	Rigging	Masts and spars	Hull and others
Argonauta (80), Flagship of Lieutenant-General Federico Gravina, Flag-Captain Rafael de Hore	Spain	6	5	Mizzen and fore masts knocked down	Cutwater torn down	
Terrible (74), Commander Francisco Vázquez de Mondragón	Spain	1	7	Much torn	Two cannons dismounted, slide ripped off, one shot flotation high	
América (64), Comm. Juan Darrac	Spain	5	13	All masts bullet-riddled	60 shots	
España (64), Comm. Bernardo Muñoz	Spain	5	23	Much torn	Mizzen mast down, several spars	Rudder partly obliterated, some damage in hull
San Rafael (80), Comm. Francisco de Montes (captured)	Spain	41	97	All torn	Utterly dismantled	Bullet riddled
Firme (74), Comm. Rafael de Villavicencio (captured)	Spain	35	60	All torn	Fully dismantled	Shot riddled
Pluton (74), Comm. Cosmao-Kerjulien	(France)	14	24			
Mont Blanc (74), Comm. Guillaume-Jean-Noël de Lavillegris (DOW)	(France)	5	16			
Atlas (74), Comm. Pierre-Nicolas Rolland	(France)	15	52	Captain Rolland wounded		
Berwick (74), Comm. Jean-Gilles Filhol de Camas	(France)	3	11			
Neptune (80), Comm. Esprit-Tranquille Maistral	(France)	3	9			
Bucentaure (80), Flagship of Adm. Villeneuve, Comm. Jean-Jacques Magendie	(France)	5	5			
Formidable (80), Flagship of Counter-admiral Pierre Dumanoir le Pelley, Comm. Letellier	(France)	6	8			
Intrépide (74), Comm. Louis-Antoine-Cyprien Infernet	(France)	7	9			
Scipion (74), Comm. Charles Berrenger	(France)	0	0			
Swiftsure (74), Comm. Charles-Eusèbe Lhospitalier de la Villemadrin	(France)	0	0			
Indomptable (80), Comm. Jean Joseph Hubert	(France)	1	1			
Aigle (74), Comm. Pierre-Paulin Gourrège	(France)	6	0			
Achille (74), Comm. Louis-Gabriel Deniéport	(France)	0	0			
Algésiras (74), Flagship of Counter-admiral Charles René Magon de Médine, Comm. Gabriel-Auguste Brouard	(France)	0	0			
Cornélie (44),	(France)					
Rhin (44), Comm. Michel-Jean-André Chesneau	(France)					
Didon (40), Comm. Pierre-Bernard Milius	(France)					
Hortense (40), Comm. Delamarre de Lamellerie	(France)					
Hermione (40), Comm. Jean-Michel Mahé	(France)					
Sirène (40),	(France)					
Thémis (40),	(France)					

== See also ==
- Ferrol Spanish Capital of the Maritime Department of the North (1788 AD).

== Notes ==
Preceded by Battle of Diamond Rock	Napoleonic Wars; Battle of Cape Finisterre (1805)	Succeeded by Battle of Wertingen
