= French frigate Thémis (1799) =

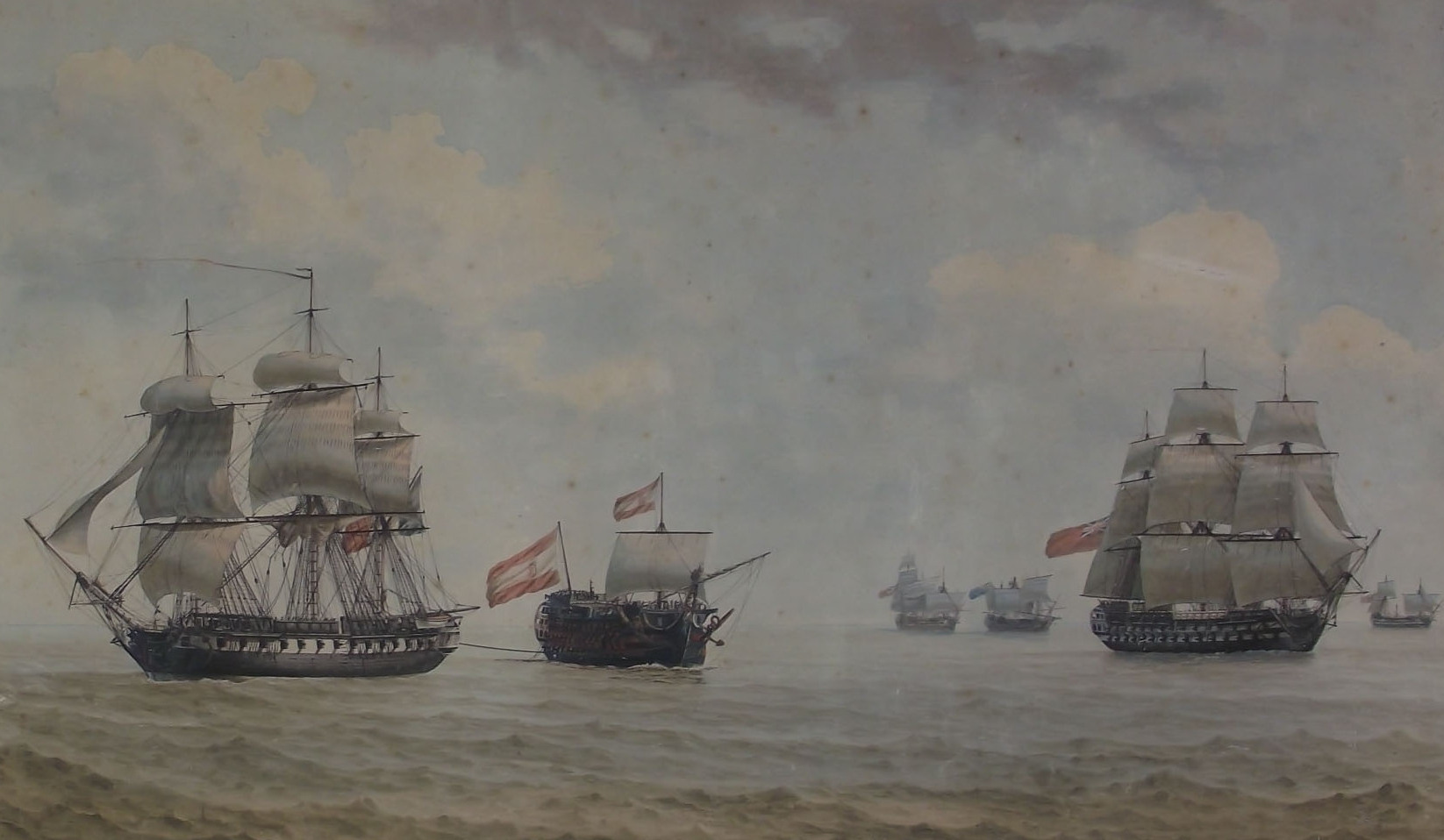
- Thémis with Santa Ana in tow in the aftermath of the Battle of Trafalgar.

History

France
- Name: Thémis
- Launched: 13 August 1799
- Fate: Broken up

General characteristics
- Class & type: Coquille-class frigate
- Displacement: 1,180 tonneaux
- Tons burthen: 590 port tonneaux; 898 bm
- Length: 42.8 m (140 ft)
- Beam: 11.4 m (37 ft)
- Draught: 5.3 m (17 ft)
- Depth of hold: 3.6 m (12 ft)
- Propulsion: Sails
- Sail plan: Ship
- Armament: 40 guns: 28 12-pounder long guns; 12 8-pounder long guns

Thémis was a 40-gun Coquille-class frigate of the French Navy.

== Service ==
Launched at Rochefort in 1799 and commissioned in 1801, she took part in the Battle of Cape Finisterre (22 July 1805) and in the Battle of Trafalgar (21 October 1805). During Trafalgar she was commanded by Captain Nicolas Joseph Pierre Jugan. After the battle she towed the Spanish ships of the line Principe de Asturias and Santa Ana to safety in Cádiz.

=== Lamellerie's expedition ===
Still under the command of Captain Jugan, on 26 February 1806 she took part in Lamellerie's expedition, a squadron commanded by the most senior frigate captain in Cádiz, Captain Louis-Charles-Auguste Delamarre de Lamellerie. The squadron's mission was to break out of Cádiz into the Atlantic and raid British merchant shipping. It consisted of other French frigates who had survived Trafalgar: Hermione, Hortense (Lamellerie's frigate), Rhin and the brig Furet (a slower ship she was captured by the British while the rest of the squadron escaped into the Atlantic).

Following the escape from Cádiz, the remaining four ships of the squadron sailed southwards, reaching the French African trading post of Senegal in March and then crossing the Atlantic to Cayenne, French Guiana arriving on 27 March. Taking on fresh supplies, the squadron sailed from Cayenne on 7 April and operated with limited success against British merchant shipping in the Caribbean Sea, including 15 days cruising off Barbados. Retiring to the Spanish colony of Puerto Rico, Lamellerie resupplied his ships again in preparation for the journey back to France. On 18 May the squadron sailed for home. During the six months expedition the squadron did not cause significant disruption to British trade. On 27 July, as they neared Rochefort, the squadron were spotted by a British ship of the line which chased the French squadron through the night and into the next morning, by which time the Rhin had fallen behind the others and was captured. The other ships became separated and Thémis was the only one to reach the intended destination of Rochefort (the other two frigates ended up in Bordeaux).

=== Mediterranean ===
In January 1808 Thémis was sailing in the Atlantic before returning to the Mediterranean. After passing by Gibraltar on 17 March, she raided commerce with the French frigate Pénélope and sailed to Toulon. From there, she was tasked to ferry supplies to Corfu, along with the Pauline. She was trapped there and eventually seized by the British when they captured the island.
