= HMS Moselle (1804) =

Brig-sloop of the Royal Navy

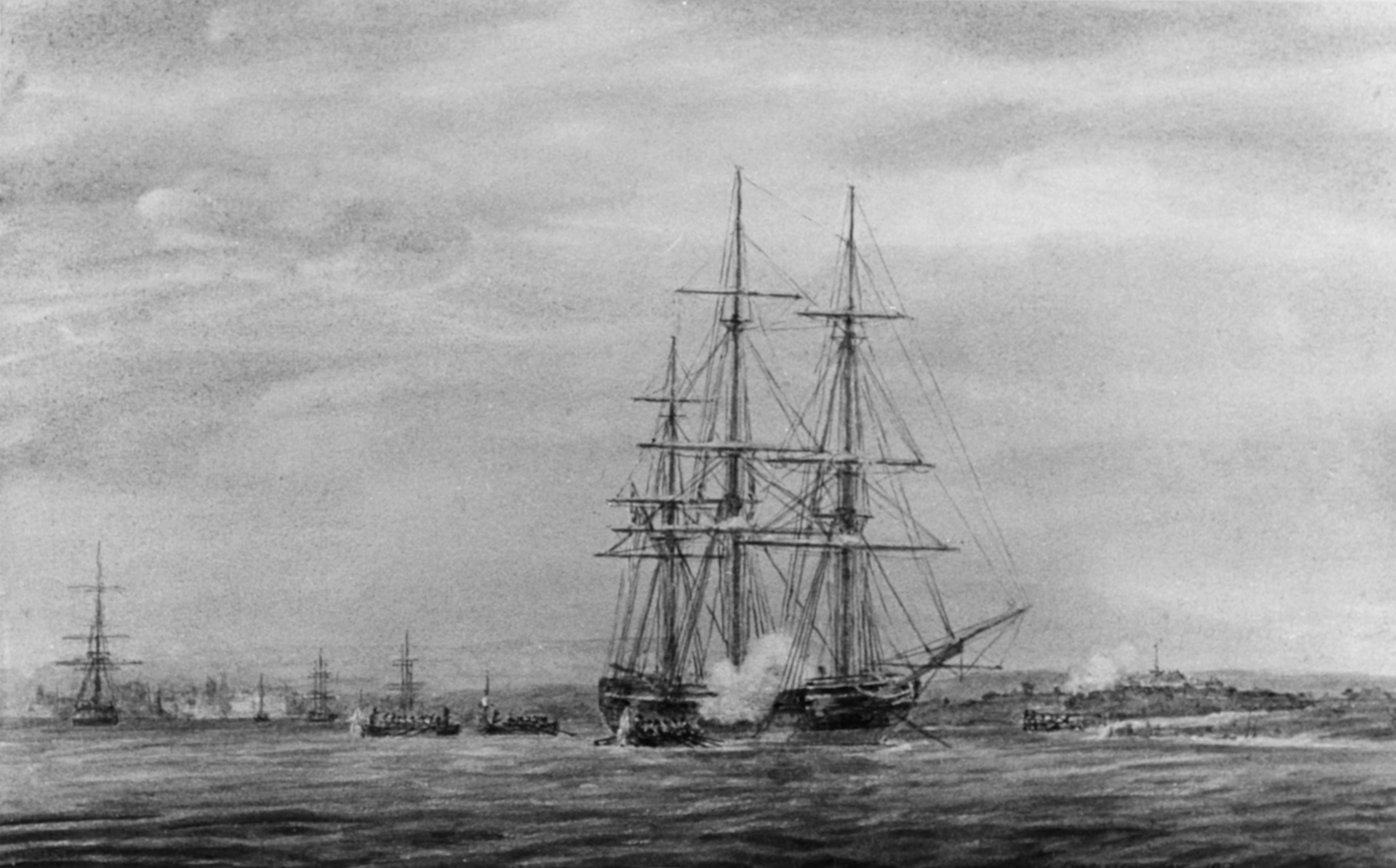
- HMS Moselle in Charleston Bay 1813 (Note: Or 1814. Sources differ.)

History

United Kingdom
- Name: HMS Moselle
- Ordered: 7 November 1803
- Builder: John King, Dover
- Laid down: March 1804
- Launched: October 1804
- Fate: Sold 1815

General characteristics
- Type: Cruizer-class brig-sloop
- Tons burthen: 385 (bm)
- Length: 100 ft 1 1/2 in (30.5 m) (gundeck); 77 ft 6 in (23.6 m) (keel)
- Beam: 30 ft 7 in (9.3 m)
- Depth of hold: 12 ft 9 in (3.9 m)
- Sail plan: Brig rigged
- Complement: 121
- Armament: 16 × 32-pounder carronades; 2 × 6-pounder bow guns

HMS Moselle was a Cruizer-class brig-sloop of the Royal Navy, launched in 1804. She served during the Napoleonic Wars in the Mediterranean, the Caribbean, and the North American station. She was sold in 1815.

== Career ==
Commander Robert Simpson commissioned her in December 1804 for the Downs. Commander John Surnam Carden replaced Simpson on 21 December 1804. Moselle shared with Penelope and Boadicea in the proceeds of the Jonge Obyna, Smidt, master, on 13 June. (Note: A seaman's share of a £1700 advance on the prize money was 16s 2½d.) That same day they also captured the Sophia. The final payment for Jonge Obyna and Sophia did not get paid out until June 1817. (Note: A first-class share was worth £104 3s 4d; a fifth-class share, that of a seaman, was worth 11s 10¼d.)

After Admiral Lord Nelson defeated the French and Spanish fleets at the battle of Trafalgar on 21 October, Moselle was at the blockade of Cadiz. On 25 November, Thunderer detained the Ragusan ship Nemesis, which was sailing from Isle de France to Leghorn, Italy, with a cargo of spice, indigo dye, and other goods. Moselle shared the prize money with ten other British warships.

In the aftermath of Trafalgar, four French frigates and the brig Furet took refuge at Cadiz, where they remained into February 1806. To try to lure them out, Vice-Admiral Cuthbert Collingwood pulled his ships-of-the-line ten leagues out to sea, leaving only the frigate Hydra, under the Captain George Mundy, and Moselle in close blockade. On 23 February a strong easterly wind drove the British off their station, which led the French commander, Captain Louis-Charles-Auguste Delamarre de Lamellerie, to seize the opportunity to escape. On the evening of 26 February Hydra and Moselle were three leagues west of the Cadiz lighthouse when they sighted the French vessels. Mundy began firing rockets and alarm guns to alert Collingwood, while sailing parallel to the escaping French squadron. Mundy then sent Carden in Moselle to try locate the British fleet. On the morning of 27 February Moselle reached Collingwood, who dispatched three frigates to try to catch the French. In the meantime, Hydra had managed to isolate the French brig from her companions, and after a two-hour chase, captured Furet. The French frigates did not come to their brig's aid, and after firing a pro forma broadside, Furet surrendered. Under the rules of prize-money, Moselle shared in the proceeds of the capture of Furet. During the next six months, Lamellerie's frigate squadron cruised the Atlantic, visiting Senegal, Cayenne and the West Indies, but failed significantly to disrupt British trade.

On 22 January 1806 Commander Alexander Gordon was appointed to replace Carden. However, on 30 January Carden was still in command when Moselle captured Hope, Webber, master, which was condemned as a prize at Gibraltar.

Later in 1806 Moselle was apparently in the Gulf of Mexico. Lieutenant J. Lamont was severely wounded while boarding an enemy vessel there.

Gordon sailed Moselle for the Mediterranean on 7 January 1807. She returned home by the end of 1807.

On 26 October 1807, Tsar Alexander I of Russia declared war on Great Britain. The official news did not arrive there until 2 December, at which time the British declared an embargo on all Russian vessels in British ports. Moselle was one of some 70 vessels that shared in the seizure of the 44-gun Russian frigate Speshnoy (Speshnyy), then in Portsmouth harbour. The British seized the Russian storeship Wilhelmina (Vilghemina) at the same time. The Russian vessels were carrying the payroll for Vice-Admiral Dmitry Senyavin’s squadron in the Mediterranean. (Note: A seaman on any one of the 70 British vessels received 14s 7½d in prize money.)

Moselle then sailed for Jamaica on 16 January 1808. In September Moselle recaptured the Ballahoo-class schooner Pike. At the end of 1808 Gordon was invalided home. His successor as captain of Moselle was Commander George Gustavus Lennock, who returned home in February.

Commander Henry Boyes (or Boys) assumed command during 1809. He was in command on 20 March when Moselle carried Brigadier-General Joseph French and his staff from Jamaica to St Domingo and brought General Carmichael back to Jamaica. (Note: General French was second in command of British forces in St Domingo. He became ill as a result of his exertions there and died two days after returning to Jamaica.) One payment of prize money occurred in October 1832. (Note: A first-class share was worth £67 3s 5d; a sixth-class share was worth £1 1s 3d.)

Next, Moselle captured the French navy schooner Beau Narcisse on 18 May 1809. Beau Narcisse had a crew of 55 men under the command of enseigne de vaisseau Luis Ores. She had left St Domingo on 7 May on a cruise.

When Lark foundered in a gale off Cape Causada (Point Palenqua), San Domingo, on 3 August, Moselle rescued three survivors.

On 18 June 1810, Moselle fired on the sloop USS Vixen off Barbados. Boys apologized to the Americans, reporting that he had been unable to make out her colours and that he thought she might be a French privateer that he was seeking. The Americans suffered one casualty, a man wounded in the mouth by a splinter.

Commander Charles Crackenthorp Askew replaced Boys on 26 November 1811, at Jamaica.

On 3 March 1812 Lieutenant James Stirling received temporary command of Moselle. Three months later her received promotion to the rank of Commander and moved to Brazen. Thereafter Moselle was under the command of Commander George Mowbray (or Moubray) on the North America station. He was appointed to command her 26 January 1812 and remained in command until 31 March 1813.

During the War of 1812 Moselle captured several American merchant vessels. First she captured the Anna, bound to Kingston with a cargo of cotton and cattle (24 August 1812). The second prize was the San Nicholas (19 September). Third came the Experiment, on 28 September. (Note: A first-class share was worth £140 3s 1¾d; a sixth-class share, that of an ordinary seaman, was worth £2 19s 9¼.) The ship Venus (14 October 1812), which was sailing from Philadelphia to Santiago de Cuba was next. Then she captured the schooner Magnolia (4 November), which was sailing from Rio de Janeiro to Havana. Next she captured the brig Osprey (30 December), which was sailing from Rio Grande to Havana. Moselle recaptured the brig Lord Wellington. (Note: The American privateer Sparrow had captured the brig Lord Wellington, Clephan, master, which had been sailing from Halifax to Jamaica. Moselle recaptured Lord Wellington, Cliphane, master, on 16 January 1813.) Moselle was among the 19 vessels that shared in the proceeds for the capture of the American ship Herman on 21 June. (Note: A first-class share was worth £47 13s 4d; a sixth-class share was worth 7s 6d.) Lastly, Moselle captured the American schooner Climax on 17 November 1813. (Note: A first-class share was worth £39 16s 7d; a sixth-class share was worth 11s 4¾d. Climax was armed with four 6-pounder guns and under the command of James Newman. Cranwell and Crane give the location as being off Havana. They also give the date of the capture as 6 April 1814, but this may refer to the date on which the Baltimore privateer Amelia recaptured Climax, which was renamed Mary.)

During this period, in October 1812, Commander Hutton Dawson replaced Mowbray, but Dawson died in February 1813. Dawson's replacement was Commander John Kinsman. Commander John Moberley replaced Kinsman in July.

Moselle returned to Britain in July. When she did so, she had as a passenger George Augustus Westphal, whose vessel, Anaconda, had just been condemned at Jamaica.

Moselle then returned to the American theatre. In 1814, acting Lieutenant Joseph Hyett was severely wounded in her boats in an action against a pirate schooner at Vera Cruz. Still, he led Moselle's boats in the capture of a 600-ton (bm) U.S. merchantman near the fort in Charleston Bay.

Moselle then served in the Chesapeake Bay. She arrived near New Orleans on 11 January 1815, accompanying fifteen transports, ferrying the 40th Foot, a siege train of 26 artillery pieces, and stores. At New Orleans Hyett suffered from frostbite that led to the amputation of his right leg.

On 9 March 1815 the US privateer Kemp, Captain Joseph Almeda, captured the British merchantman Ottawa, James Simpson, master, which was off Cuba while sailing from Liverpool to Jamaica with porter, soap, potatoes, hams, cheese, etc. On 3 April HMS Anaconda and Moselle, recaptured Ottawa. The London merchant James Strachan Glennie protested the recapture, acting on behalf of Kemp and Joseph Almeda, arguing that the recapture had occurred during the period the Treaty of Ghent had established for restitution of captures. The Vice admiralty court of Jamaica found for Glennie.

== Fate ==
On 22 November 1815, the navy offered Moselle for sale at Deptford. The navy sold Moselle on 14 December 1815 for £850.
