= Lamellerie's expedition =

1806 French naval operation

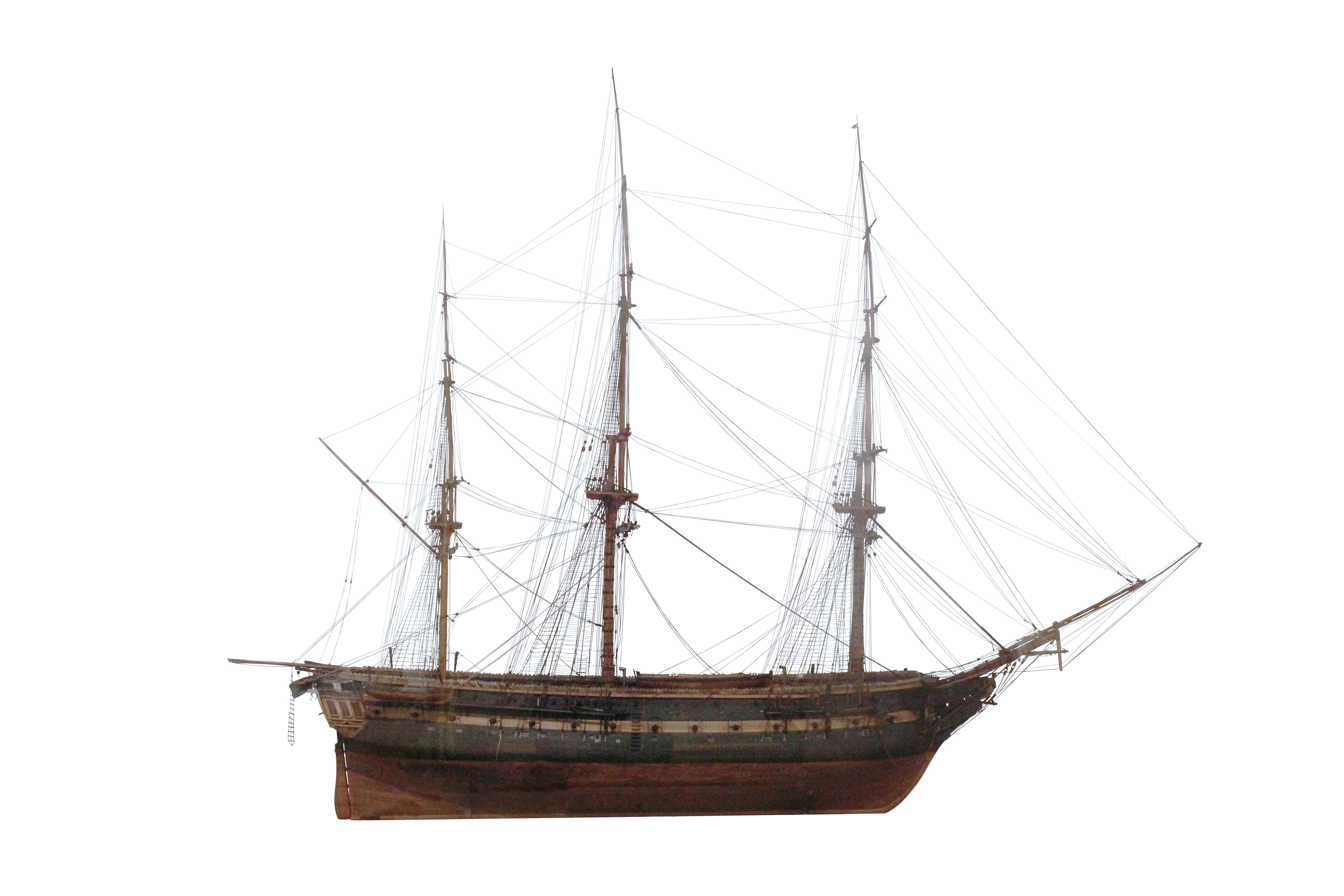
A model of Hortense, the flagship of the expedition

Lamellerie's expedition was a French naval operation launched in February 1806. Four French Navy frigates and a brig, all survivors of the Battle of Trafalgar in October 1805, attempted to break past the British blockade of Cádiz on 23 February 1806, taking advantage of the withdrawal of the principal blockade squadron several months earlier at the start of the Atlantic campaign of 1806. Although the squadron was intercepted by elements of the British blockade force, Captain Louis-Charles-Auguste Delamarre de Lamellerie escaped with the four frigates by abandoning the slower brig, which was captured. During the next six months, Lamellerie's squadron cruised the Atlantic, visiting Senegal, Cayenne and the West Indies but failing to cause any significant disruption to British trade.

On 27 July, as the squadron neared Rochefort, it was spotted by HMS Mars, a Royal Navy ship of the line stationed off the port to intercept French ships entering or leaving. Signalling to the rest of the British squadron, Captain Robert Dudley Oliver took Mars in pursuit, chasing the French squadron all through the night and into the next morning, by which time the frigate Rhin had fallen far behind the others. Recognising that Rhin was in danger of being captured, Lamellerie turned back to her defence with his main squadron but then changed his mind, turning once more and retreating to Rochefort as Oliver took possession of the heavily outgunned Rhin.

== Background ==
The Battle of San Domingo, the last major naval engagement of the Napoleonic Wars fought in open water

On 21 October 1805, the French and Spanish allied fleet was almost destroyed at the Battle of Trafalgar by a Royal Navy fleet under Vice-Admiral Lord Nelson. Among the scattered survivors of the Allied fleet were five French frigates, untouched during the action. With the rest of the surviving ships, the frigates anchored in Cádiz during the week that followed the battle and remained there for the rest of the year, contained in the harbour by a large British blockade squadron led by Vice-Admiral Sir John Thomas Duckworth. In December 1805 however, Duckworth abandoned the station in search of a French squadron under Vice-Admiral Zacharie Allemand that was raiding British convoys off the Savage Islands. Although Allemand escaped Duckworth, the British admiral became embroiled in the Atlantic campaign of 1806 and did not return to Cádiz, eventually sailing to the Caribbean where he won the Battle of San Domingo on 6 February 1806. In his absence, Duckworth's squadron was replaced at Cádiz by ships grudgingly despatched from the Mediterranean Fleet, under the command of Vice-Admiral Lord Collingwood.

The French Navy was concerned about its ships trapped in Cádiz and sought to bring them back to French harbours, particularly to make up for the heavy losses suffered in the Trafalgar Campaign. Therefore, four frigates and a brig were prepared for sea under the most senior frigate captain, Captain Louis-Charles-Auguste Delamarre de Lamellerie of Hortense. These ships were to break out of Cádiz, conduct a six-month raiding mission in the Atlantic to distract attention from the ongoing Atlantic campaign, and raid British merchant shipping. At the conclusion of the six months, Lamellerie was to return to Rochefort to join the French Atlantic Fleet.

== Breakout ==
Word of Lamellerie's preparations reached Collingwood, and he planned a ruse to lure the French frigate squadron out into open water. Withdrawing all the large vessels of the blockade squadron, Collingwood kept only the 36-gun frigate HMS Hydra and the 18-gun sloop HMS Moselle in position to create the impression that the principal blockading force had been driven off. This it was hoped would draw Lamellerie into an attack on the lone ships that would allow the rest of Collingwood's squadron, hidden just beyond the horizon, to counterattack and annihilate the French squadron. However, on 23 February a strong westerly wind blew up and the main squadron, Hydra and Moselle were all blown too far to the east. This was spotted by lookouts on shore and Lamellerie took the opportunity to leave port on 26 February, while the British ships were still out of position.

Lamellerie's squadron was spotted late on 26 February by lookouts on Hydra and Captain George Mundy, supported by Captain John Surman Carden on Moselle, steered a parallel course in the hope of cutting off their advance. At 23:00, Carden was detached to look for Collingwood and inform him of the location and direction of the French while Mundy continued to follow the enemy squadron. Although Hydra was now isolated and hopelessly outnumbered, Lamellerie made no effort to attack the British ship: he even failed to respond when the brig Furet, falling behind the larger and faster frigates, came within range of Hydra. Mundy opened fire at 04:30, Lieutenant Dumay on Furet acknowledging that he was hopelessly outgunned and completely unsupported by immediately striking his colours. As Collingwood's squadron was nowhere within sight and the French were rapidly pulling ahead, Mundy abandoned the chase, secured his prize and turned back eastwards as the French continued into the Atlantic. It is not known why Lamellerie fled from such an inferior force and allowed one of his ships to be captured without opposition: modern historian Richard Woodman describes his conduct as "astonishing, given the weakness of the opposition and [the strength of his] own combined force", but in a separate work suggests that Lamellerie's orders precluded any engagement until his force was safely off the coast.

== Operations in the Atlantic ==
Following the escape from Cádiz, the remaining four ships of Lamellerie's squadron sailed southwards, reaching the French African trading post of Senegal in March and then crossing the Atlantic to Cayenne, arriving on 27 March. Taking on fresh supplies, the squadron sailed from Cayenne on 7 April and operated with limited success against British merchant shipping in the Caribbean Sea, including 15 days cruising off Barbados. Retiring to the Spanish colony of Puerto Rico, Lamellerie resupplied his ships again in preparation for the journey back to France. The frigate squadron sailed on 18 May, leaving the Caribbean just as a large French squadron under Vice-Admiral Jean-Baptiste Willaumez arrived.

=== Capture of Rhin ===
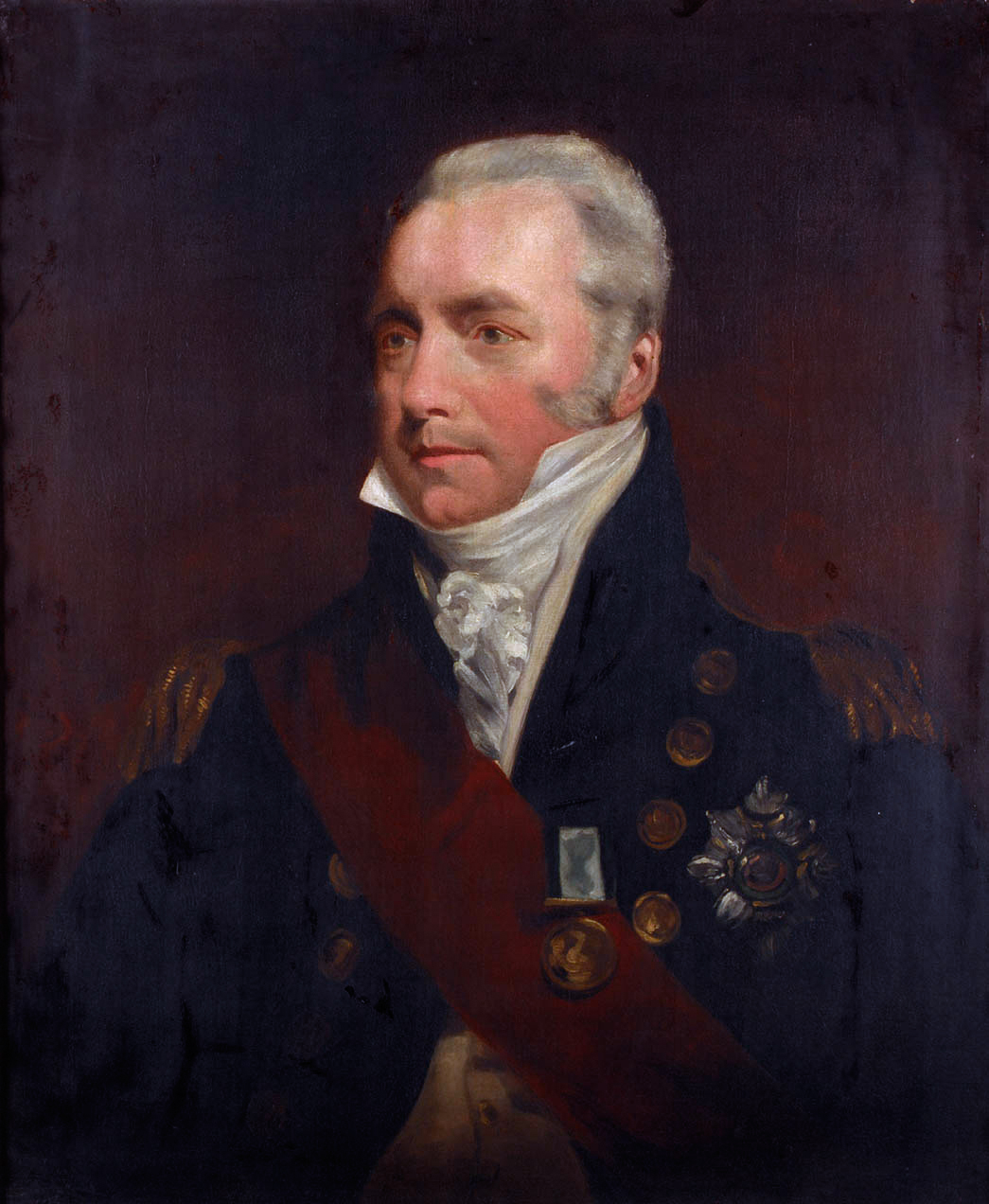
An 1817 portrait of Richard Goodwin Keats

The journey back to France was largely uneventful, Lamellerie crossing the Atlantic during May, June and July without meeting any Royal Navy vessels. At 18:00 on 27 July however, at 47°00′N 07°00′W in the Bay of Biscay, the frigates were spotted by lookouts on the British ship of the line HMS Mars. Mars was a large and powerful ship, a veteran of Trafalgar that was operating as a scout for the squadron under Commodore Richard Goodwin Keats, detailed to blockade the French Atlantic port of Rochefort. Immediately giving chase, Captain Robert Dudley Oliver signaled from Mars to the nearest British ship HMS Africa, warning of the position and direction of the French. Africa passed this information on to Keats while Mars set all sail in pursuit of Lamellerie.

Running before the more powerful ship under all possible sail, the four French frigates gradually became separated from one another in the dark. Mars too was alone, Dudley easily outrunning the rest of his squadron but unable to catch the leading French ships. When dawn rose on 28 July, it was clear that Hortense and the other leading vessels were stretching the distance between themselves and Mars but that the rearmost French ship, the frigate Rhin was struggling to keep up. Realising that he was gaining on Rhin, Oliver continued pushing his ship forward and Lamellerie, recognising the danger to his rearmost frigate, turned his squadron about and bore down on the isolated ship of the line. Although Mars was far larger than any of the individual frigates, together they carried more guns and could have made an effective defence if handled efficiently. Determined to engage the French, Oliver continued to sail towards Lamellerie and at 15:00 the French captain suddenly reversed his direction and fled eastwards with his three faster ships, abandoning Rhin to Oliver.

By the time Lamellerie had turned away, the chase had traveled over 150 nautical miles (280 km) from its original position and Rhin could no longer hold off the British ship. A fierce rain squall caused the frigate to roll and Oliver maintained the pursuit so that at 18:00 he was close enough to fire a single shot at Rhin, a warning of that a full broadside was to follow. Aware that his ship could not hope to withstand an attack from the ship of the line, Captain Michel Chesneau hauled down his flag and surrendered without a fight. Although the rest of Lamellerie's ships were still within sight, the approaching night, increasingly stormy weather and the large number of prisoners of war to be transferred from the prize persuaded Oliver to give up any further pursuit. Lamellerie steered his remaining squadron along the coast, where it split up during the night. The following day Hortense and Hermione entered Bordeaux while Thémis was the only one of the squadron to reach its intended destination of Rochefort. Oliver secured his prize, but was so far from his station that he did not manage to rejoin Keats' squadron until 31 July.

== Aftermath ==
Rhin and the prisoners were taken to Britain, where the frigate was immediately fitted out as a Royal Navy ship under her old name as HMS Rhin. Oliver was commended for his perseverance and he and his men shared in the prize money from the frigate. In France, there appears to have been no condemnation of Lamellerie's repeated failure to engage Royal Navy forces that in terms of weight of shot at least were the inferior of his squadron. In his official report he inaccurately claimed that his frigates had all been too badly damaged during the Atlantic cruise to consider fighting a ship of the line. He was later made a peer after the return of the French monarchy and remained in the French Navy for many years. In British histories his actions have been roundly condemned – William James accuses him of lying in his official despatches and wrote in 1827: "What, then, but a misrepresentation of the facts could have saved this French commodore from being cashiered?", while Richard Woodman wrote in 1998 that "such apparent pusillanimity fed stories of British superiority against all odds and tended to breed a dangerous conceit".

== Order of battle ==
Commodore La-Marre-la-Meillerie's squadron
Ship	Guns	Commander	Notes
Hortense	40	Commodore Louis-Charles-Auguste Delamarre de Lamellerie	Returned to Bordeaux on 28 July.
Rhin	40	Captain Michel-Jean-André Chesneau	Captured on 28 July by HMS Mars.
Hermione	40	Captain Jean-Michel Mahé	Returned to Bordeaux on 28 July.
Thémis	36	Commodore Nicolas-Joseph-Pierre Jugan	Returned to Rochefort on 28 July.
Furet	18	Lieutenant Pierre-Antoine-Toussaint Dumay	Captured on 26 February by HMS Hydra.
Source: James, p. 253, Clowes, p. 387

== Bibliography ==
- Clowes, William Laird (1997) [1900]. The Royal Navy, A History from the Earliest Times to 1900, Volume V. Chatham Publishing. ISBN 1-86176-014-0.
- Gardiner, Robert, ed. (2001) [1998]. The Victory of Seapower. Caxton Editions. ISBN 1-84067-359-1.
- James, William (2002) [1827]. The Naval History of Great Britain, Volume 4, 1805–1807. Conway Maritime Press. ISBN 0-85177-908-5.
- Woodman, Richard (2001). The Sea Warriors. Constable Publishers. ISBN 1-84119-183-3.
