= Spanish ship Principe de Asturias (1794) =

Naval ship of the line sunk in 1814

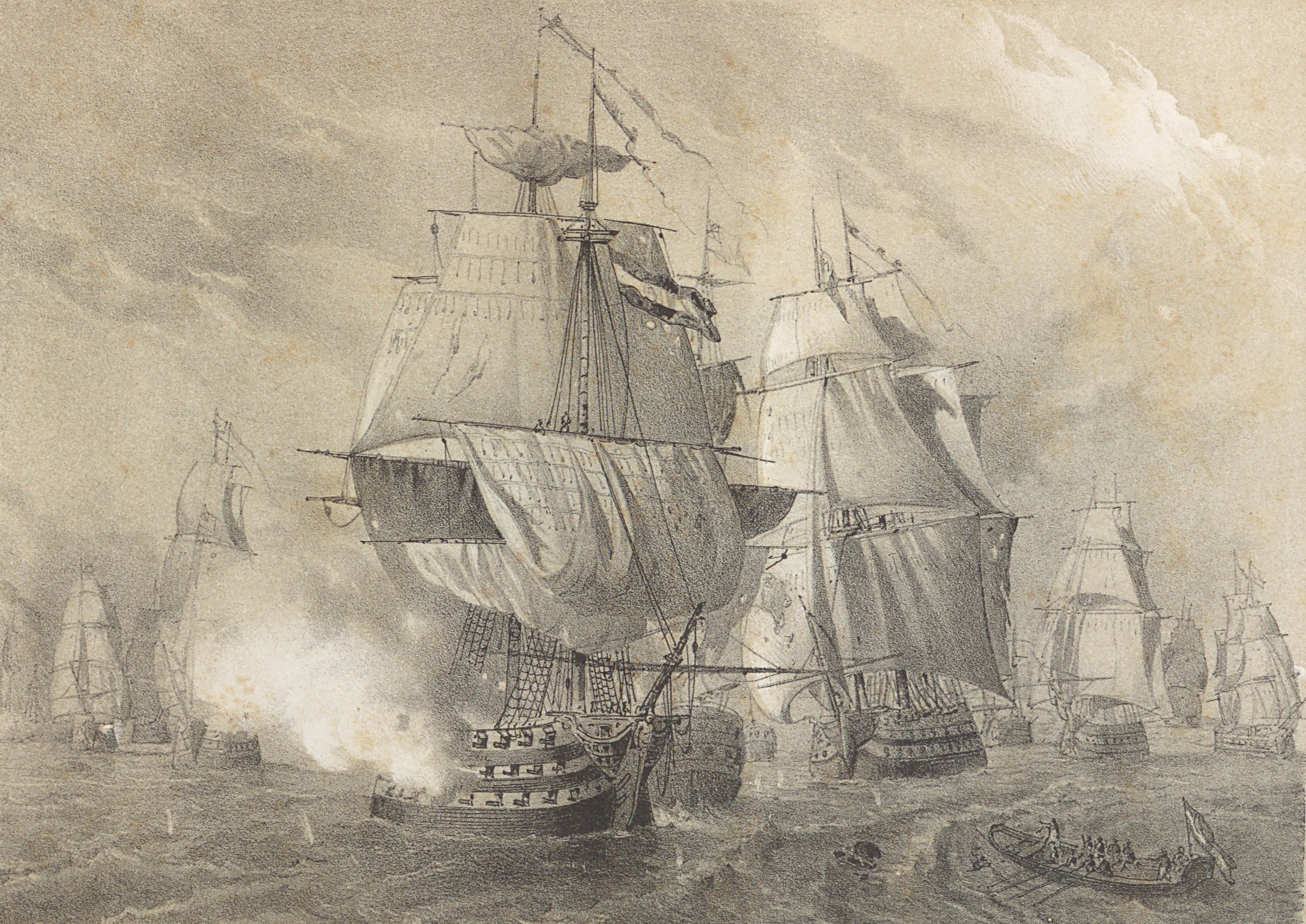
- Príncipe de Asturias (centre) during the Battle of Trafalgar

History

Spain
- Name: Príncipe de Asturias
- Builder: Real Astillero de La Habana, Havana
- Launched: 28 January 1794
- Stricken: 1817
- Fate: Foundered in 1814; Remains ordered to be taken to pieces on 12 September 1820

General characteristics
- Class & type: Santa Ana-class ship of the line
- Tonnage: 2,453 1/2 tons
- Length: 58.506 m (191 ft 11.4 in)
- Beam: 16.16 m (53 ft 0 in)
- Draught: 7.37 m (24 ft 2 in)
- Depth of hold: 7.54 m (24 ft 9 in)
- Sail plan: Full-rigged ship
- Complement: At the Battle of Trafalgar, 1,141; Capture of the Rosily Squadron, 1,036
- Armament: On launch: 30 × 36-pounder cannon; 32 × 24-pounder cannon; 32 × 12-pounder cannon; 18 × 8-pounder cannon; At Trafalgar: 30 × 36-pounder cannon; 32 × 24-pounder cannon; 30 × 12-pounder cannon; 6 × 8-pounder cannon; 14 × 48-pounder obuses (howitzers); 6 × 24-pounder obuses (howitzers)
- Armour: None

Príncipe de Asturias was a 112-gun ship of the line of the Spanish Navy named after Ferdinand, eldest surviving son of Charles IV of Spain and heir apparent with the title Prince of Asturias. She served during the Napoleonic Wars escorting convoys, and fought at different times against both the British and French navies. Her invocation name was Los Santos Reyes (the Holy Kings).

== Construction ==
She was built in Havana, Cuba in 1794 as part of the Santa Ana class designed by José Romero y Fernández de Landa. She was the last built of the eight ships of this class and was launched on 28 January 1794. Her construction was overseen by Honorato Bouyón.

== Service ==
She left Havana on 26 February 1795 under the command of Brigadier Adrián de Valcárcel, and arrived in Cádiz on 17 May 1795 after escorting a valuable convoy.

=== Cape St Vincent ===
In 1797 she was commanded by Brigadier Antonio de Escaño y García, and was part of a squadron under Teniente General José de Córdova to escort another convoy. After completing that mission, but before reaching Cádiz, the squadron was surprised by a sudden storm which blew them further out to sea. While making their way back they encountered and were defeated by a British squadron on 14 February 1797 at the Battle of Cape St Vincent. The Príncipe de Asturias had 10 killed and 19 wounded, and helped save the Spanish flagship Santísima Trinidad from being captured by the British.

=== Trafalgar ===
At the Battle of Trafalgar, she was part of the Franco-Spanish fleet and the flagship of Spanish Teniente General Federico Gravina, with Antonio de Escaño as his deputy and Brigadier Rafael Hore as the ship's captain. During the battle Gravina found himself attacked by three British ships. The main mast and mizzen were shot through, rigging and sails shot to pieces. Gravina's left arm was shattered by grapeshot (he died a year later from wounds he received during the battle), and seeing a looming defeat, he managed to gather ten ships around the Príncipe de Asturias which suffered 50 killed and 110 wounded. After the battle, the ship had to be towed by the French frigate Thémis and underwent major repairs in Cádiz.

=== War with France ===
After the French invasion of Spain in 1808, she then served during the Peninsular War. She was the flagship of Juan Ruiz de Apodaca during the capture of the Rosily Squadron of the French ships of the line Neptune, Algesiras, Argonaute, Héros, Plutón and the frigate Cornélie. In September 1810 she and the Santa Ana crossed the Atlantic to Havana to avoid capture by the French. She struck a rock and foundered in 1814, and her hull was ordered to be broken up in September 1820, although the remains were still visible off Havana in 1834.

== Bibliography ==
- Adkin, Mark (2005). The Trafalgar Companion: A Guide to History's Most Famous Sea Battle and the Life of Admiral Lord Nelson. Aurum. ISBN 1-84513-018-9.
- Adkins, Roy (2004). Trafalgar: The Biography of a Battle. Little, Brown. ISBN 0-316-72511-0.
- Clayton, Tim & Craig, Phil (2004). Trafalgar: The Men, the Battle, the Storm. Hodder & Stoughton. ISBN 0-340-83026-3.
- Fremont-Barnes, Gregory (2005). Trafalgar 1805: Nelson's Crowning Victory. Campaign. Vol. 157. Osprey Publishing. ISBN 1-84176-892-8.
- Goodwin, Peter (2005). The Ships of Trafalgar: The British, French and Spanish Fleets October 1805. Naval Institute Press. ISBN 1-59114-824-3.
- Winfield, Rif; Tredrea, John M; García-Torralba Pérez, Enrique & Blasco Felip, Manuel (2023). Spanish Warships in the Age of Sail 1700—1860: Design, Construction, Careers and Fates. Barnsley, UK: Seaforth Publishing. ISBN 978-1-5267-9078-1.
