= Shah Ardaseer (1786 ship) =

History

Great Britain
- Name: Shah Ardaseer
- Builder: Bombay Dockyard
- Launched: c.1786
- Fate: Burnt 13 September 1809

General characteristics
- Tons burthen: 86013/94, or 868, or 900 (bm)
- Armament: 2 × 9-pounder guns + 22 × 12-pounder guns "Of the New Construction"
- Notes: Three decks; teak built

Great Britain
- Name: HMS Arrogant
- Acquired: 7 August 1810
- Fate: Sold 1842

General characteristics
- Tons burthen: 1,439 (bm)

Shah Ardaseer was built at Bombay, probably in 1786 (see below). English transliterations of her name show her as Shah or Shaw + Adaseer, or Ardaseer, or Ardasier, or Adasier, or Ardasheer, or Ardeseer, or Ardesir. A fire on 13 September 1809 at Bombay burnt her. She then may have been recovered, repaired, and enlarged to become the hulk HMS Arrogant, which was moved to Trincomalee in 1822 and sold there in 1842.

== Career ==
Shah Ardaseer was built in Bombay in 1784, 1786, or 1787, or 1788; although there are more citations for 1787, it is not clear that they represent independent information. She was primarily a "country ship", that is, she primarily traded east of the Cape of Good Hope, thus not trespassing on the British East India Company's monopoly on the trade between Britain and the Far East.

Shaw Addesseer was among several vessels reported as arriving at Canton from Bombay in July 1789 and returning in December, under Captain Ramsay James Callander, formerly master of Sultan, then commanded her to China, departing Bombay 22 May 1790. Callander and his partner Collins had a trading business based in Calcutta, and for the following four years Callander commanded her voyages between Calcutta, Madras and other ports in the Bay of Bengal, carrying sundry goods but at least once troops.

Shaw Ardasier gained wider fame in 1793 when dramatic reports reached London of the killing by a tiger of a son of Sir Hector Munro of Novar, while the ship was lying off Saugur Island at the mouth of the Hooghly River. The Calcutta Gazette carried the story, but also reported that Shaw Ardasier had arrived at Madras on 4 January "after a quick and pleasant voyage".

A reference to Ardesier as being in Batavia in November 1793, returning from Botany Bay under Captain Bampton, probably confused her with Shah Hormuzeer, which Bampton navigated through Torres Strait in that year.

Callander of Shah Ardaseer was listed among the captains of a proposed China fleet in May 1794, but when the fleet eventually sailed in July her master was J. Nimmo. Callander instead took Eliza to Penang, but in August 1794 Revenge, a French privateer, captured her and sent her to Mauritius. In turn HMS Resistance captured Revenge; Callander returned to Madras on Resistance. Thereafter Callander was master of Betsey until accumulating debts forced him to flee Calcutta, and Betsey and its contents were auctioned.

In 1798 Shaw Ardasher's master was W[illiam] Dawson and her owner Dady Nasserwanjee.

Notwithstanding its status as a country ship, Shaw Ardasher did visit England. She entered the Registry of Great Britain on 31 August 1799. Ardaseer then appeared in Lloyd's Register (LR) in 1800 with Maughan, master, Adamson, owner, and trade London–India. (LR and the Register of Shipping carried this data unchanged into 1806.)

On 29 December 1799, Shaw Ardaseer, Smith, master, sailed from Gravesend, bound for India.

Lloyd's List reported on 30 May 1800 that Shaw Ardrasier had run down and sunk Westmoreland, Ayre, master. Westmoreland was on a voyage from Newcastle upon Tyne to Grenada. Her crew was saved.

The government in India, in preparation for sending an expedition to the Red Sea, engaged three country ships, Shaw Ardesir, Cumbrian, and Minerva, and commissioned them on terms that would permit them to share in prize money.

Shah Ardasheer then served as a transport to support General Sir David Baird's expedition to the Red Sea, which in turn had the objective of supporting General Sir Ralph Abercrombie at the battle of Alexandria.

In 1803 Shaw Ardeseer appeared in a list of vessels registered at Bombay. Her master was Thomas Maughan, and her owner Dady Nasserwanjee. She spent much of her time sailing between Bombay and Canton in the cotton trade.

On 10 January 1805 Ardaseer shoaled on a bank at 10°35′N 107°45′E.

== Fate ==
In September 1809 Shah Ardasheer was at Bombay loading a cargo for London. Her owners had arranged insurance of £124,440 for her and her cargo for the voyage. The insurance policy was completed on 27 December 1809. However, by that time she had already burnt at Bombay.

In the night of 13 September 1809 Shah Ardasheer caught fire. An alarm was raised and Mr. Kempt, the chief officer, hailed the warships around her for help. Captain Wainright of HMS Iphigenia, responded with 100 men, buckets, and an "engine". HMS Chiffonne and Teignmouth also sent men. Despite their efforts, Ardaseer could not be saved. Unable to stop the fire, the rescuers scuttled her in the harbour. Lloyd's List reported that she had burnt in Bombay Harbour and that half her cargo had been on board.

== HMS Arrogant ==
From 1804 to 1810, when she was broken up, HMS Arrogant had sat in Bombay harbour as a floating battery, receiving ship and then sheer hulk. The Admiralty ordered the purchase of the mercantile Ardaseir. Admiral Drury renamed the purchased vessel HMS Arrogant and decided to use her as a floating hospital.

There is no record of the construction at Bombay Dockyard of an Ardesir in 1810. This raises the possibility that Arrogant was Shah Ardasheer raised and rebuilt, which would also account for the increase in burthen.

HMS Arrogant was registered as a third rate in 1827. She was moved to Trincomalee on 19 November 1822. (She may have been hulked there earlier as she described in 1819 as a hulk there.) She was sold in 1842.
