= French schooner Vigie (1799) =

History

France
- Name: Vigie
- Builder: Louis Mathurin and Antoine Crucy, Nantes
- Cost: Fr.50,000
- Laid down: May 1799
- Launched: July 1799
- Fate: Wrecked 30 December 1810

General characteristics
- Class & type: Telegraph-class schooner
- Displacement: Unladen: 67 tons; Laden: 107 tons
- Tons burthen: 70 (French; "of load") (bm)
- Length: Overall:25.01 m (82 ft 1 in); Waterline:24.04 m (78 ft 10 in)
- Beam: 6.17 m (20 ft 3 in)
- Draught: 2.46 m (8 ft 1 in)
- Sail plan: Schooner
- Complement: 3 officers + 42–55 men
- Armament: Originally: 14 swivel guns; At Gorée: 2 × 3-pounder guns + 14 swivels; 1804: 6 × 4-pounder guns + 6 swivels

The French Navy's Telegraph-class schooner Vigie was launched at Nantes in July 1799 by Mathurin, Louis, and Antoine Crucy, building to plans by Pierre Ozanne. She was wrecked in December 1810.

== Career ==
On 14 July 1802 Vigie sailed from Lorient to Saint Pierre and Miquelon and back, in company with Surveillante. (The Treaty of Amiens of 1802 had returned the islands to France; Britain reoccupied them when hostilities recommenced the next year.)

In 1803 Vigie underwent refitting in Lorient.

In 1803 Vigie, under the command of lieutenant de vaisseau Jean-Michel Mahé, sailed from Cayenne at the head of a squadron consisting of herself and three privateer schooners. They were carrying troops to West Africa. They stopped at Dakar where more troops and two more vessels joined them, and then on 17 January 1804 recaptured Gorée. (The British recaptured Gorée some months later.)

Vigie again underwent refitting in Lorient in August 1804.

== Fate ==
Vigie foundered on 30 December 1810 after running on an uncharted rock off Pointe des Pilours, Sables d'Olonne, near Saint-Gilles-Croix-de-Vie; six 4-pounder bronze guns were recovered. She had been under the command of enseigne de vaisseau Bourrand.
