= French frigate Chiffonne =

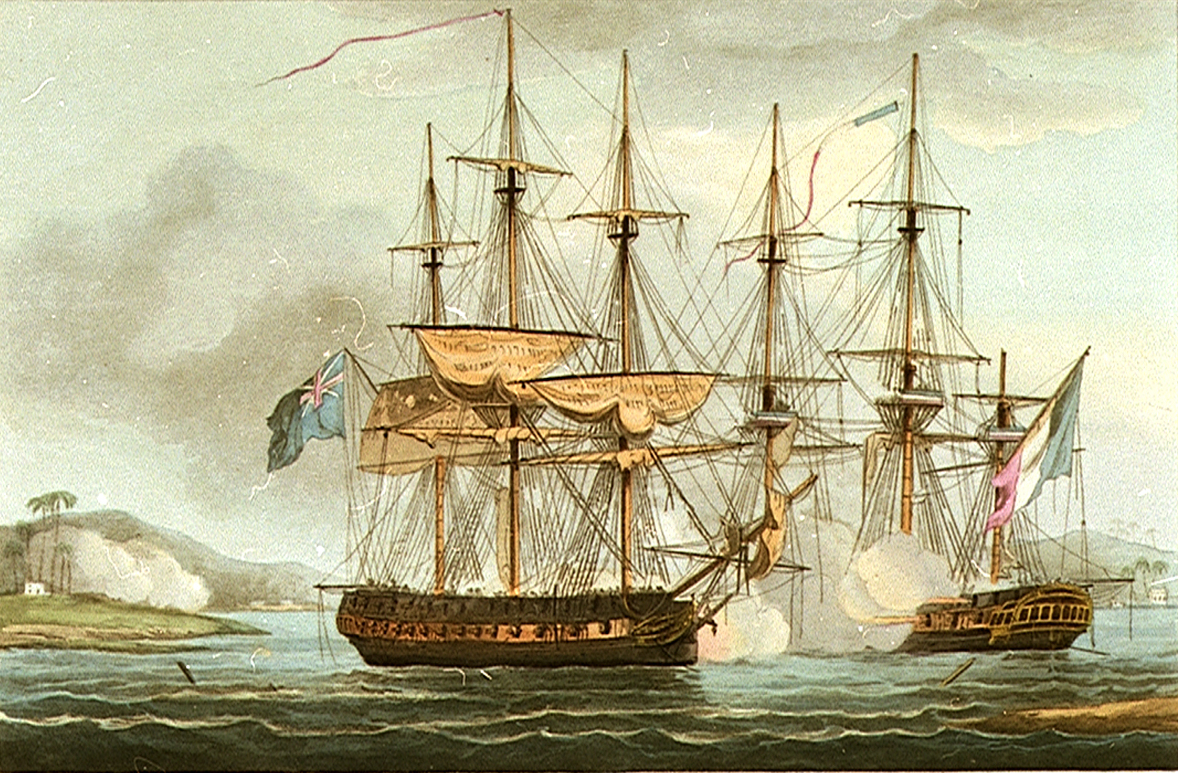
- HMS Sybille capturing Chiffonne (right)

History

France
- Name: Chiffonne
- Laid down: 10 November 1793
- Launched: 31 August 1799
- In service: December 1800
- Captured: 19 August 1801

United Kingdom
- Name: Chiffonne
- Acquired: 19 August 1801 by capture
- Fate: Broken up in September 1814

General characteristics
- Class & type: Heureuse-class frigate
- Displacement: 1,100 tonneaux
- Tons burthen: 600 port tonneaux; 92160/94 (bm)
- Length: 144 ft 1 in (43.92 m) (overall); 120 ft 6 1/4 in (36.735 m) (keel)
- Beam: 37 ft 11 in (11.56 m)
- Draught: 5.8 m (19 ft)
- Depth of hold: 12 ft 0 in (3.66 m)
- Propulsion: Sail
- Complement: 250 men
- Armament: French service: UD: 28 × 12-pounder guns; QD: 8 × 8-pounder guns and 4 × 36-pounder carronades; Fc: 4 × 8-pounder guns; British service: UD:26 × 12-pounder guns; QD: 9 × 9-pounder guns; Fc: 12 × 32-pounder carronades

Chiffonne was a 38-gun Heureuse-class frigate of the French Navy. She was built at Nantes and launched in 1799. The British Royal Navy captured her in 1801. In 1809 she participated in a campaign against pirates in the Persian Gulf. She was sold for breaking up in 1814.

== French service ==
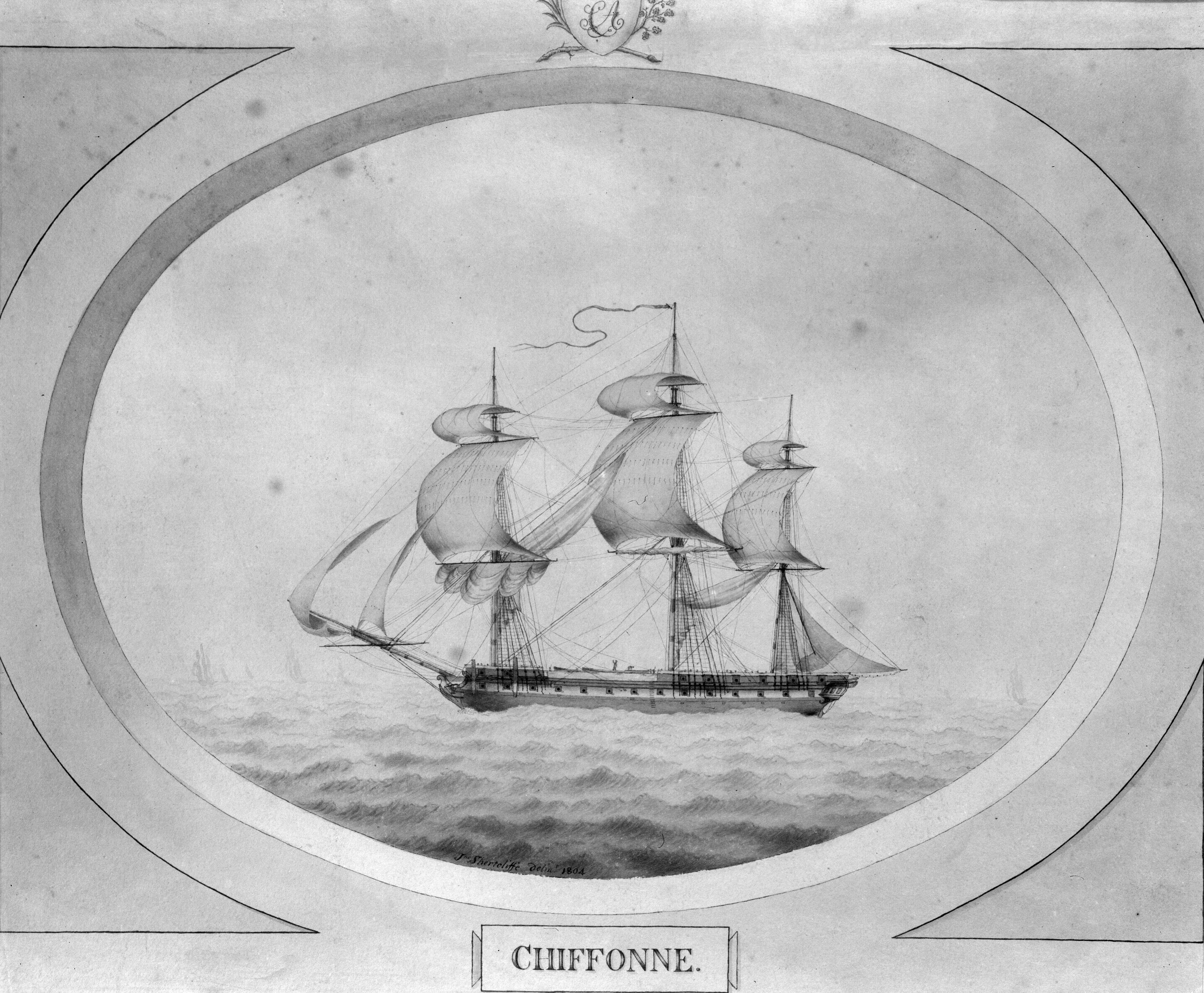
Chiffonne - The ship which Charles Adam took from the French at the Seychelles Islands

On 11 July 1801, Chiffonne, under the command of Captain Pierre Guiyesse arrived at Mahé, Seychelles from the port of St Nazaire with 33 deportees under sentence of exile from France. The exiles had been involved in the Plot of the Rue Saint-Nicaise against Napoleon.

On 15 May, off Brazil, she captured a Portuguese schooner. Three days later she captured the Brazilian frigate Hirondelle, armed en flute. Hirondelle (or possibly Andorhina) was armed with twenty-four 24-pounder carronades and put up a short fight. Guiyesse had her guns thrown overboard, took her stores (cables, spare rigging and sails), and then released her officers and crew under parole.

On 16 June, Chiffonne captured the East Indiaman Bellona on her way from Bengal to London. In taking Bellone, Chiffonne had her mizzen mast crippled. A prize crew under Ensign Jean-Michel Mahé took Bellona to Mauritius where she arrived a month later.

On 19 August HMS Sibylle, Captain Charles Adam, chased her off Mahé, Seychelles. At the time of the British attack Chiffonne was at anchor and aided her defense by constructing a battery using some of her forecastle guns and heating the shot. Her captain, Commander Guiyesse, attempted to avoid capture by beaching Chiffonne, but the British captured her the next day. She had lost 23 men killed and 30 wounded; Sybille lost two men killed and one wounded. She was brought into British service as HMS Chiffonne. When Adams arrived in Madras with his prize the insurance company there presented him with a sword worth guineas, while the merchants of Calcutta later too presented him with a sword and a piece of plate.

== British service ==
The British commissioned Chiffonne in 1802 in the East Indies under Captain Henry Stuart. In July 1802 she carried despatches to Calcutta with the reports of the murder of the Persian ambassador Haji Khalil Khan in Bombay. She returned to England and was fitted at Woolwich in 1803. Captain Charles Adam (late of Sibylle) took command of Chiffonne on 23 May 1803 and recommissioned her for service in the North Sea and the coast of Spain, where she served from 1803 to 1807.

On 5 August 1803 Chiffonne, Ethalion and Cruizer captured Flore. The same three vessels shared the salvage money arising from the recapture on the same day of Margaret, Robert Lacs, master.

The next day Chiffonne and Ethalion captured John, of Workington. Then on 20 June Chiffonne captured Zeeluft. In October Chiffonne was under the command of Captain Patrick Campbell, perhaps temporarily. In December, she ran aground off the coast of Norway and was severely damaged. Repairs were carried out at Sheerness.

On 10 June 1804, Chiffonne and consorts engaged French gunboats. Then on 20 June Chiffonne captured another Zeeluft, or at least a vessel by that name and with a different master than that of the previous year. Chiffonne was in company with Falcon, Clinker, Steady, and the hired armed cutter Frances.

On 10 June 1805, Chiffonne, with Falcon, Clinker, and Frances chased a French convoy for nine hours until it took shelter under the guns of Fécamp. The convoy consisted of two corvettes (Foudre under Capitaine de vaisseau Jacques-Felix-Emmanuel Hemelin, and Audacieuse, under Lieutenant Dominique Roquebert), four large gunvessels and eight others, and 14 transports. The British suffered some casualties from gunfire from shore batteries, with Chiffonne, which had borne the brunt of the firing, losing two men killed and three wounded.

In May 1806 Chiffonne was under the command of John Wainwright. On 14 June Chiffonne, which had returned to Portsmouth, sailed for Cádiz, carrying General Sir John Moore and Admiral Purvis, who had raised his flag on her. At Cádiz, Purvis transferred his flag to Minotaur and Chiffonne proceeded to Gibraltar. From there, on 5 July, she sailed to Messina in company with Active, Racehorse, and nineteen transports, supply vessels and merchant vessels, arriving on 7 August.

At some point in early 1807, boats from Chiffonne and Sabrina cut out a brig and a schooner under the guns of a 4-gun battery on the south coast of Spain.

She sailed for the East Indies in May 1808. About a year and a half later, on 13 September 1809, Chiffonne was in the port of Bombay when the ship Shah Ardaseer caught fire. Mr. Kempt, the chief officer, hailed the warships around her for help, and Wainright responded with 100 men, buckets, and an "engine". Despite their efforts, those of the crew, and those of men from the other British warships in the port, Ardaseer could not be saved.

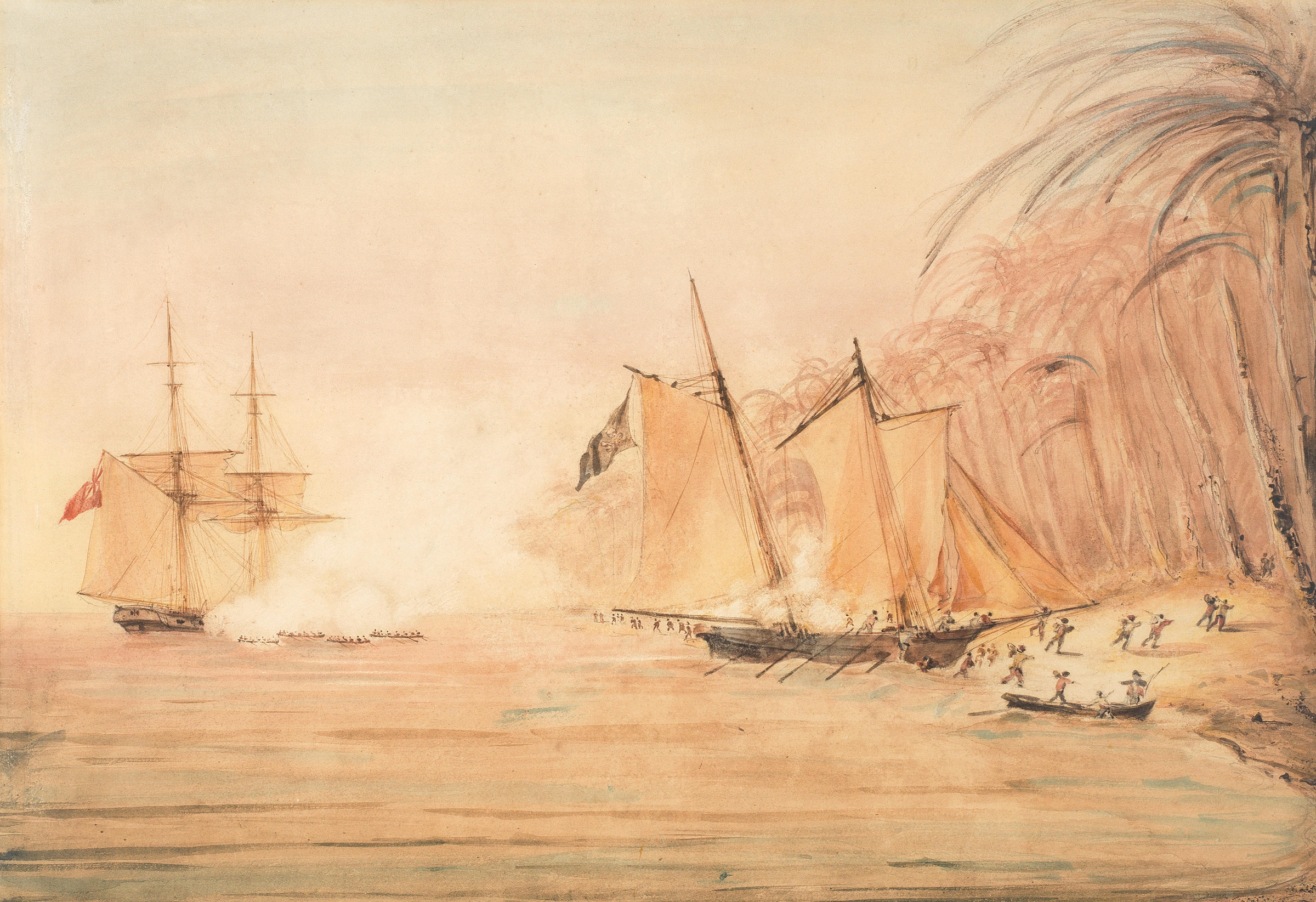
Chiffonne at the sack of Ras Al-Khaimah, the British soldiers reaching the beach, and setting fire to an Al Qasimi ship.)

Then in November, she and Caroline, together with a number of East Indiamen, participated in the campaign to suppress the strong fleets of the Al Qasimi of Ras Al Khaimah in the Persian Gulf. In an attack the British began with a cannonade of the town of Ras al Khaimah and followed with a ground attack. They destroyed some vessels, 30 of them very large dhows, together with much in the way of naval stores. Chiffonne's casualties amounted to two men wounded. She and Caroline destroyed the Persian towns of Linga and Laft on Qeshm Island. Chiffonne also destroyed 20 vessels, nine of them large dhows at Linga and eleven, nine of them large dhows, at Laft. This time the resistance on shore was more intense and Chiffonne lost one man killed and 17 wounded out of total British casualties (including men from the East India Company's vessels), of two killed and 27 wounded.

In January 1810 Chiffonne and Caroline carried Shenaz, which had rebelled against Sultan Sa'id of Oman and which they restored to him. Syyed Sa'id presented Wainwright with a scimitar in recognition of his efforts against the pirates. In November, Chiffonne rescued the crew of Mandarin, which had wrecked on Red Island, near Singapore.

== Fate ==
Chiffonne returned to Portsmouth in 1811. She was laid up there, but then repaired in 1812. In 1813 to 1814 she was in ordinary.

The Principal Officers and Commissioners of His Majesty's Navy offered "Chiffonne, of 36 guns and 945 tons", lying at Portsmouth, for sale on 11 August 1814. The buyer had to post a bond of £3,000, with two guarantors, that they would break up the vessel within a year of purchase. She was sold for breaking up for £1,700 at Portsmouth on 1 September 1814.
