= Bellona (1796 ship) =

History

Kingdom of Great Britain
- Name: Bellona
- Namesake: Bellona (goddess)
- Builder: David Glass & John Wood, Calcutta
- Launched: 22 June 1796
- Captured: 1801

General characteristics
- Tons burthen: 550, or 577, or 57752/94 (bm)
- Notes: Teak-built

Bellona was a three-decker merchantman launched at Calcutta in 1796. In 1799 she sailed to Great Britain and was admitted to the Registry of Great Britain in 1800. A French frigate captured her in 1801.

== Career ==
Bellona initially traded locally in Indian waters. She then sailed for Britain in 1789.

Bellona entered Lloyd's Register (LR) in 1800 with George Bowen, master, Lennox, owner, and trade London–India. She was admitted to the Registry of Great Britain on 10 January 1800. She then underwent fitting for the return voyage to India at a cost of £2736 8s 6d. Captain James Dunn sailed for Bengal on 4 December 1800.

== Fate ==
The French frigate Chiffonne captured Bellona on 16 June 1801 off the Cape of Good Hope. Bellona, Bowen, master was on her way from Calcutta to London. A prize crew under Ensign Jean-Michel Mahé took Bellona to Mauritius. Bellona arrived at Mauritius on 15 July.

== Bibliography ==
- Hackman, Rowan (2001). Ships of the East India Company. Gravesend, Kent: World Ship Society. ISBN 0-905617-96-7.
- Quintin, Danielle; Quintin, Bernard (2003). Dictionnaire des capitaines de Vaisseau de Napoléon. S.P.M. ISBN 2-901952-42-9.
- House of Commons, Parliament, Great Britain (1814). Minutes of the Evidence Taken Before the Select Committee on Petitions Relating to East-India-Built Shipping. H.M. Stationery Office.
