= Ottawa (1814 ship) =

UK merchant ship (1814–1822)

History

United Kingdom
- Name: Ottawa
- Namesake: Ottawa
- Launched: 1814, New Liverpool, Quebec
- Fate: Wrecked November 1822

General characteristics
- Tons burthen: 331, or 340, or 341 (bm)
- Length: 96 ft 3 in (29.3 m)
- Beam: 28 ft 10 in (8.8 m)
- Complement: 30
- Armament: 16 × 6-pounder guns
- Notes: Three masts

Ottawa was a merchant ship launched at Quebec in 1814 that sailed to England and acquired English registry. In 1815, a US privateer captured her. Although the Royal Navy recaptured her, the Vice-admiralty court at Jamaica restored her to her original captors. She later returned to British ownership and was wrecked in 1822.

== Career ==
A letter dated 21 October 1814 reported to the registry at Quebec that Ottawa had been re-registered at Liverpool.

Ottawa first appeared in Lloyd's Register (LR) in 1815.

Year	Master	Owner	Trade	Source
1815	J.Simpson	A.Garnett	Liverepool–Jamaica	LR

On 9 March 1815 the US privateer Kemp, Captain Joseph Almeda (or Almeida), captured the British merchantman Ottawa, James Simpson, master, which was off Cuba while sailing from Liverpool to Jamaica with a cargo of porter, soap, potatoes, hams, cheese, etc. (Note: Kemp was a schooner of 228 tons (bm; American). She was on her fifth cruise (her second under Almeida's command), was armed with six guns, and had a crew of 135 men. She may have been sailing out of Wilmington, North Carolina.)

American sources reported that Ottawa was armed with three guns, and had a crew of 17 men. Almeda spent three days transferring some of Ottawa's cargo to Kemp. He put a prize crew aboard her and the two vessels sailed for the United States. (Note: Some accounts refer to Ottawa as Otway.) Ottawa had struck after only one broadside from Kemp. In order to be able to store the prize goods she was carrying, Alameda collapsed some of his own water casks.

On 26 March Kemp encountered the United States schooner Ocean and from her learned of the end of the war. On 3 April Kemp reached Baltimore with a cargo valued at US$112,799.

However, also on 3 April, HMS Anaconda and Moselle recaptured Ottawa. The London merchant James Strachan Glennie protested the recapture, acting on behalf of Kemp and Joseph Almeda, arguing that the recapture had occurred during the period the Treaty of Ghent had established for restitution of captures. The Vice admiralty court of Jamaica found for Glennie. The first reports of Otway's capture too mention that she was probably a good prize because Kemp had left her after the period the treaty allowed for

Lloyd's List reported that Ottawa, Simpson, master, had put into Ocoa Bay after the American privateer Kemp had captured her. There boats from a British man of war had cut Ottawa out, and taken her to Jamaica. From Jamaica she had sailed to Savannah, and had arrived there. The 1816 issue of Lloyd's Register had the annotation "capt." beneath her name.

Ottawa returned to British ownership.

Year	Master	Owner	Trade	Source
1818	J.Anderson	Earl & Co.	Liverpool–New Orleans	LR
1819	J.Anderson; Campbell	Earl & Co.	Liverpool–New Orleans	LR
1822	Campbell; T.Todd	Earl & Co. Moxon & Co.	Liverpool–Africa; Liverpool–Miramichi	LR
1823	T.Todd	Moxon & Co.	Liverpool–Miramichi	LR

== Fate ==
A letter from Maranaham, dated 25 November 1822, reported that Ottawa, Todd, master, had been wrecked on 3 November on the Island of St Anna. Her crew had been saved. Ottawa was on a voyage from Liverpool to Maranhão.
