= French ship Aigle (1800) =

Ship of the line of the French Navy

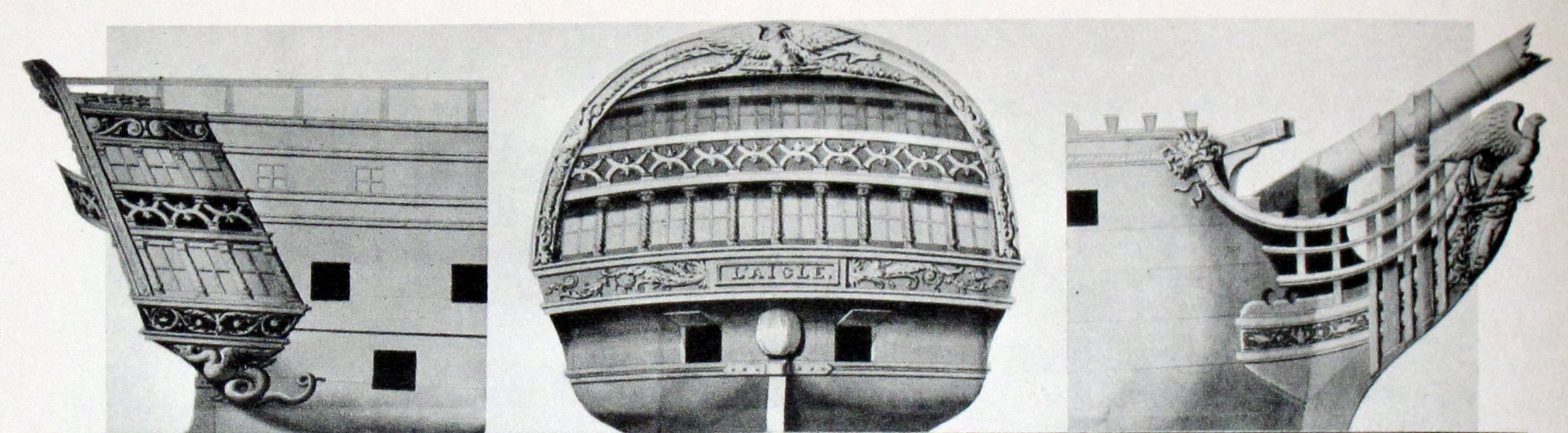
- Drawing of the main features of Aigle

History

France
- Name: Aigle
- Namesake: Eagle
- Builder: Rochefort
- Laid down: 1794
- Launched: 6 July 1800
- Captured: By the Royal Navy, 21 October 1805; By the French Navy, 22 October 1805
- Fate: Wrecked 23 October 1805

General characteristics
- Class & type: Téméraire-class ship of the line
- Displacement: 3,069 tonneaux
- Tons burthen: 1,537 port tonneaux
- Length: 55.87 m (183 ft 4 in)
- Beam: 14.46 m (47 ft 5 in)
- Draught: 7.15 m (23.5 ft)
- Depth of hold: 7.15 m (23 ft 5 in)
- Sail plan: Full-rigged ship
- Crew: 705
- Armament: 74 guns: Lower gun deck: 28 × 36 pdr guns; Upper gun deck: 30 × 18 pdr guns; Forecastle and Quarterdeck: 16 × 8 pdr guns

Aigle was a 74-gun Téméraire-class ship of the line built for the French Navy during the 1790s. Completed in 1801, she played a minor role in the Napoleonic Wars.

== Description ==
Designed by Jacques-Noël Sané, the Téméraire-class ships had a length of 55.87 metres (183 ft 4 in), a beam of 14.46 metres (47 ft 5 in) and a depth of hold of 7.15 metres (23 ft 5 in). The ships displaced 3,069 tonneaux and had a mean draught of 7.15 metres (23 ft 5 in). They had a tonnage of 1,537 port tonneaux. Their crew numbered 705 officers and ratings during wartime. They were fitted with three masts and ship rigged.

The muzzle-loading, smoothbore armament of the Téméraire class consisted of twenty-eight 36-pounder long guns on the lower gun deck and thirty 18-pounder long guns on the upper gun deck. On the quarterdeck and forecastle were a total of sixteen 8-pounder long guns. Beginning with the ships completed after 1787, the armament of the Téméraires began to change with the addition of four 36-pounder obusiers on the poop deck (dunette). Some ships had instead twenty 8-pounders.

== Construction and career ==
Aigle was laid down at the Arsenal de Rochefort on 26 December 1794 and named on 23 March 1795. The ship was launched on 6 July 1800, completed in February 1801 and commissioned on 14 April. In 1805 she sailed to the West Indies with her sister ship Algésiras where they joined a French fleet under Vice-Admiral Pierre-Charles Villeneuve. Aigle took part in the Battle of Trafalgar in October. She was captured during the battle by a boarding party from HMS Defiance. On the following day, her crew rose up against the British prize crew, and recaptured the ship. However, she was wrecked in the storm of 23 October.
