= Jean-Michel Mahé =

French Navy officer

Jean-Michel Mahé (12 October 1776 – 20 February 1833) was a French Navy officer.

== Career ==
Mahé started his career in the merchant Navy in 1789, and became an Midshipman in the Navy on 16 April 1794. He served on the fluyt Duras before embarking on Montagne, flagship of Villaret-Joyeuse on which he took part in the Glorious First of June.

From October 1794, he served on the frigate Fraternité, on which he took part in the Battle of Groix on 23 June 1795 under Lieutenant Florinville. He then served on the brig-aviso Impatient, the lugger Titus, and the felucca Fort.

On 7 July 1797, he was promoted to Ensign and given command of the schooner Gentille, escorting convoys off Bretagne. He served twice on the corvette Réolaise, captained the gunboat Caroline in the summer of 1800, and returned on Impatient from October 1800 to January 1801.

In February, he embarked on the frigate Chiffonne and took part in the capture of the Portuguese frigate Hirondelle on 16 May 1801. On 16 June, Chiffonne captured the East Indiaman Bellona on her way from Bengal to London. Mahé was given command of the captured ship, and a prize crew took Bellona to Mauritius where she arrived a month later. Mahé then returned to France on the merchantman Aventure.

On his return, Mahé was given command of the aviso Vigie, and promoted to Lieutenant on 5 March 1803. Vigie sailed from Cayenne at the head of a squadron consisting of herself and three privateer schooners. They were carrying troops to West Africa. They stopped at Dakar where more troops and two more vessels joined them, and then on 17–18 January 1804 captured Gorée from the British. (The British recaptured Gorée some months later.)

On 9 November 1804, Mahé was promoted to Commander and became first officer on Bucentaure in December 1804. On 23 February, he was given command of the frigate Hermione, on which he took part in the capture of HMS Cyane, the Battle of Cape Finisterre, in the Battle of Trafalgar and in Lamellerie's expedition. In late 1807, he took part in a division under Rear-Admiral Baudin, ferrying troops to Martinique, before decommissioning Hermione on 26 May 1808.

Mahé then served on Patriote as adjudant-commandant of the squadron before being promoted to Captain on 12 July 1808. He successively commanded Ville de Varsovie and Patriote in Rochefort. He took part in the Battle of the Basque Roads, where Patriote ran aground and Mahé ordered her artillery thrown overboard to refloat her; on the 12th, Patriote came under fire from the British squadron and Mahé sent his sick and his wounded ashore to prepare his crew for the evacuation of his ship, but she refloated in the night of the 13th and washed to safety under Fort Lupin.

Mahé then commanded Annibal in Toulon. On 18 November 1812, he took command of the 74-gun Borée, which he captained during the action of 5 November 1813 and until she was decommissioned on 13 June 1814. He eventually retired on 1 January 1816.
