= Jean-Gilles Filhol de Camas =

French Navy officer and captain

Jean-Gilles Filhol de Camas (French pronunciation: [ʒɑ̃ ʒil filɔl də kamɑ]; Raillette, Fumel, 7 December 1758 — Berwick, off Trafalgar, 21 October 1805) was a French Navy officer and captain.

== Career ==
Filhol-Camas started sailing as an assistant pilot in 1774 on the merchantman Superbe, of the French East India Company. He then joined another merchantman, Sainte Anne, bound for Ile de France. He quickly rose to first officer on the East India Company merchantman Duras.

He joined the French Royal Navy on 10 October 1778 with the rank of frigate sub-lieutenant and was appointed to the frigate Consolante, on which he served under Suffren. In 1780, he was promoted to Frigate Lieutenant, and took part on Consolante in the Battle of Trincomalee on 3 September 1782 and in the Battle of Cuddalore on 20 April 1783. Promoted to sub-Lieutenant on 1 May 1786, Filhol-Camas served at Toulon and Le Havre harbours, before returning to sail as an officer for the East India Company on Duc de Normandie.

After the outbreak French Revolution, Filhol-Camas joined the Navy again; he was promoted to Lieutenant on 1 January 1792 and appointed to the Nymphe, on ferry duty to Guyane. He transferred to the 74-gun Trajan on 6 March 1793, on which he took part in the Bataille du 13 prairial an 2 and in the Croisière du Grand Hiver. He then transferred on Tigre as first officer, under Captain Jacques Bedout, and took part in the Battle of Groix where he was severely wounded.

Promoted to Commander on 21 March 1796, he was appointed to the Zélé, but suspended on 2 October 1797 for his relations to one of the deportees of the Coup of 18 Fructidor; he was reinstated on 14 December 1799 after his superiors protested. He was then appointed to the 74-gun Scipion before being put in command of the 16-gun Bergère on 19 November 1802.

On 9 August 1803, Filhol-Camas was appointed to the frigate Muiron. He was promoted to Captain on 24 September 1803 and awarded the Legion of Honour on 5 February 1804, rising to Officer of the order on 14 June.

Appointed to captain the 74-gun Berwick on 5 September 1805, On Berwick, Filhol-Camas took part in the Battle of Diamond Rock, the Battle of Cape Finisterre and the Battle of Trafalgar. At the Battle of Trafalgar, Filhol-Camas was hit by a round shot and killed instantly, his body cut in two pieces.

== Sources and references ==
=== Bibliography ===
- Quintin, Danielle; Quintin, Bernard (2003). Dictionnaire des capitaines de Vaisseau de Napoléon. S.P.M. ISBN 2-901952-42-9.
- Fonds Marine. Campagnes (opérations; divisions et stations navales; missions diverses). Inventaire de la sous-série Marine BB4. Tome premier : BB4 1 à 482 (1790-1826)
- Fonds Marine. Campagnes (opérations; divisions et stations navales; missions diverses). Inventaire de la sous-série Marine BB4. Tome deuxième : BB4 1 à 482 (1790-1826)
- FILHOL de CAMAS, Jean Gilles, thierry.pouliquen.free.fr
- Levot, Prosper (1866). Les gloires maritimes de la France: notices biographiques sur les plus célèbres marins (in French). Bertrand. p. 182.
