= French ship Algésiras (1804) =

Ship of the line of the French Navy

- Scale model of Achille, sister ship of French ship Algésiras (1804), on display at the Musée national de la Marine in Paris.

History

France
- Name: Algésiras
- Namesake: Battle of Algeciras
- Builder: Lorient
- Laid down: 20 July 1801
- Launched: 8 July 1804
- Captured: By the Royal Navy, 21 October 1805; By the French Navy, 22 October 1805; By Spain, 14 June 1808

Spain
- Name: Algeciras
- Acquired: 14 June 1808
- Decommissioned: July 1817
- Stricken: After 1818
- Fate: Sank at her moorings, 1829

General characteristics (1805)
- Class & type: Téméraire-class ship of the line
- Displacement: 3,069 tonneaux
- Tons burthen: 1,537 port tonneaux
- Length: 55.44 m (181 ft 11 in)
- Beam: 14.45 m (47 ft 5 in)
- Draught: 7.15 m (23 ft 5 in)
- Depth of hold: 7.15 m (23 ft 5 in)
- Sail plan: Full-rigged ship
- Crew: 705
- Armament: 74 muzzle-loading, smoothbore guns: Lower gun deck: 28 × 36 pdr guns; Upper gun deck: 30 × 18 pdr guns; Forecastle and Quarterdeck: 20 × 8 pdr guns

Algésiras was a 74-gun short Téméraire-class ship of the line built for the French Navy during the first decade of the 19th century. Completed in 1804, she played a minor role in the Napoleonic Wars. The ship participated in the Battle of Cape Finisterre in 1805 and was heavily engaged during the subsequent Battle of Trafalgar. The British boarded and captured Algésiras during the battle, but her crew was able to recapture the ship during the storm that followed the battle. They sought shelter in Cádiz, Spain, afterward.

Together with a few other French ships that had taken refuge there, Algésiras was captured by the Spanish when Spain switched sides in 1808 after France attempted to occupy Spain. Renamed Algeciras, the ship spent most of her time ferrying troops and supplies around the Spanish Empire during the war. She also transported French prisoners to the Balearics in 1809 and England in 1810. Two years later Algeciras helped to take Spanish troops to Mexico during the Mexican War of Independence and blockaded Veracruz. The ship was placed in ordinary in 1817, sank at her moorings the following year, but was refloated. Despite this, she was abandoned in place and sank in 1829 for lack of maintenance.

== Description ==
The so-called short class of the Téméraires consisted two ships shortened by 65 centimetres (26 in) while under construction to meet the requirements of the Minister of Marine, Pierre-Alexandre-Laurent Forfait. The ships had a length of 55.44 metres (181 ft 11 in), a beam of 14.45 metres (47 ft 5 in) and a depth of hold of 7.15 metres (23 ft 5 in). The ships displaced 3,069 tonneaux and had a mean draught of 7.15 metres (23 ft 5 in). They had a tonnage of 1,537 port tonneaux. Their crew numbered 705 officers and ratings during wartime. They were fitted with three masts and ship rigged.

The muzzle-loading, smoothbore armament of the Téméraire class consisted of twenty-eight 36-pounder long guns on the lower gun deck and thirty 18-pounder long guns on the upper gun deck. On the forecastle and quarterdeck were a total of sixteen 8-pounder long guns. Beginning with the ships completed after 1787, the armament of the Téméraires began to change with the addition of four 36-pounder obusiers on the poop deck (dunette). By the time of the Battle of Trafalgar in 1805, Algésiras was fitted with twenty 8-pounders.

== Construction and career ==
Algésiras was ordered from the Arsenal de Lorient on 26 August 1799 and was subcontracted out to the Caudan Brothers who her laid down on 20 July 1801 at the arsenal's annex at Caudan. The ship was named on 14 November and launched on 8 July 1804. She was commissioned by Capitaine de vaisseau Jean-Baptiste Willaumez on 27 August and completed the following month. Algésiras transferred to Brest on 9 January 1805. Serving as the flagship of Rear Admiral Charles Magon, she sailed to the West Indies on 1 May from Rochefort with her half-sister Achille where they joined a French fleet under Vice-Admiral Pierre-Charles Villeneuve on 29 May.

=== Battle of Trafalgar ===
Artist's conception of the situation at noon as Royal Sovereign was breaking into the Franco-Spanish line. The depiction of Nelson's northern column is incorrect as he aimed much closer to the leading ships, before turning south and paralleling the Franco-Spanish line before turning east towards the French flagship, the 86-gun Bucentaure.

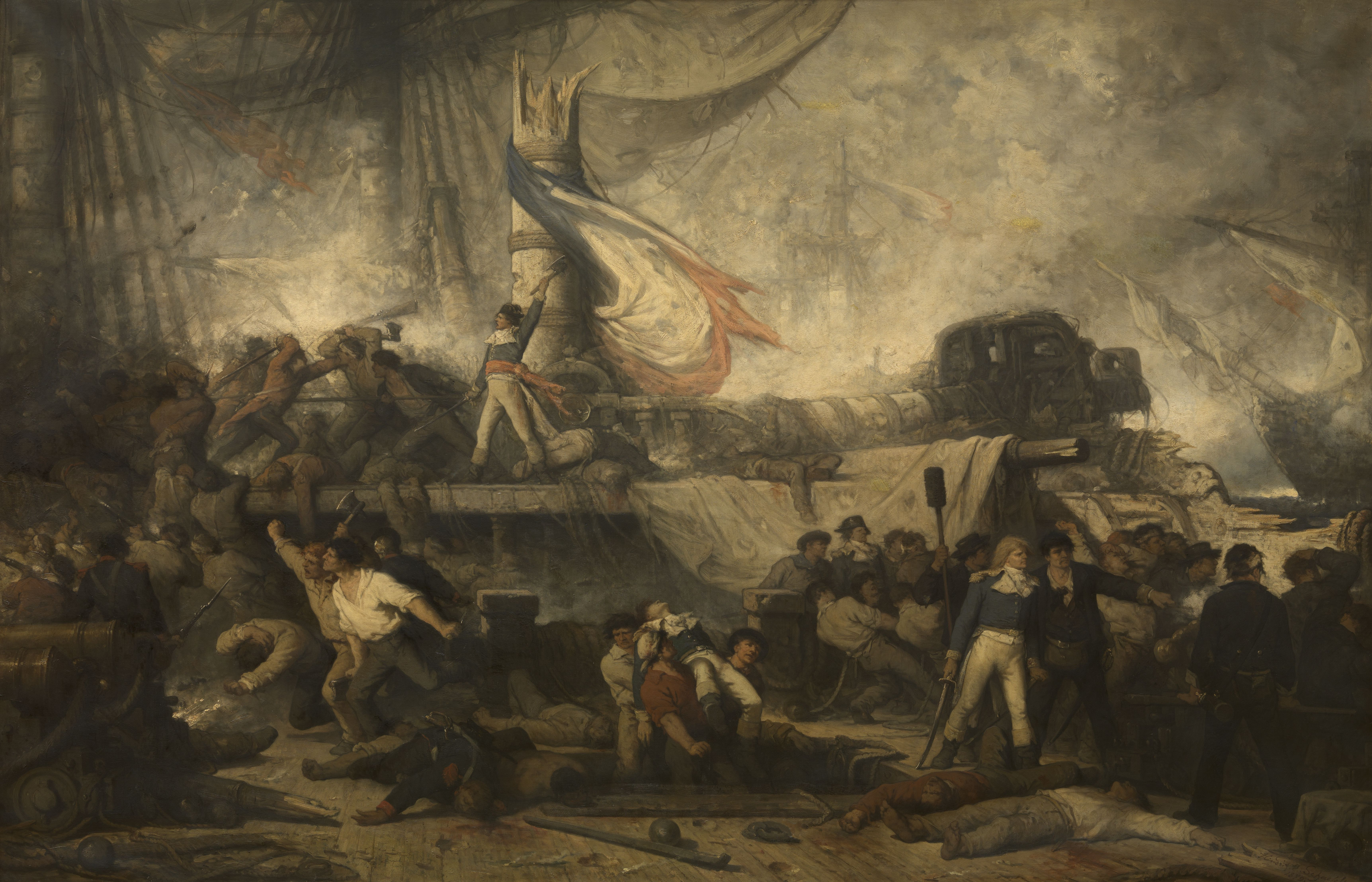
1879 painting of Algésiras at Trafalgar

Having fought the inconclusive Battle of Cape Finisterre on 22 July against a British fleet that attempted to intercept his combined Franco-Spanish fleet returning from the West Indies, Villeneuve decided to disobey his orders to rendezvous with the French ships at Brest because his ships needed repairs and many crewmen were sick. He put into the nearest friendly port, Vigo, Spain. Unhappy with the inability of the Spanish dockyards in Galicia to repair his ships and influenced by the Spanish commander, Admiral Federico Gravina, who had secret orders not to allow his ships to go to Brest, Villeneuve decided to head south to the largest concentration of Spanish ships on the Atlantic coast, and arrived at Cádiz on 20 August.

Before the Battle of Trafalgar began on 21 October, Algéciras was assigned to the Squadron of Observation under the overall command of Gravina, although Magon remained aboard the ship with the command of half of the squadron. Villeneuve initially ordered Magon to sortie on 18 October and engage the British frigates keeping watch on Cádiz, but countermanded his order when he was informed that some of Vice-Admiral Horatio Nelson's ships had been spotted at Gibraltar. Believing that he now had a sufficient superiority of numbers to defeat the British, Villeneuve now ordered the combined fleet to prepare to sail, but the winds did not cooperate. Magon's ships were able to leave the Bay of Cádiz on the morning tide on 19 October, but the rest of the fleet was only able to enter the bay. Villeneuve spent the next day generally heading west while Magon's ships pursued the frigates, Héros getting close enough to fire a broadside at Sirius before being ordered to fall back on the fleet at the end of the day. Once night fell, they could see British signal lights and flares at a distance that they estimated to be only two miles away. Villeneuve ordered his ships to form line of battle and then ordered a turn to the south east. In the darkness, these commands were more than the inexperienced crews could easily handle and the combined fleet could only form into several ragged lines. When dawn broke, Villeneuve saw that Nelson had put his ships in a position threaten his rear; Villeneuve decided to reverse course to protect his rear and move closer to refuge in Cádiz despite the very light winds that morning. His command ruined whatever semblance of order the Combined Fleet had as each ship had to maneuver as best they could as they each handled differently in the light winds. In addition, many of the bigger ships were driven to the east by the ocean's swell. Villeneuve's neat organization of three divisions, each of seven ships and Gravina's Squadron of Observation as the tactical reserve had been replaced by chaos with ships scattered across the sea.

By the time that Nelson's ships in two columns were approaching the combined fleet around noon, it had shaken itself into a rough curved line, although the ships were not evenly spaced apart with large gaps between clusters of ships. Algéciras was ninth from the rear of the fleet, leading the Squadron of Observation. Vice-Admiral Cuthbert Collingwood led the British fleet's southern, or lee, column in his 100-gun HMS Royal Sovereign and steered into the gap between the Spanish 112-gun Santa Ana and the French 74-gun Fougueux. Algéciras engaged Royal Sovereign at long range as she approached the Combined Fleet shortly after noon. The 80-gun HMS Tonnant, the fourth ship in Collingwood's column, sailed through the gap between the Spanish 74-gun Monarca and the trailing Algéciras about 12:30, pouring a double-shotted broadside into the Spanish ship's stern with devastating effect and firing another at Algéciras with rather less effect. Tonnant turned north after passing through the gap to better engage Monarca while Algéciras approached. The latter ship managed to rake Tonnant's stern at point-blank range with one broadside before Captain Charles Tyler was able to turn his ship to starboard. This maneuver caused Algéciras's bowsprit to become entangled in the shrouds of Tonnant's mainmast.

Magon quickly ordered Lieutenant Guillaume Verdreau to gather his soldiers and marines and board Tonnant across the bowsprit. The British were alert to the possibility and the boarding party was nearly wiped out by grapeshot fired by the guns mounted on the forecastle and quarterdeck. Verdreau and the commander of the marines were both killed and Magon was wounded in the arm. Shortly afterward, Algéciras swung parallel to Tonnant and the pair exchanged broadsides for the next hour with their hulls grinding together. Burning wads from Tonnant's guns started a small fire aboard the French ship, killing three men, but it was quickly put out. Tonnant's crew played a fire hose over both hulls to put out any fires ignited by the muzzle blast of the guns firing from inside the hulls.

Algésiras finally surrendered to Tonnant at around 14:30. During the storm after the battle, her crew rose up against the British prize crew, and recaptured the ship. She sailed to Cádiz flying French colours. On 14 June 1808 she was captured by the Spanish along with all the other French ships in Cadiz when Spain switched sides and declared war on France.

== Spanish service ==
The ship's name was changed to the Spanish spelling, Algeciras. She ferried the ambassador of the Spanish Supreme Central Junta and his staff to Britain to purchase weapons and supplies in February 1809. Shortly after her arrival the ship was docked to repair leaks. After returning to Cádiz, Algeciras transported French prisoners to Cabrera Island in the Balearic Islands while also delivering supplies and money to troops in Tarragona, Catalonia, and Mallorca in the Balearics in August–September. Two months later she departed for Havana, Cuba, and Veracruz, Mexico, and returned with money, weapons and supplies in May 1810. In July the ship ferried French prisoners from Cádiz to England and was careened to have the marine growth removed from her hull in March 1811 before returning to Cádiz in April. She took troops and supplies to Tarragona and other Mediterranean ports from June to August.

That mission was the ship's last time that she participated in the Napoleonic Wars. Henceforth, she was tasked with missions dealing with the Spanish colonies. Algeciras, the 52-gun navío Miño, the frigate Venganza and several cargo ships transported 1,400 troops and supplies from A Coruña to Veracruz, arriving there in January 1812 during the Mexican War of Independence. The troops fought rebels while Algeciras blockaded Veracruz for some time before departing on 6 December. The ship was damaged by a storm and put into Havana on 5 January 1813 for repairs and to be careened. She departed on 13 April and ultimately arrived in Cádiz on 17 May 1814. Algeciras was placed in ordinary in July 1817 at the Arsenal de La Carraca and sank in October 1818 for lack of maintenance. The ship was refloated, but was abandoned and stricken from the navy list. She finally sank again on 1829 for lack of careening.
