= Michel Chesneau =

French Navy officer (1757–1832)

Michel-Jean-André Chesneau (French pronunciation: [miʃɛl ʒɑ̃ ɑ̃dʁe ʃɛsno]; 29 September 1757 – 25 July 1832) was a French Navy officer, commander of the frigate Rhin during the Battle of Trafalgar.

== Biography ==
Chesneau was born in Rouen. He started sailing in the merchant navy in 1770. In 1778, he joined the French Royal navy as a pilot.

Returned to merchantmen in 1783, he joined the Navy again in 1793 with the rank of lieutenant.

He captained the frigate Rhin during the Battle of Trafalgar.

He died in Brest.
