= Spanish ship Santa Ana (1784) =

Ship of the line of the Spanish Navy

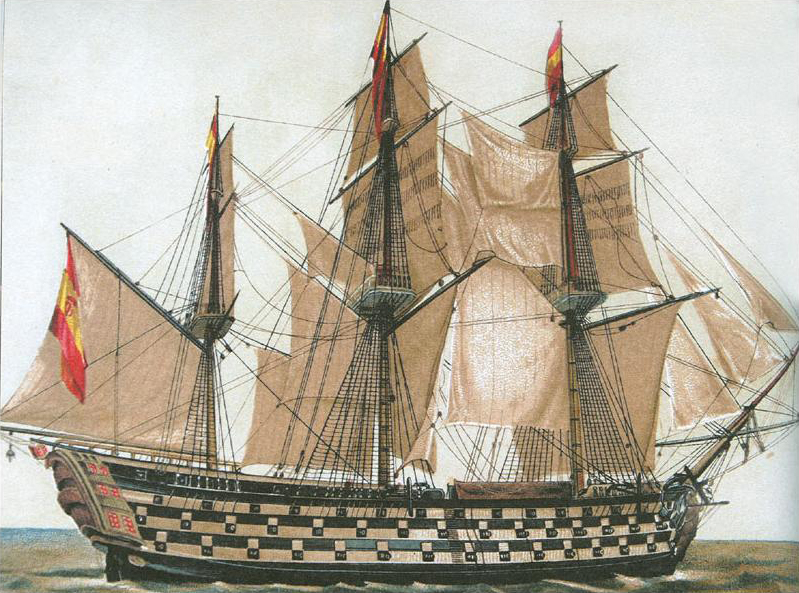
- 19th-century illustration of Santa Ana

History

Spain
- Name: Santa Ana
- Ordered: 3 February 1783
- Builder: Reales Astilleros de Esteiro, Ferrol
- Laid down: June 1783
- Launched: 28 September 1784
- Commissioned: 28 February 1785
- Fate: Sunk, Havana, 1816
- Notes: Participated in: Battle of Trafalgar (1805)

General characteristics
- Class & type: Santa Ana-class ship of the line
- Tonnage: 2,112 tonnes
- Length: 59.5 m (195 ft)
- Beam: 16.2 m (53 ft)
- Sail plan: Full-rigged ship
- Complement: 1,102 (at Trafalgar)
- Armament: On launch: 30 × 36-pounder cannon; 32 × 24-pounder cannon; 32 × 12-pounder cannon; 18 × 8-pounder cannon; At Trafalgar: 30 × 36-pounder cannon; 32 × 24-pounder cannon; 32 × 12-pounder cannon; 10 × 8-pounder cannon; 10 × 48-pounder obúses (howitzers); 2 × 32-pounder obúses; 6 × 24-pounder obúses; 4 × 4-pounder pedreros (swivel guns)
- Armour: None

Santa Ana was a 112-gun ship of the line of the Spanish Navy built to plans drawn by the shipwright Miguel de la Puente following a specification issued by José Romero y Fernández de Landa. Her actual constructor at Ferrol, Spain was Honorato Bouyón. She was the prototype and lead ship of the Santa Ana class, also known as los Meregildos, which were built during the following years at Ferrol and Havana and which formed the backbone of the Spanish Navy - the other ships were the Mexicano, Conde de Regla, Salvador del Mundo, Real Carlos, San Hermenegildo, Reina María Luisa and Príncipe de Asturias. Her dimensions were 213.4 Burgos feet (one foot = 0.2786m, so ~ 59m) long, 58 feet (~ 16m) in the beam and a total tonnage of 2,112 tonnes.

== History ==
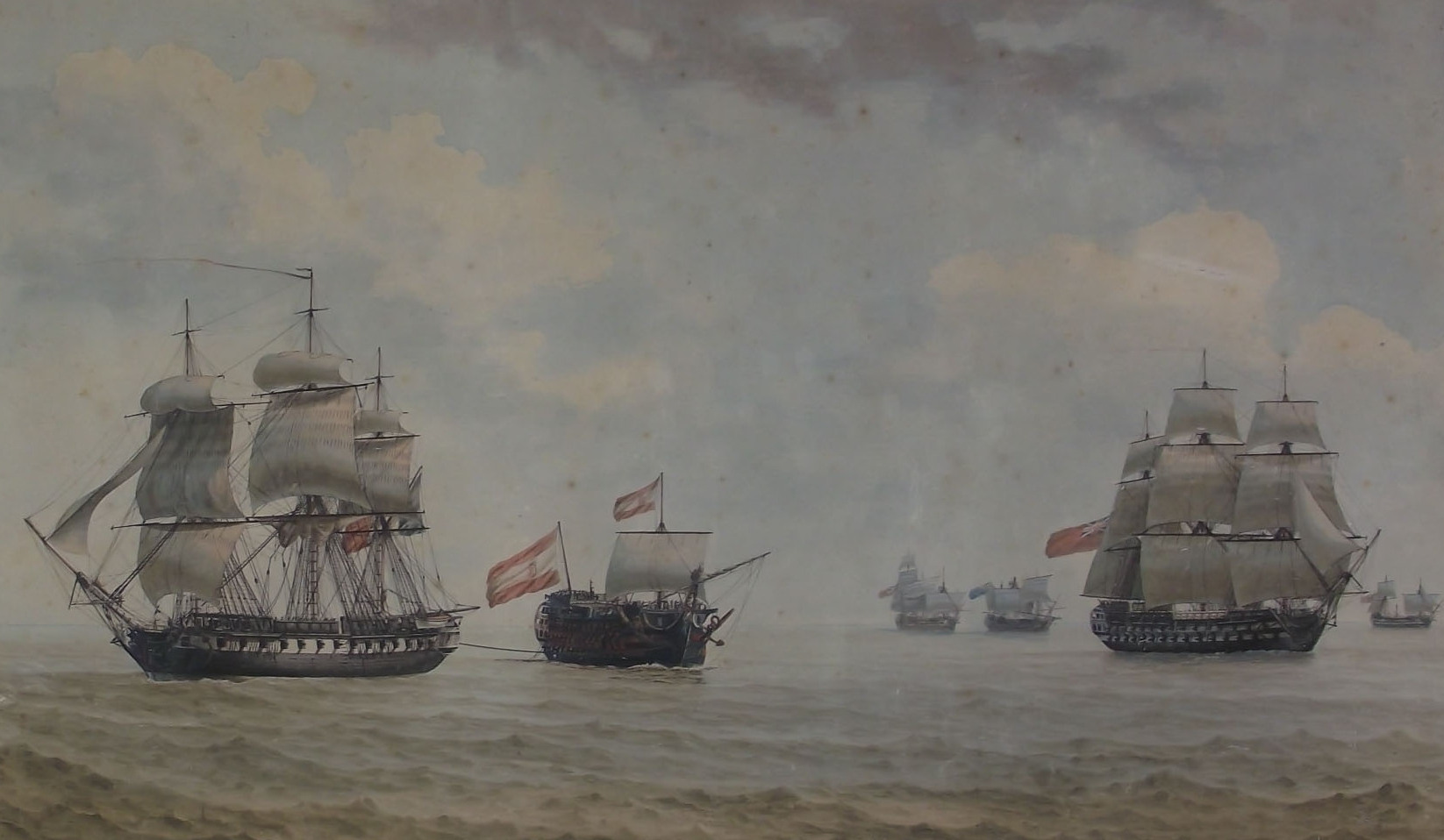
Thémis with Santa Ana in tow in the aftermath of the Battle of Trafalgar

She was launched on 28 September 1784 at the Reales Astilleros de Esteiro, at Ferrol. She was tested at sea on 28 February 1785 under the captaincy of Félix de Tejada, who reported the test to his commanding officer that the ship "kept the battery in good use [even] in a fresh wind and heavy seas". The success of the trials led to a royal order that subsequent three-deckers would be built to the same plans.

From 1803 to 1804 she was captained by Dionisio Alcalá Galiano. At the Battle of Trafalgar she was the flagship of Ignacio María de Álava and captained by José Ramón de Gardoqui - she suffered 97 killed and 141 wounded, with Alava himself seriously wounded, and was captured by the British. However, two days later, a squadron under the command of Commodores Enrique Macdonell and Julien Cosmao sallied from Cádiz and succeeded in recapturing her and getting her back to Cádiz.

At the start of the Peninsular War in 1808 Santa Ana was undergoing repairs at the Arsenal and so could not participate in the capture of the Rosily Squadron. She and her sister ship Príncipe de Asturias sailed to Havana in September 1810 to avoid being captured by the French; there, Príncipe de Asturias struck a rock and sank in 1814 while Santa Ana sunk at anchor in 1816 due to a lack of careening and structural defects. In 1834 Santa Ana's wreck could still be seen next to that of Príncipe de Asturias in the mud in front of the Havana Arsenal.
