= French frigate Hermione (1804) =

French Navy vessel

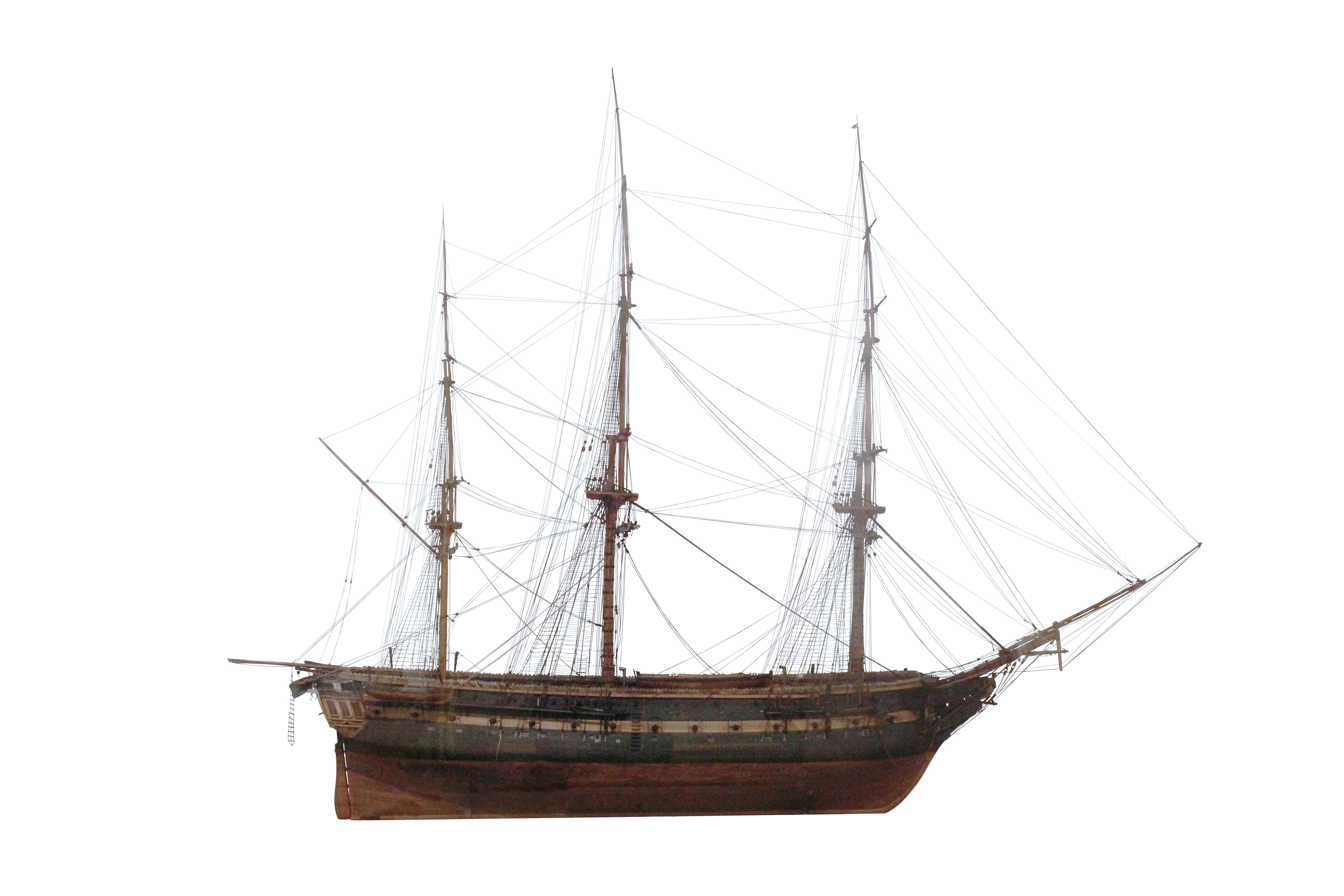
- Hortense, sister-ship of Hermione

History

France
- Name: République Italienne
- Namesake: Italian Republic
- Renamed: Hermione 26 December 1803
- Namesake: Hermione
- Launched: 2 December 1804
- Fate: Wrecked 18 August 1808

General characteristics
- Class & type: Hortense-class frigate
- Displacement: 1,390 tonnes
- Tons burthen: 720 tonnes
- Length: 48.75 m (159.9 ft)
- Beam: 12.2 m (40 ft)
- Draught: 5.9 m (19 ft)
- Propulsion: Sails
- Sail plan: Ship
- Armament: 40 guns; 28 × 18-pounder long guns; 12 × 8-pounder long guns

Hermione was a 40-gun Hortense-class frigate of the French Navy launched in 1804 and wrecked in 1808.

Ordered by the Italian Republic as a gift to France under the name République Italienne, she was renamed Hermione on 26 December 1803. She was launched in December 1804.

Under Captain Jean-Michel Mahé, she took part in the capture of the Royal Navy 18-gun sloop-of-war HMS Cyane in May 1805, the Battle of Cape Finisterre on 22 July 1805, the Battle of Trafalgar on 21 October 1805, and Lamellerie's expedition of February–July 1806. In late 1807, she was part of a division under Rear-Admiral François-André Baudin, ferrying troops to Martinique.

Hermione was wrecked in Iroise on 18 August 1808. Her wreck was discovered in 1972.
