= Louis-Charles-Auguste Delamarre de Lamellerie =

French Navy officer and nobleman

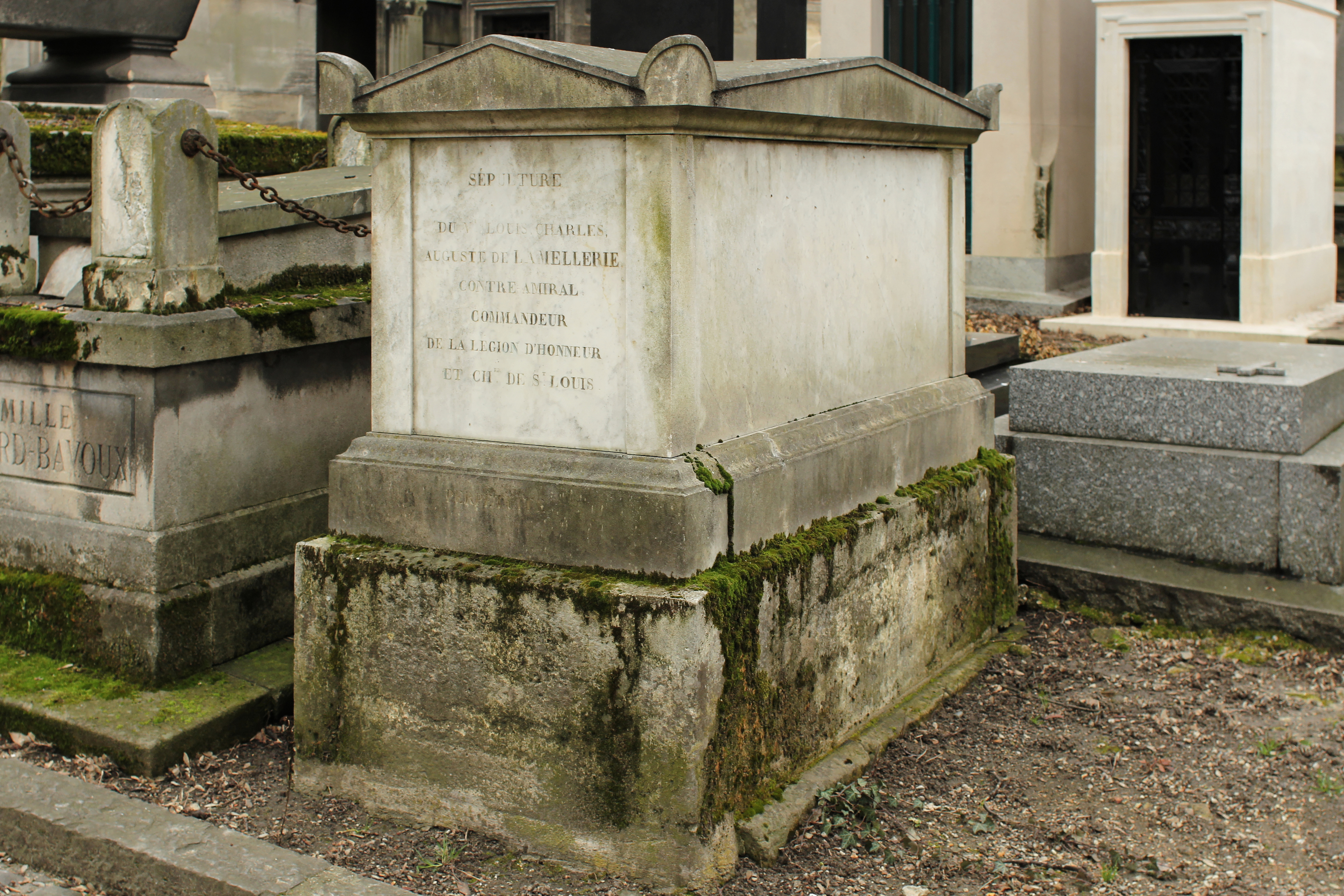
Père-Lachaise

Louis-Charles-Auguste Delamarre, vicomte de Lamellerie (1 May 1771 — 6 August 1840) was a French Navy officer and nobleman. He is buried in Pere Lachaise cemetery (division 8), in Paris.

== Career ==
Born to a family of low nobility, Lamellerie entered the French Royal Navy as a midshipman on 4 April 1787, serving on the gabare Écluse. He transferred to the frigate Capricieuse on 9 July 1788, and to Andromaque on 30 October, serving off Santo Domingo. There, he transferred on the 74-gun Fougueux on 1 November 1790, and later to the fluyt Dromadaire.

On 29 October 1793, he was promoted to enseigne de vaisseau non entretenu, (Note: Similar in rank to Ensign, but without a full pay and without authority and uniform while off duty. The rank was obtained after a mere exam, rather than the competitive exam required for full ensign.) he served on the corvette Assemblée nationale from October to November, on the 74-gun Mucius from November to December, on the brig Citoyen from December 1793 to September 1795, and the 74-gun Trajan in November 1795.

Promoted to Lieutenant, (Note: first lieutenant de vaisseau auxiliaire on 27 November 1795 and lieutenant de vaisseau entretenu on 21 March 1796) Lamellerie served on the Droits de l'Homme from November 1795 to November 1796. He then transferred to the frigate Bravoure.

Promoted to Commander on 22 January 1799, he served on Indivisible before being appointed to captain the frigate Sirène on 22 July 1800.

Promoted to Captain on 24 September 1803, Lamellerie took command of the frigate Hortense and was sent to observe British movements off Toulon, along with the 40-gun Incorruptible. On 4 February 1804, they attacked a convoy, destroying 7 ships. Three days later, they encountered the convoy escorted by the 20-gun sloop HMS Arrow and the 8-gun bomb vessel HMS Acheron; after a one-hour fight and in a sinking condition, Arrow struck her colours and foundered, while Acheron was destroyed. Lamellerie was made a Knight of the Legion of Honour the next day, and promoted to Officer of the Legion of Honour on 14 June.

Hortense was then appointed to Villeneuve's fleet, and took part in the Battle of Cape Finisterre and in the Battle of Trafalgar. After reaching Cadiz, Lamellerie was appointed to a frigate division, which he led in Lamellerie's expedition ferrying troops to Segenal and patrolling in the Atlantic and in the Caribbean.

On 20 September 1810, Lamellerie took command of the Triomphant in Rochefort, which he captained until 26 July 1814. At the peace, Lamellerie sailed to Plymouth to ferry prisoners of war back to Brest.

After the Bourbon Restoration, Lamellerie was awarded the Order of Saint-Louis on 18 August 1814, and was appointed to Aréthuse and task with retaking possession of Guadeloupe and ferry her new governor. He was made a vicomte on 24 May 1818. On 30 December 1820, he took command of the frigate Jeanne d'Arc, which he captained until 17 December 1822. He relieved Admiral Halgan at the command of the squadron of the Levant.

Lamellerie retired on 12 October 1828 with the rank of honorary Rear-Admiral. On the 30th, he was promoted to Commander of the Legion of Honour.

== Sources and references ==
=== Bibliography ===
- Quintin, Danielle et Bernard (2003). Dictionnaire des capitaines de Vaisseau de Napoléon. S.P.M. ISBN 2-901952-42-9.
- Roche, Jean-Michel (2005). Dictionnaire des bâtiments de la flotte de guerre française de Colbert à nos jours 1 1671 - 1870. p. 25. ISBN 978-2-9525917-0-6. OCLC 165892922.
- Troude, Onésime-Joachim (1867). Batailles navales de la France. Vol. 3. Challamel ainé.
- Troude, Onésime-Joachim (1867). Batailles navales de la France. Vol. 4. Challamel ainé.
- Fonds Marine. Campagnes (opérations; divisions et stations navales; missions diverses). Inventaire de la sous-série Marine BB4. Tome deuxième : BB4 1 à 482 (1790-1826)
