= Henry Heathcote =

Royal Navy Admiral (1777–1851)

Admiral Sir Henry Heathcote
- Born: 20 January 1777
- Died: 16 August 1851 (aged 74); Ingouville, France
- Relatives: Sir William Heathcote, 3rd Baronet (father); Gilbert Heathcote (brother)
- Military career
- Allegiance: United Kingdom
- Branch: Royal Navy
- Service years: 1790–1851
- Rank: Admiral
- Commands: HMS Alliance; HMS Romulus; HMS Galatea; HMS Desiree; HMS Lion; HMS Scipion
- Conflicts: French Revolutionary Wars; Capture of Corsica; Battle of Genoa; Battle of Hyères Islands; Napoleonic Wars; Invasion of Java; Action of 5 November 1813
- Awards: Knight Bachelor

Admiral Sir Henry Heathcote (20 January 1777 – 16 August 1851) was an officer of the Royal Navy who served during the French Revolutionary and Napoleonic Wars.

Heathcote was born into a gentry family in 1777, the son of a baronet. He entered the navy several years before the start of the French Revolutionary Wars, and after seeing action in the Mediterranean, was advanced to lieutenant in 1795. After several acting commands he became a post-captain but saw no further service until the outbreak of the Napoleonic Wars. He took a frigate out to the West Indies, and achieved some successes against privateers. An attempt to cut out a moored privateer in 1804 ended in failure and heavy casualties after the French defenders were forewarned.

Heathcote then went out to the East Indies commanding a ship of the line. After service transporting the ambassadors to Persia, he was based on the Indian coast. While there he took a bold decision to open despatches and then quit his post to deliver them to the station commanders, who were at the time involved in the Java Expedition. He was court-martialed for this, but though several charges were proved, he was judged to have acted in the service's best interests, and was acquitted. He went out to the Mediterranean late in the Napoleonic Wars, and commanded the inshore squadron during the blockade of Toulon. He led one of the last attacks on the French Mediterranean Fleet at the action of 5 November 1813, and retired ashore after the end of the wars. He developed a new technique for hoisting staysails, received further promotions, and a knighthood, while in retirement, before his death in 1851 at the rank of admiral.

== Family and early life ==
Henry Heathcote was born on 20 January 1777, the fourth son of Sir William Heathcote, 3rd Baronet and his wife, Frances.

William Heathcote was Member of Parliament for Hampshire between 1790 and 1806, and had his seat, Hursley House, in that county. Henry's younger brother, Gilbert, would also have a naval career, dying a post-captain in 1831. Henry Heathcote entered the navy in 1790, serving aboard the 74-gun HMS Captain under Captain Archibald Dickson in the English Channel. He served on several other ships during the last years of peace and the start of the French Revolutionary Wars, and was successively aboard the 74-gun HMS Colossus, the 28-gun HMS Proserpine in the West Indies, the 74-gun HMS America and the 36-gun HMS Inconstant.

By 1794, he was serving aboard the 74-gun HMS Egmont at the capture of Corsica, though he later moved to serve as a midshipman aboard the 98-gun HMS Princess Royal. While with Princess Royal he saw action at the first of engagements fought under Vice-Admiral, and later Admiral, Sir William Hotham.

The first was the Battle of Genoa on 14 March 1795, in which Princess Royal flew the flag of Vice-Admiral Samuel Goodall and sustained casualties of four killed and eight wounded.

For the second action, the Battle of Hyères Islands on 13 July 1795, Heathcote was a master's mate aboard the 28-gun HMS Cyclops, commanded by Admiral Hotham's nephew, William Hotham.

Heathcote was finally confirmed as a lieutenant on 19 September 1795, and appointed to the 100-gun HMS Britannia. In June 1797 he was appointed as acting-commander of the 20-gun storeship HMS Alliance, still in the Mediterranean. He was given a further acting command on 7 November 1797, that of the 36-gun HMS Romulus, with orders to take her back to Britain for paying off.

He arrived back in Britain in early 1798, and was promoted to post-captain on 5 February 1798. His promotion apparently brought about a break in his service, as he is not recorded commanding another ship until 1803, after the resumption of the wars with France.

== Napoleonic Wars ==
Heathcote was appointed to command the 32-gun HMS Galatea on 4 April 1803, and on 8 July she sailed to take up position as guardship off The Needles. In February 1804 Galatea sailed to the West Indies as escort to a convoy of 150 merchant vessels.

He had some success against privateers in the West Indies, until 14 August, when he made an attempt to cut out the French privateer Général Ernouf, the former British sloop-of-war Lily. She was sheltering at the Saintes near Guadeloupe where shore batteries could protect her. Heathcote had been too obvious in his reconnoitering and the French were waiting for the night attack.

In all, the British lost some 10 men killed, including Lieutenant Charles Hayman, the commander of the boarding party and first lieutenant of Galatea, and 55 or more wounded or captured. The French lost four killed and suffered some wounded, among them Captain Lapointe, commander of the Général Ernouf, and Lieutenant Mouret, commander of the detachment of troops the French stationed aboard her in anticipation of the attack. The French also captured Galatea's barge, which the other three boats of the cutting out party could not retrieve as they made their escape.

Heathcote remained in the West Indies until April 1805, when he took command of the 36-gun HMS Desiree and sailed her back to Britain escorting a convoy of 101 ships, afterwards paying her off. He was appointed to command the Isle of Wight Sea Fencibles on 21 March 1807, and received his next sea-going command in February 1808, when he took over the 64-gun HMS Lion.

He made two voyages to India, carrying Gore Ouseley and Mirza Abolhassan Khan Ilchi, the ambassadors between Persia and Britain. They would be instrumental in arranging for Heathcote's knighthood in 1819. Heathcote then sailed to the East Indies in July 1810 and served at the capture of Java in 1811. His service here was not without controversy, and on 30 August 1811 he was tried by court-martial for breach of the 27th article of war, for disobeying orders, and for neglect of duty.^{[a]}

=== Court-martial ===
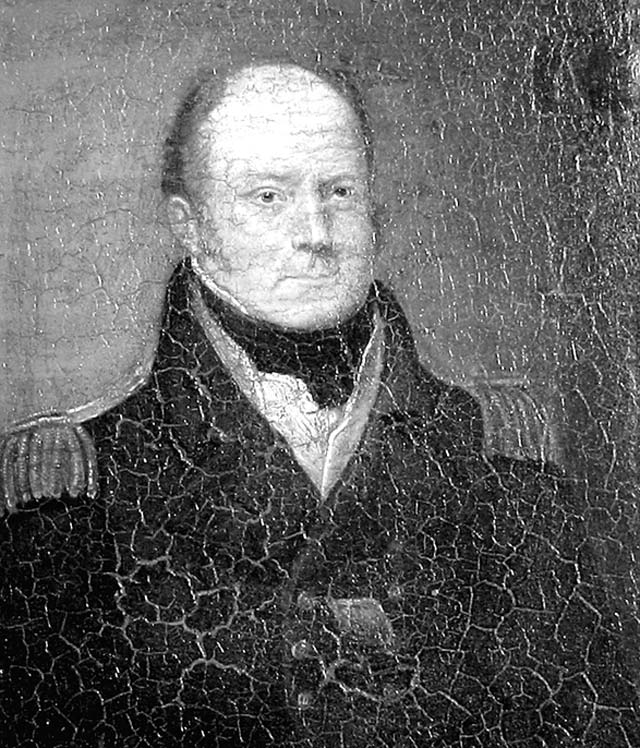
William Robert Broughton, who in 1811 pushed for Heathcote to be court-martialed

Vice-Admiral William O'Bryen Drury had placed Heathcote in charge of the defence of the west Indian coast, orders which were confirmed by Commodore William Robert Broughton after Drury's sudden death in March 1811. Broughton subsequently went out with the Java Expedition, and was en route when HMS Hussar arrived at Bombay carrying despatches.

Aware that with Broughton absent, any important orders that the despatches contained might go unread for some time, Heathcote took the unusual step of opening them. The despatches contained a warning that eighteen French frigates, carrying between 3,000 and 4,000 troops, were expected to be sailing for Java to frustrate the British attempt to capture the island, and that the securing of the island by the British was considered vitally important for the future of British operations in the East Indies. Heathcote decided to leave his station and deliver the despatches to Broughton. Despite Heathcote's motives, Broughton was dissatisfied with his conduct, and requested a court-martial from the commander of the British naval forces, Rear-Admiral Robert Stopford.

After examining the evidence, the court determined that the first two charges, that of a breach of the 27th article of war, and of disobeying orders, had been proved. The third charge, that of neglecting his duty by failing to escort a merchant fleet at the request of the Bombay government, was judged not to have been proved, and was dismissed. The board tempered their judgement by acknowledging that the breach of orders arose 'from a zeal for the good of his Majesty's service', and that the orders justified his conduct. Heathcote was therefore acquitted.

== Mediterranean service ==
Heathcote returned to Britain after this, and on 28 April 1812 was appointed to command the 74-gun HMS Scipion with the Mediterranean Fleet.

His commander, Vice-Admiral Sir Edward Pellew placed him in charge of the inshore squadron during the blockade of Toulon in Autumn 1813, and on 5 November 1813 he became involved in one of the last clashes with the French Mediterranean Fleet.

Strong gales in late October 1813 had forced both the British inshore squadron and the main battlefleet off their stations, and the French commander, Vice-Admiral Maxime Julien Émeriau de Beauverger, decided to make a sortie to exercise his fleet off Cape Sicié.

Heathcote, commanding four 74-gun ships, had recently arrived back on station and was observing the French movements. At 11:30 am the wind suddenly changed direction, shifting to the north-west.

Concerned about the sudden arrival of the British and unfavourable winds, Émeriau abandoned the exercises and ordered the fleet to make for Toulon. The advanced squadron of the French fleet, commanded by Rear-Admiral Julien Cosmao and consisting of five ships of the line and four heavy frigates, now found itself to leeward, beating back to port. Heathcote immediately saw a chance to cut off the French rear, and ordered his squadron to attack.

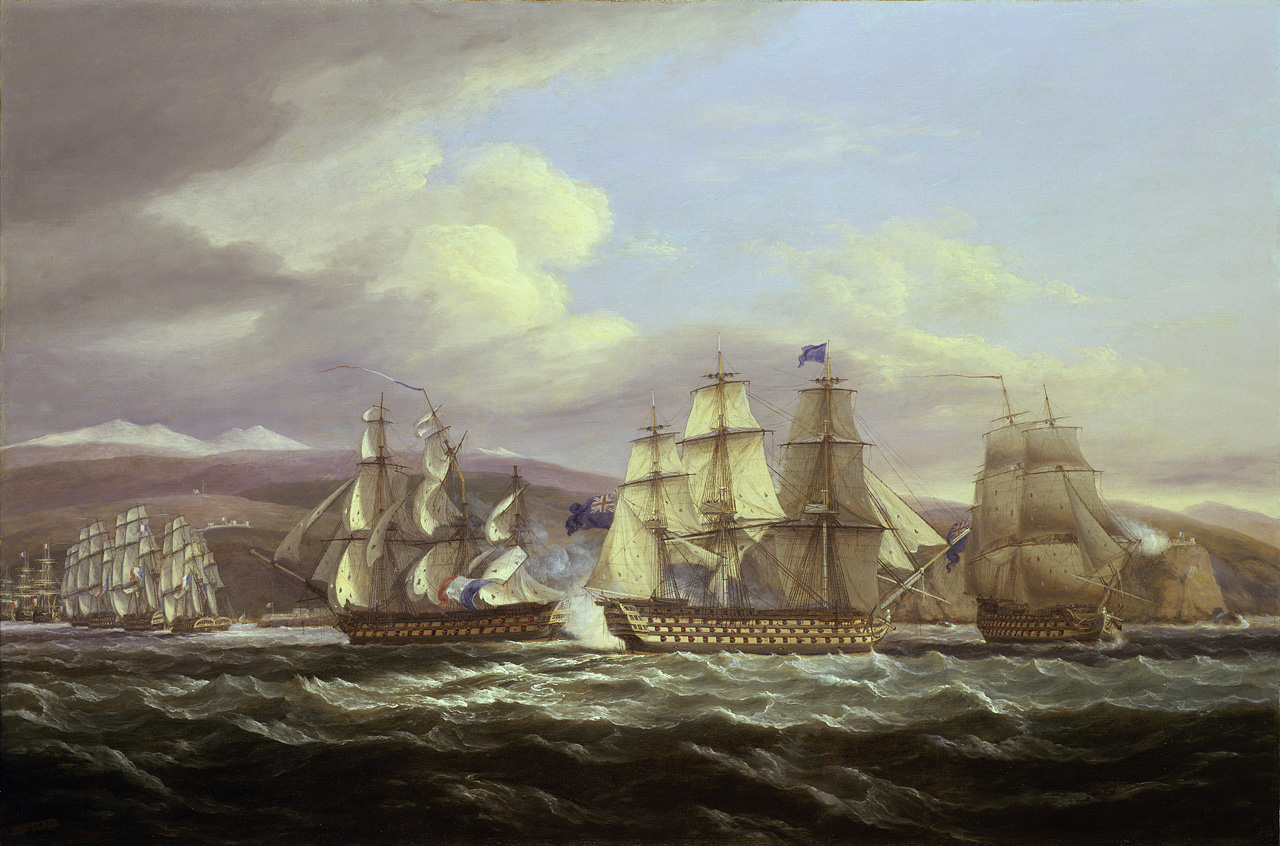
The Blockade of Toulon, 1810-14: Pellew's Action, 5 November 1813, Thomas Luny, 1830

Heathcote took his ship in and at 12:34 pm passed the French rear, firing on them with her port guns, as the French stood in for Toulon on the starboard tack. The rest of the squadron, joined by the 74-gun HMS Pompee from Pellew's fleet, followed in succession.

The British ships then turned about and tacked across in the opposite direction, cannonading the fleeing French with their starboard batteries. At 1:00 pm the advance ships of Pellew's fleet, HMS Caledonia, HMS San Josef and HMS Boyne arrived and opened fire on the rear-most French ship, the Wagram.

The British ships tacked and wore, exchanging fire with the French until the wind carried Cosmao-Kerjulien's squadron under the safety of the shore batteries covering the approach to Toulon. Casualties were light throughout both fleets, the only fatality during the action occurred aboard Heathcote's ship, when a seaman was killed in an accident. The only other casualty aboard Scipion was one man wounded by enemy fire.

With the end of the War of the Sixth Coalition, Heathcote was sent to Marseille with four ships of the line, to collect British prisoners of war from the port and convey them to Port Mahon.

== Family and later life ==
Heathcote paid off Scipion in October 1814 and had no further active seagoing service. He received a knighthood on 20 July 1819 and was promoted to rear-admiral in 1825. Further promotions followed, he was advanced to vice-admiral in 1837, and to a full admiral in 1846. He had married Sarah-Elizabeth Guscott on 10 November 1799. She predeceased him, dying on 19 October 1845.

By this time the couple had produced a large family. Their eldest child, Sarah-Frances Heathcote married Major-General Henry Somerset. Their third son, Thomas Hamilton Heathcote, entered service with the East India Company, and died a lieutenant at Bombay in 1824 at the age of 20. The couple had eleven children in total, at least one of whom followed his father into the navy.

In his retirement Heathcote devised improvements in the arrangement of staysails, taking out a patent in 1823, and publishing his theory in a treatise in 1824 entitled Treatise on Stay-Sails, For the Purpose of Intercepting Wind Between the Square-Sails of Ships and Other Square-Rigged Vessels, Mathematically Demonstrating the Superiority of the Improved Patent Stay-Sails, Recently Invented by Captain Sir Henry Heathcote. The work was reviewed by The Naval and Military Magazine, which came to the opinion that "However elaborate the diagrams, practical proofs must always be preferred on professional points; and, though the baronet [sic] is backed by Euclid, and assures his readers he is supported in his theory by the opinions of experienced officers, it is not too much here to assert, that the majority of both the new and old school will dispute the utility of staysails, in any shape, set 'upon a wind;' and few, it is presumed, will approve of the cut of Sir Henry's jib."

Despite this, Heathcote's obituary reported that 'the plan was tried aboard two frigates, and was reported by the Admiralty of being worthy of its acceptance.'

Admiral Sir Henry Heathcote died at Ingouville, France on 16 August 1851, at the age of 74.

== See also ==
- O'Byrne, William Richard (1849). "Heathcote, Henry" . A Naval Biographical Dictionary . John Murray – via Wikisource.

== Notes ==
a. The 27th article of war stated that 'no person shall sleep upon his watch, or negligently perform his duty, or forsake his station, on pain of death, or such punishment as a court-martial shall think fit to inflict.'

== Sources ==
- The Naval and Military Magazine. Vol. 1. T. Clerc Smith. 1827.
- Clarke, James Stanier; Jones, Stephen (1803). The Naval Chronicle. Vol. 10. London: J. Gold.
- Fremont-Barnes, Gregory (2007). The Royal Navy: 1793-1815. Oxford: Osprey Publishing. ISBN 978-1-84603-138-0.
- James, William (2002) [First published 1827]. The Naval History of Great Britain, 1488–1796. Vol. 1. Conway Maritime Press. ISBN 0-85177-906-9. OCLC 255340498.
- James, William (1837). The Naval History of Great Britain, From the Declaration of War by France in 1793 to the Accession of George IV. Vol. 3. Conway Maritime Press.
- James, William (1847). The Naval History of Great Britain: From the Declaration of War by France in 1793, to the Accession of George IV. Vol. 6. London: R. Bentley.
- Marshall, John (1824). Royal Naval Biography; Or, Memoirs of the Services of All the Flag-officers, Superannuated Rear-admirals, Retired-captains, Post-captains, and Commanders, Whose Names Appeared on the Admiralty List of Sea Officers at the Commencement of the Present Year, Or who Have Since Been Promoted; Illustrated by a Series of Historical and Explanatory Notes ... With Copious Addenda: Supplement. Vol. 2. London: Longman, Rees, Orme, Brown, and Green.
- Urban, Sylvanus (1825). The Gentleman's Magazine. Vol. 95. F. Jefferies.
- Urban, Sylvanus (1851). The Gentleman's Magazine. Vol. 36. John Bowyer Nichols and Son.
- Winfield, Rif (2007). British Warships in the Age of Sail 1793–1817: Design, Construction, Careers and Fates. Seaforth. ISBN 978-1-86176-246-7.
- Woodman, Richard (2005). The Victory of Seapower: Winning the Napoleonic War 1806–1814. London: Mercury Books. ISBN 1-84560-012-6.
