= Gilbert Heathcote (Royal Navy officer) =

Officer of the Royal Navy (1779–1831)

Captain Gilbert Heathcote
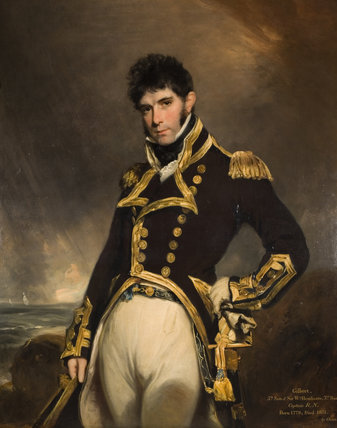
- Gilbert Heathcote in uniform, portrait by William Owen
- Born: 1779
- Died: 22 April 1831 (aged 51–52)
- Relatives: Sir William Heathcote, 3rd Baronet (father); Henry Heathcote (brother)
- Military career
- Allegiance: United Kingdom of Great Britain and Ireland
- Branch: Royal Navy
- Rank: Post Captain
- Commands: HMS Suffisante; HMS Cyclops; HMS Sir Edward Hughes; HMS Scamander
- Conflicts: French Revolutionary Wars Napoleonic Wars

Gilbert Heathcote (1779 – 22 April 1831) was an officer of the Royal Navy who served during the French Revolutionary and Napoleonic Wars.

Heathcote was born into a gentry family in 1779, the youngest son of a baronet. He and a brother entered the navy, with Gilbert reaching officer rank during the French Revolutionary Wars. He was promoted to his first command early in the Napoleonic Wars, but his ship was wrecked in a gale. His career survived largely unscathed however, and he commanded several more ships, reaching the rank of post-captain during a period of service in the East Indies, before his health obliged him to return to Britain. He undertook a final spell of active service in the closing years of the Napoleonic Wars in command of a frigate, before retiring ashore, and dying in 1831.

== Family and early life ==
Heathcote was born in 1779, the youngest son of Sir William Heathcote, 3rd Baronet and his wife, Frances. William Heathcote was Member of Parliament for Hampshire between 1790 and 1806, and had his seat, Hursley House, in that county. Gilbert's elder brother Henry, Sir William's fourth son, was also a naval officer, and would rise to the rank of admiral of the blue. Gilbert Heathcote joined the navy, and after some years of service, was promoted to lieutenant on 10 December 1799. A further promotion to master and commander came on 29 April 1802, and in 1803 he was appointed to command the 14-gun brig-sloop HMS Suffisante, taking over from Commander Christopher Nesham. Suffisante outfitted at Plymouth between July and September 1803, after which Heathcote took her to sea. His first command was short-lived; Suffisante was caught in a heavy gale, and wrecked on Spike Island, off Queenstown on 25 December 1803. Heathcote underwent a customary court-martial for the loss, at which he was reprimanded but not punished.

== Further commands ==
Heathcote's career does not appear to have been unduly affected by the loss of Suffisante, and by September 1804 he was in command of HMS Cyclops, the guardship at Lymington. He left her in January 1805 and appears to have been without a ship until he undertook a period of service in the East Indies. He was promoted to post-captain on 25 September 1806 and succeeded to the command of the 38-gun HMS Sir Edward Hughes, replacing Commander Hood Hanway Christian, who had commissioned her in 1805. Heathcote's health seems to have broken down while on this situation, as he left Sir Edward Hughes later that September to return to Britain, and was reported by The Asiatic Annual Register to be "returning to Europe for the benefit of his health." Commander Edward Ratsey, formerly of the 18-gun brig-sloop HMS Harrier, was appointed to replace Heathcote.^{[a]}

Heathcote's health had improved by 1813 to allow him to return to active service with the command of the newly built 36-gun HMS Scamander, which he took over in October that year. Heathcote was assigned to service in the English Channel, and was in command until mid-1815, when command passed to Captain Sir John Louis. Heathcote does not appear to have had any further active service. He married Ann Lyell at Southampton on 23 March 1809, and at some point had his portrait painted by William Owen.^{[b]} He died, still at the rank of post-captain, on 22 April 1831.

== Notes ==
a. The promotion and appointment of Ratsey to command Sir Edward Hughes created a vacancy for the command of the Harrier. The commander in chief of that part of the East Indies Station, Rear-Admiral Sir Thomas Troubridge, 1st Baronet, filled it by promoting his son Edward, formerly a lieutenant on his father's flagship HMS Blenheim, to the rank of commander, and giving him the Harrier. This proved to be a fortunate appointment for Edward, as the Blenheim disappeared in a gale the following year with the loss of Sir Thomas and her entire crew.

b. The Scots Magazine names her as Ann, John Marshall's Royal Naval Biography instead has Anne. Both describe her as the daughter of the late Charles Lyell, of Kinnordy, Angus. She was therefore the sister of Charles Lyell the elder, the botanist. Owen's portrait of Heathcote is now held in the collections of Birmingham Museum and Art Gallery.
