= Action of 5 November 1813 =

- Part of the Napoleonic Wars
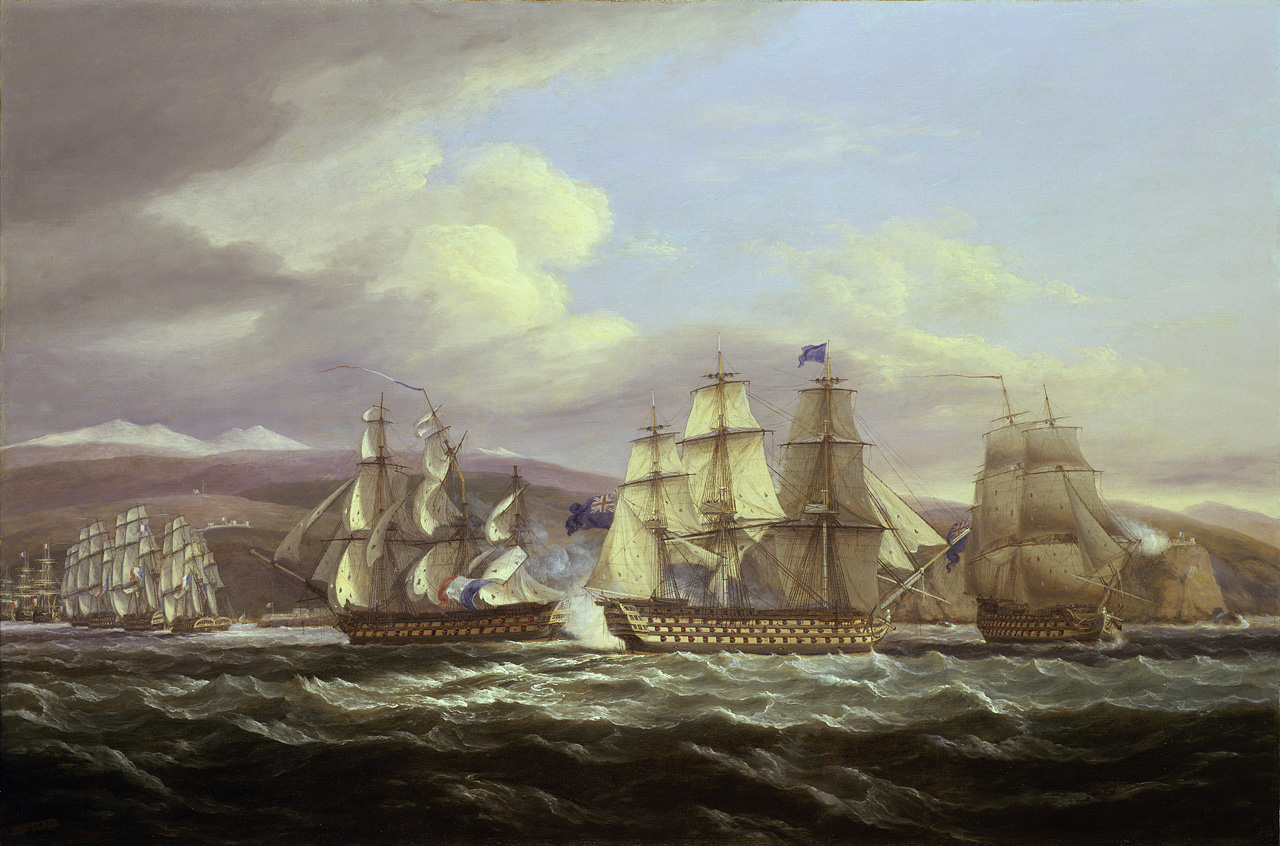
- 1830 painting of the action
Date	5 November 1813
Location	Off Toulon, Mediterranean Sea 43.0466°N 5.9841°E
Result	Inconclusive

Belligerents
United Kingdom	France

Commanders and leaders
Edward Pellew	Julien Cosmao

Strength
5 ships of the line 4 frigates	13 ships of the line 1 brig

Casualties and losses
1 killed 14 wounded	17 wounded

The action of 5 November 1813 was a brief naval clash during the Napoleonic Wars, between part of the British Mediterranean Fleet led by Vice-admiral Sir Edward Pellew, and a French force under Counter-admiral Julien Cosmao-Kerjulien. The engagement took place outside the French port of Toulon.

The clash occurred when a French fleet under Vice-admiral Maxime Julien Émeriau de Beauverger took advantage of a favourable wind and the temporary absence of the British blockading force, to leave port to carry out exercises. Émeriau abandoned the exercises when the wind changed, but while returning to port his rear came under attack from the recently returned British inshore squadron. The British attack was reinforced by newly arrived ships from the main fleet, but the French were able to escape into Toulon after exchanging cannon fire with the British. Casualties on both sides were light.

== Background ==
The French Mediterranean Fleet had been blockaded in their principal base at Toulon for several years. Their commander from early 1811, Vice-admiral Maxime Julien Émeriau de Beauverger made occasional sorties from the port in order to exercise his fleet, but preferred to avoid any chance of action with the patrolling British fleet under Vice-admiral Sir Edward Pellew. Émeriau instead preferred to make brief sorties when the wind was in his favour and the British were absent, undertake exercises, and then return to Toulon when Pellew's fleet appeared. Pellew in turn hoped to tempt the French out and then cut them off from their homeport, forcing a decisive battle upon them. To this end he kept the main part of his fleet, including his largest ships, some distance from Toulon, and relied on a small inshore squadron composed of 74-gun ships to maintain the blockade. Strong gales in late October 1813 had forced both the inshore squadron and the main battlefleet off their stations, and Émeriau decided to make a sortie to exercise his fleet off Cape Sicié.

The French fleet, consisting of between twelve and fourteen ships of the line, six frigates and a schooner duly put to sea at 9:30 am on the morning of 5 November.^{[a]} Émeriau, flying his flag aboard the Impérial, was assisted in his manoeuvres by a strong east-north-east wind and made for the usual exercise area. The British inshore squadron, commanded by Captain Henry Heathcote, had only arrived back on their station the night before, and the main British fleet under Sir Edward Pellew was some distance to the south. Heathcote, commanding four 74-gun ships, was observing the French movements, when at 11:30 am, the wind suddenly changed direction, shifting to the north-west. Concerned about the sudden arrival of the British and unfavourable winds, Émeriau abandoned the exercises and ordered the fleet to make for Toulon. The advanced squadron of the French fleet, commanded by Counter-admiral Julien Cosmao-Kerjulien and consisting of five ships of the line and four heavy frigates, now found itself to leeward, beating back to port. Heathcote immediately saw a chance to cut off the French rear, and ordered his squadron to attack.

== Action ==
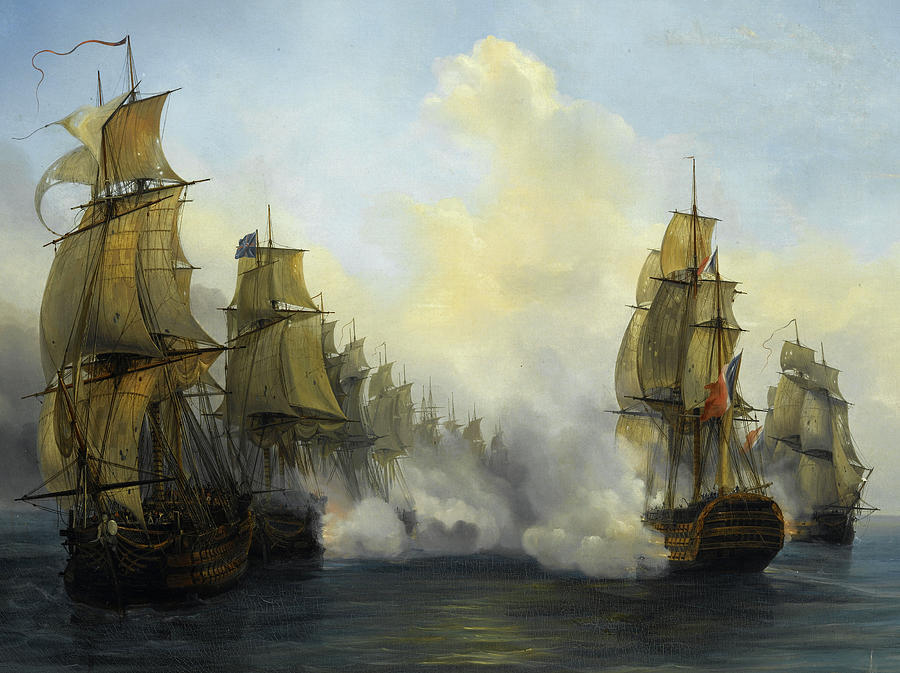
Painting of the action by Auguste Mayer

Heathcote, commanding HMS Scipion, took his ship in and at 12:34 pm passed the French rear, firing on them with her port guns, as the French stood in for Toulon on the starboard tack. The rest of the squadron, joined by the 74-gun HMS Pompee from Pellew's fleet, followed in succession. The British ships then turned about and tacked across in the opposite direction, cannonading the fleeing French with their starboard batteries. At 1:00 pm the advance ships of Pellew's fleet, HMS Caledonia, HMS San Josef and HMS Boyne arrived and opened fire on the rear-most French ship, the Wagram. The British ships tacked and wore, exchanging fire with the French until the wind carried Cosmao-Kerjulien's squadron under the safety of the shore batteries covering the approach to Toulon.

== Aftermath ==
Casualties and damage on both sides were light. On the British side, twelve men were wounded by French fire, while one man was killed and another two wounded in accidents, bringing total British casualties to 15. Caledonia sustained a shot to her mainmast and three or four in her hull, as well as some damage to her shrouds and backstays. Her launch and barge were also destroyed. The French had a total of 17 men wounded to varying degrees, mostly aboard the Agamemnon, which suffered damage to her masts, hull and rigging, and had nine men wounded. The Borée had her wheel shot away, and the frigates Pénélope and Melpomène were damaged in their sails, masts and rigging. Pellew sailed for Menorca soon afterwards, reducing the inshore squadron to a minimum, but Émeriau declined to come out.

== Order of battle ==
Admiral Pellew's Fleet
Ship	Rate	Guns	Navy	Commander	Casualties			Notes
Ship	Rate	Guns	Navy	Commander	Killed	Wounded	Total	Notes
HMS Caledonia	First rate	120		Vice-admiral Sir Edward Pellew; Rear-admiral Israel Pellew; Captain Jeremiah Coghlan	0	3	3	
HMS Hibernia	First rate	110		Captain Thomas Gordon Caulfield	0	0	0	Not in action
HMS San Josef	First rate	112		Rear-admiral Sir Richard King; Captain William Stewart	0	4	4	
HMS Royal George	First rate	100		Captain Thomas Fraser Charles Mainwaring	0	0	0	Not in action
HMS Boyne	Second rate	98		Captain George Burlton	0	1	1	
HMS Prince of Wales	Second rate	98		Captain John Erskine Douglas	0	0	0	Not in action
HMS Union	Second rate	98		Captain Robert Rolles	0	0	0	Not in action
HMS Barfleur	Second rate	98		Captain John Maitland	0	0	0	Not in action
HMS Pompee	Third rate	74		Captain James Athol Wood	0	2	2	
Inshore squadron
HMS Scipion	Third rate	74		Captain Henry Heathcote	1	1	2	
HMS Mulgrave	Third rate	74		Captain Thomas James Maling	0	0	0	
HMS Pembroke	Third rate	74		Captain James Brisbane	0	3	3	
HMS Armada	Third rate	74		Captain Charles Grant	0	0	0	
Casualties: 1 Killed, 14 Wounded, 15 Total

Counter-admiral Cosmao-Kerjulien's Squadron
Ship	Rate	Guns	Navy	Commander	Casualties			Notes
Ship	Rate	Guns	Navy	Commander	Killed	Wounded	Total	Notes
Wagram	First rate	118	France	Counter-admiral Julien Cosmao-Kerjulien; Captain François Legras	0	2	2	
Agamemnon	Third rate	74	France	Captain Jean-Marie Letellier	0	9	9	
Ulm	Third rate	74	France	Captain Charles-Jacques-César Chaunay-Duclos	0	2	2	
Magnanime	Third rate	74	France	Captain Laurent Tourneur	0	0	0	
Borée	Third rate	74	France	Captain Jean-Michel Mahé	0	3	3	
Pauline	Fifth rate	40	France	Captain Etienne-Stanislaus Simiot	0	0	0	
Melpomène	Fifth rate	40	France	Commander Charles Béville	0	1	1	
Pénélope	Fifth rate	40	France	Captain Edme-Louis Simonot	0	0	0	
Galathée	Fifth rate	40	France	Captain Jean-Baptiste Bonafoux-Murat	0	0	0	
Casualties: 17 wounded
Sources: James, p. 155.

== Notes ==
a. French accounts list the fleet strength as twelve ships of the line, Pellew in his report stated that there were fourteen.
