= Thomas Maling =

Thomas Maling may refer to:

- Simon Maling (Simon Thomas Maling, born 1975), New Zealand rugby union player
- Thomas James Maling (1778–1849), Royal Navy officer
