= French frigate Melpomène (1812) =

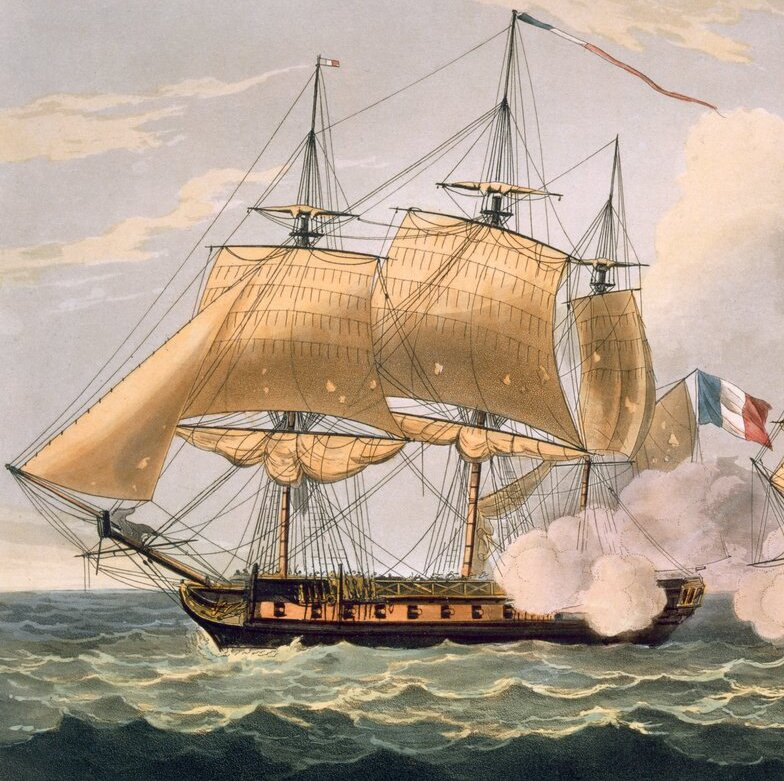
- Clorinde, a sister ship of Melpomène

History

France
- Name: Melpomène
- Namesake: Melpomene
- Builder: Toulon
- Laid down: 1811
- Launched: 17 May 1812
- Out of service: 30 April 1815

General characteristics
- Class & type: Pallas-class frigate
- Displacement: 1,080 tonnes
- Length: 46.93 m (154 ft 0 in)
- Beam: 11.91 m (39 ft 1 in)
- Draught: 5.9 m (19 ft 4 in)
- Propulsion: 1,950 m^{2} (21,000 sq ft) of sail
- Complement: 326
- Armament: Nominally 40 guns; In practice carried either 44 or 46 guns: Battery: 28 18-pounders; Quarterdeck & forecastle: 8 × 8-pounder long guns; 8 × 36-pounder carronades or 12 × 18-pounder carronades

United Kingdom
- Name: HMS Melpomene
- Acquired: 1815 by capture
- Fate: Sold 1821 for breaking up

General characteristics
- Tons burthen: 108710/94 (bm)
- Length: Overall: 152 ft 10 1/2 in (46.6 m); Keel:127 ft 0 7/8 in (38.7 m)
- Beam: 40 ft 1 1/4 in (12.2 m)
- Depth of hold: 12 ft 6 1/4 in (3.8 m)
- Propulsion: Sail
- Complement: 300
- Armament: Upper deck:28 × 18-pounder guns; QD:14 × 32-pounder carronades; Fc:2 × 32-pounder carronades + 2 × 9-pounder chase guns

Melpomène was a 44-gun frigate of the French Navy, designed by Sané. She was launched in 1812. In 1815 HMS Rivoli captured her. The Royal Navy never commissioned Melpomène and in 1821 sold her for breaking up.

== Career ==
Melpomène was commissioned on 1 June 1812 in Toulon under Commander Charles Béville. She took part in the action of 5 November 1813, where she sustained light damage and had one wounded.

She was decommissioned on 21 February 1814, but reactivated in January 1815 under Captain Joseph Collet, at Toulon.

On 24 April, during the Hundred Days, she was sent to Napoli to transport Letizia Ramolino. Six days later, at 6a.m. on the 30th, she encountered the 74-gun HMS Rivoli off Ischia, commanded by Captain Edward Stirling Dickson. After a 35-minute fight, Melpomène struck to the ship of the line.

Although a key French source states that Melpomène was scuttled, she was not. The Royal Navy sailed her to Portsmouth, where she arrived on 28 December 1815. There she was laid up. She was not commissioned and was not fitted for sea. She was sold on 7 June 1821 at Portsmouth to a Mr. Freake for £2,460.

In May, the frigate Dryade brought Ramolino to France, along with Prince Jérôme Bonaparte.
