= William Owen (painter) =

English painter (1769–1825)

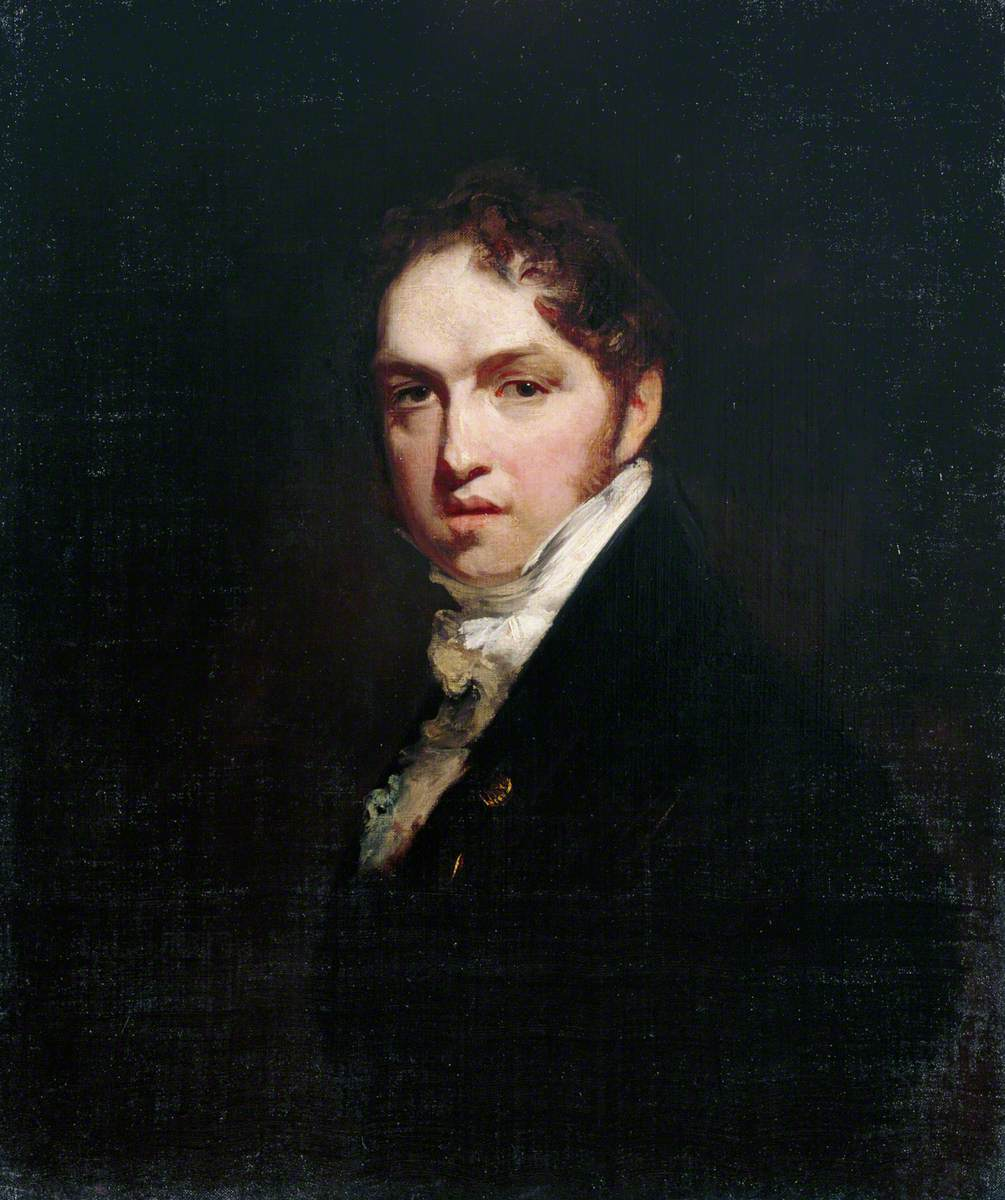
- Self-portrait, c. 1795–1805
- Born: 1769; Ludlow, Shropshire
- Died: 1825 (aged 55–56); London, England
- Education: Royal Academy of Arts

William Owen RA (1769–1825) was an English painter who specialised in portrait painting and was known for his portraits of prominent British figures such as William Pitt the Younger and George, Prince of Wales.

== Early life ==
William Owen was born at 13 Broad Street, Ludlow, Shropshire in 1769 and was baptised on 3 November in Ludlow Parish Church. Owen's father, Jeremiah Owen, had trained for the church but instead chose to follow in his father's profession and took over the family barber shop which he later expanded to sell stationery and books. Owen found his talent at a young age, and would frequently be found sketching the scenery of his surrounding area, his first identifiable work being a drawing of Ludlow Castle, which is thought to have been given to Margaret Maskelyne, Lady Clive (1735–1817).

== Career ==
In 1786 Owen moved to London, where he was apprenticed to the coach painter Charles Catton (1728–1798). This position was most likely arranged by his uncle, who was butler to the scholar and art theorist Richard Payne Knight, who lived near Ludlow. It appears that Owen was drawn to figure painting from the outset, and whilst still an apprentice, copied a portrait by Sir Joshua Reynolds of the much admired actress Mary Robinson (better known as 'Perdita'). it has been traditionally thought that this work is the painting currently on show at Petworth House. However there is no accurate record of the buyer in the 1825 sale, and doubt has been cast on the identity of the sitter of the portrait by Owen held at Petworth. Examination of the painting shows that it bears no resemblance to any known portrait of Robinson by Reynolds. Another possible reason to doubt the identity of the sitter is the woman's costume. Reynold's principle portraits of Mary were finished no later than 1784. The woman in the Petworth portrait wears an empire line dress, a fashion which only reached Britain in the late 1790s, well after the time of the Reynolds paintings. Despite the doubt surrounding the identification of Owen's 1791 painting of Mary Robinson, it was a turning point in Owen's career: Reynolds was so impressed by the copy of his own painting that he backed Owen's admission to the Royal Academy Schools in 1791.

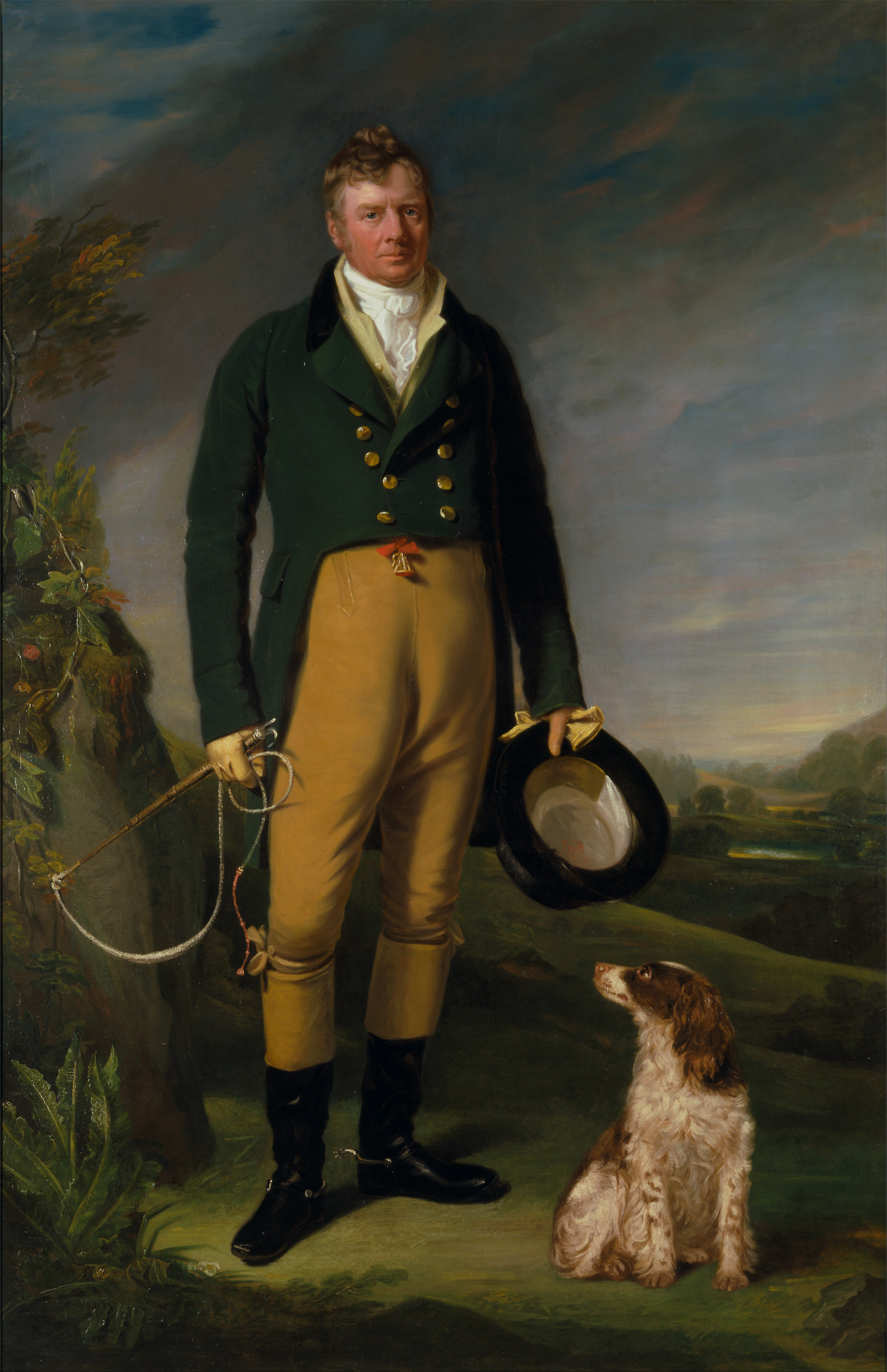
Portrait of a man

.

By 1794 Owen had moved out of his lodgings with Catton on Gate Street and into a new studio at No.211 Piccadilly where he remained for two years before moving to No.5 Coventry Street, Haymarket. It is whilst living here that he presumably came into contact with future wife Lener Leaf, whose father worked in Haymarket as a shoe maker.

By 1797 Owen was working as a studio assistant to John Hoppner, who by this point was struggling to keep up with the demand for copies of his portraits. Owen was clearly also experiencing some success in his own right, for in the same year he painted Lener, along with her younger sister, and exhibited the portrait at Somerset House – the then location of Royal Academy exhibitions, receiving a great deal of praise and encouragement. Owen married Lener later that year on 2 December and their son William was born soon after.

In 1800 Owen and his family moved to Pimlico, although choosing to maintain his recently acquired studio at No.51 Leicester Square, next door to the house in which Sir Joshua Reynolds lived. This remained Owen's studio until he became too ill and moved out in 1818. The year 1797/8 was perhaps the most significant in Owen's career as a painter; in 1797 he painted a portrait of the then Prime Minister William Pitt the Younger which he exhibited the following year along with a portrait of the Lord Chancellor Alexander Wedderburn.

== Royal appointment ==
In 1810, following the death of John Hoppner, Owen was appointed portrait painter to the Prince of Wales, later George IV (1762–1830). However, the prince never sat for Owen, and instead he had to rely on a number of head sketches by his Hoppner to create a likeness. In 1813 Owen was offered a knighthood, which he declined.

== Decline in health ==
In 1818 Owen left his house in Pimlico and his studio in Leicester Square and moved to Bruton Street, most probably due to his slowly declining health; his eagerness however remained unscathed and he exhibited eight works at the Royal Academy the following year. In 1819 Owen travelled to Bath to meet a respectable man of medicine named Mr Hicks, however this seemed to have no positive effect and he soon returned to London. By 1820 Owen was confined to his bed where, with the exception of a brief six months spent in Chelsea towards the end of 1824, he remained until his death five years later.

== Death ==
In 1825 Owen died after being accidentally poisoned by an overdose of 'Barclay's Drops' – a mixture of aniseed, camphor and opium. Owen was very ill at the time, being confined to his bedroom and unable to move his limbs, relying on a draught medicine to aid his recovery. When the draught ran out his cook was sent to fetch another bottle, along with a bottle of Barclay's Drops, however the chemist labelled the two bottles wrongly and as a result Owen took a fatal dose of the opium-based medicine, dying hours later. At the inquest on 13 March 1825 the following verdict was reached by the jury:

That the deceased, Mr. Wm. Owen, Esq,. died from taking a large quantity of Barclays drops; the bottle containing that liquid having been negligently and incautiously labelled, by the person who prepared the medicine as an opening draught, such as the said Mr. Owen had been in the habit of taking and that we understand the above lamented mistake took place at the house of Mr. Smith, a chymist and druggist in the Haymarket.

Owen was buried on 19 March 1825 at St Luke's Church, Chelsea, in a private ceremony attended by family and close friends, including Sir Thomas Lawrence, Sir Richard Westmacott, Thomas Phillips and 'Thompson' – most probably Thomas Clement Thompson.

Following his death, many of his unfinished portraits were completed by Edward Daniel Leahy.

== Gallery ==
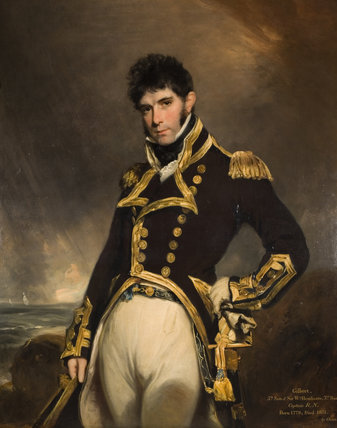
Gilbert Heathcote, c.1801-5

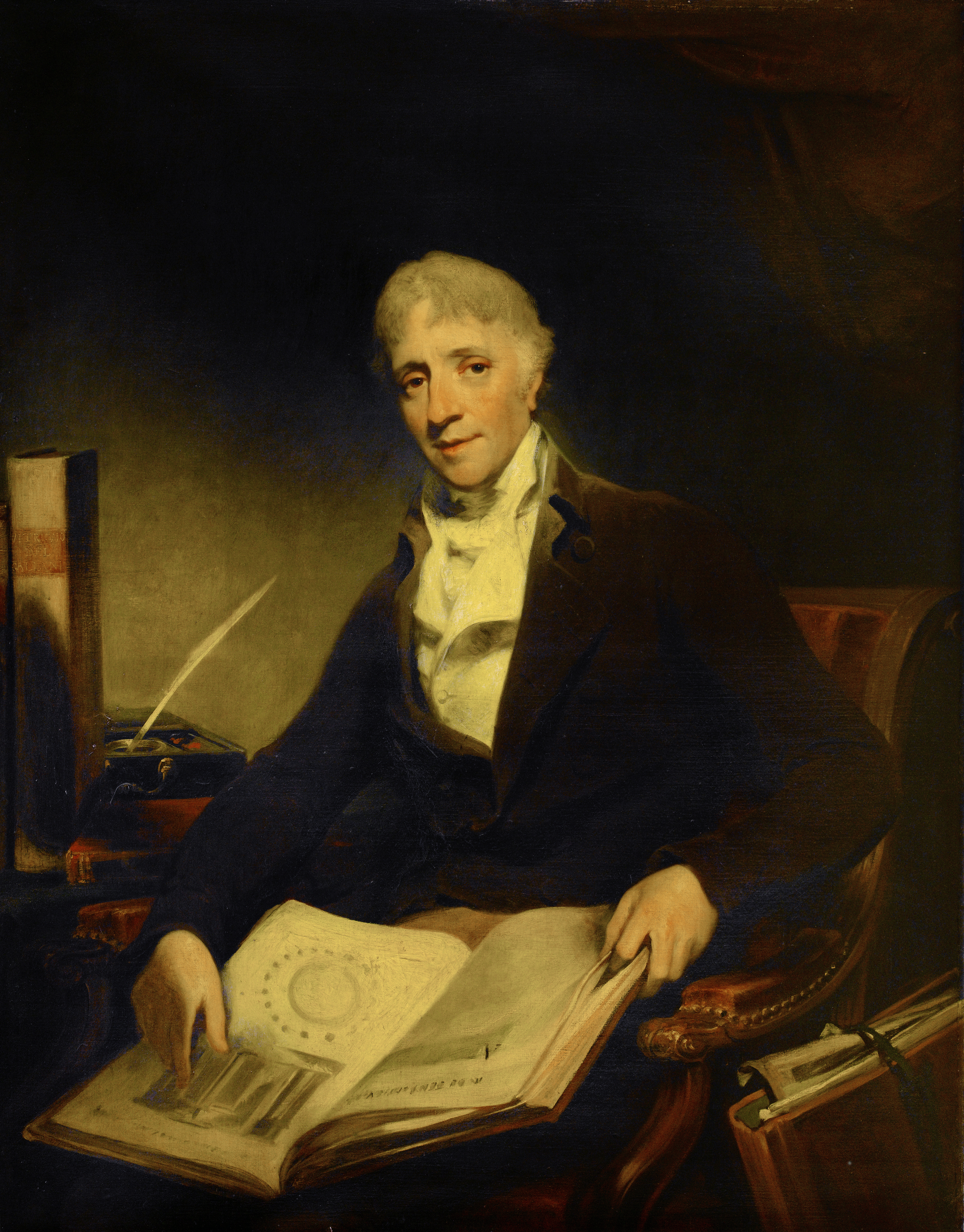
John Soane, 1804

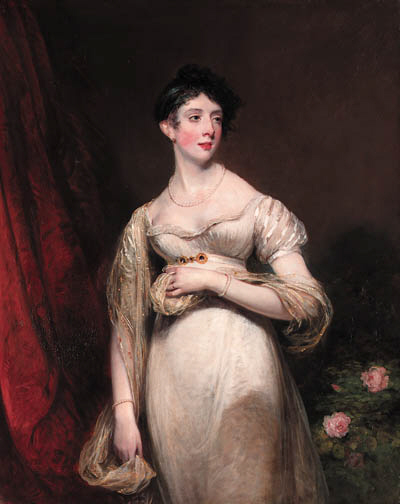
Emily Lamb, 1810

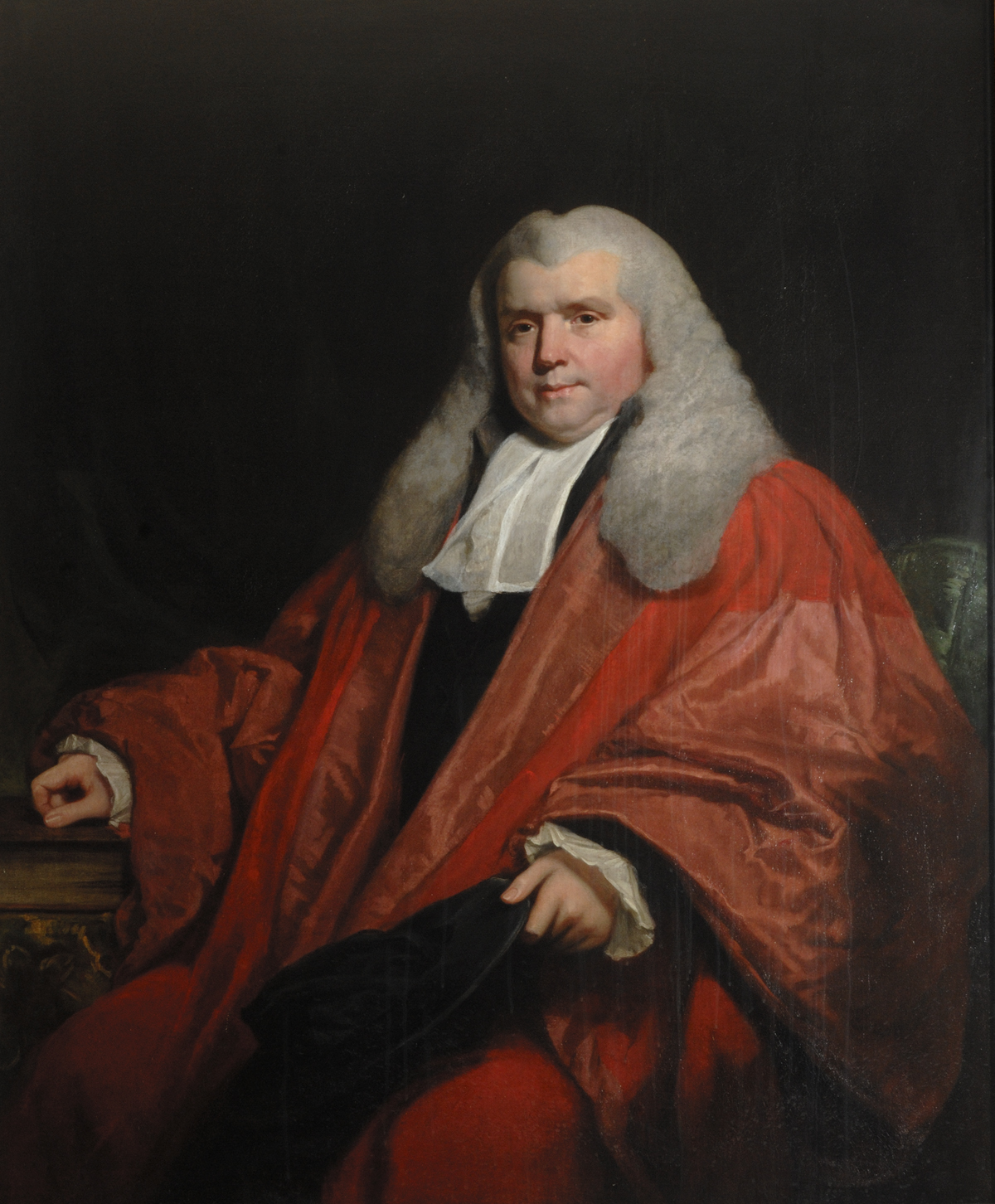
Sir Kohn Nicoll, 1810

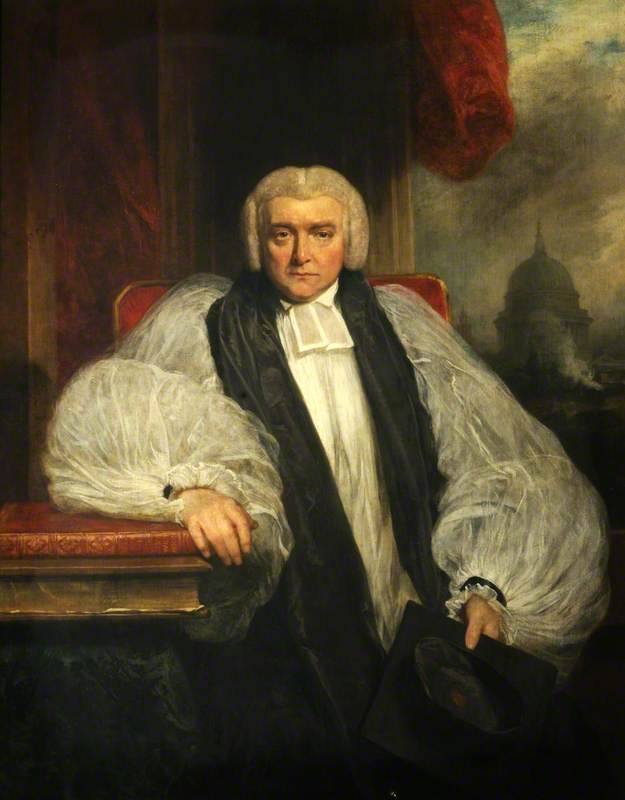
John Randolph, Bishop of London, 1811

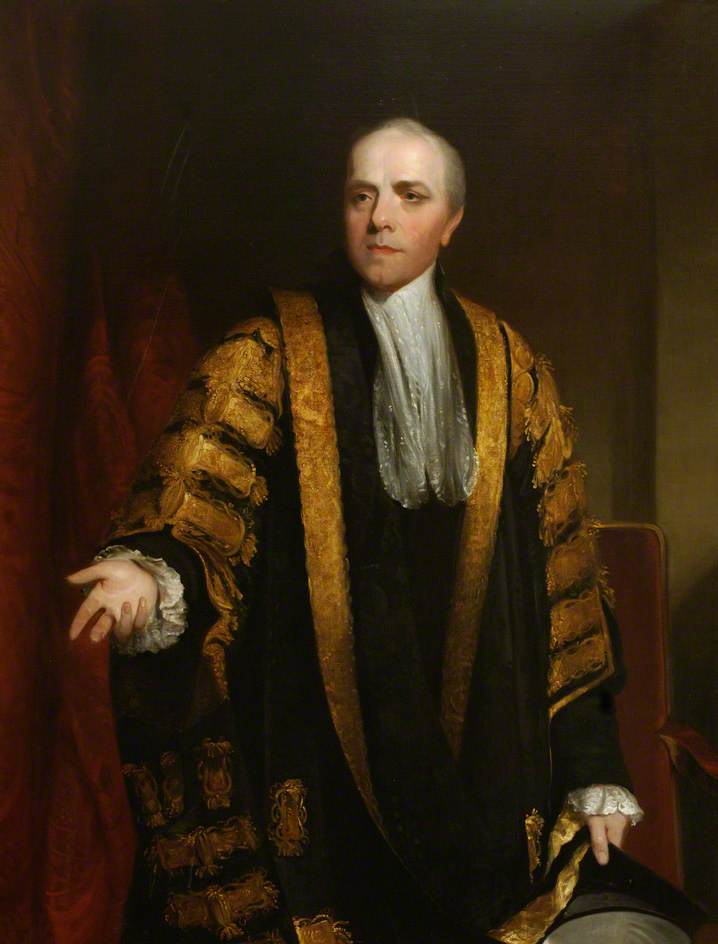
Lord Grenville, 1814

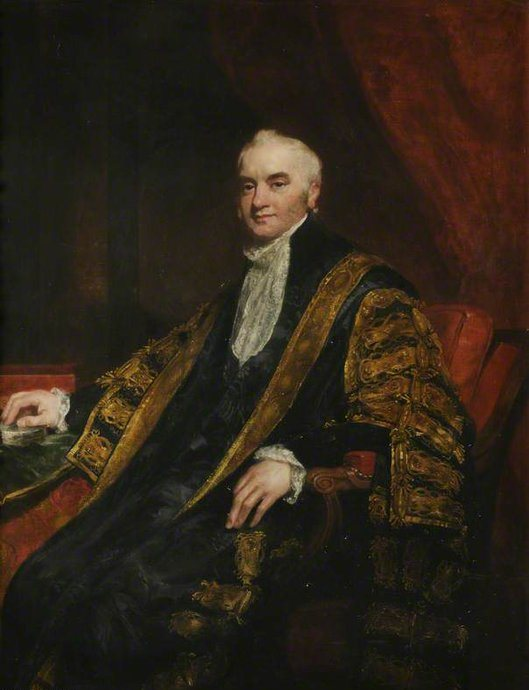
Nicholas Vansittart, 1815

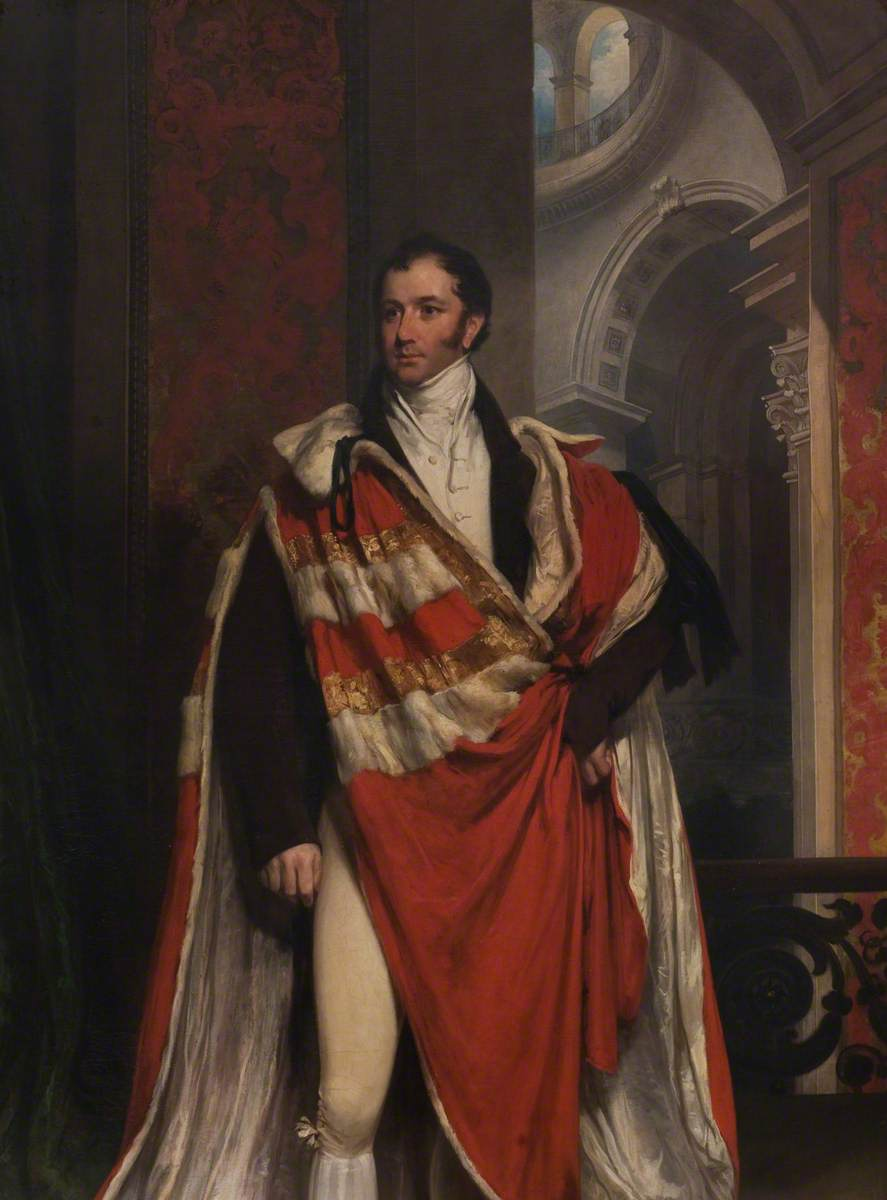
Archibald Kennedy, 1st Marquess of Ailsa, 1816

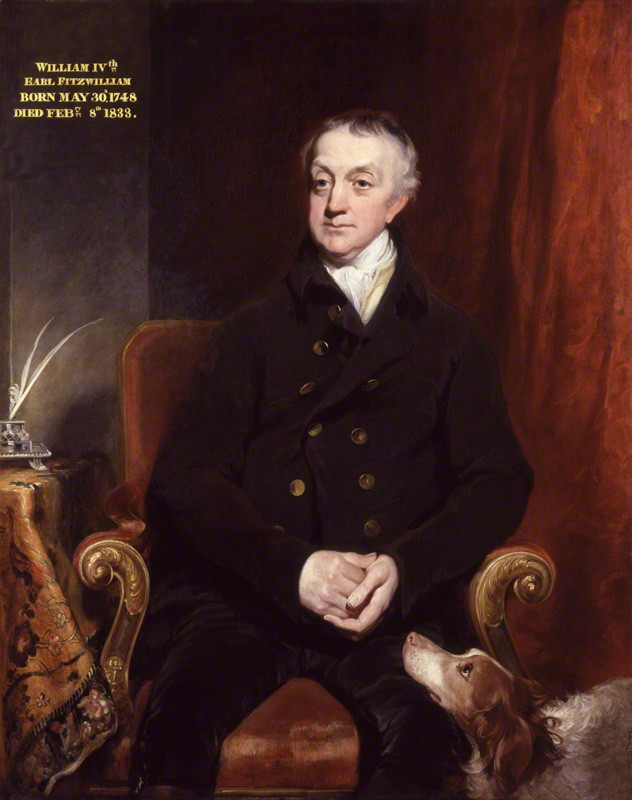
William Fitzwilliam, 4th Earl Fitzwilliam, 1817

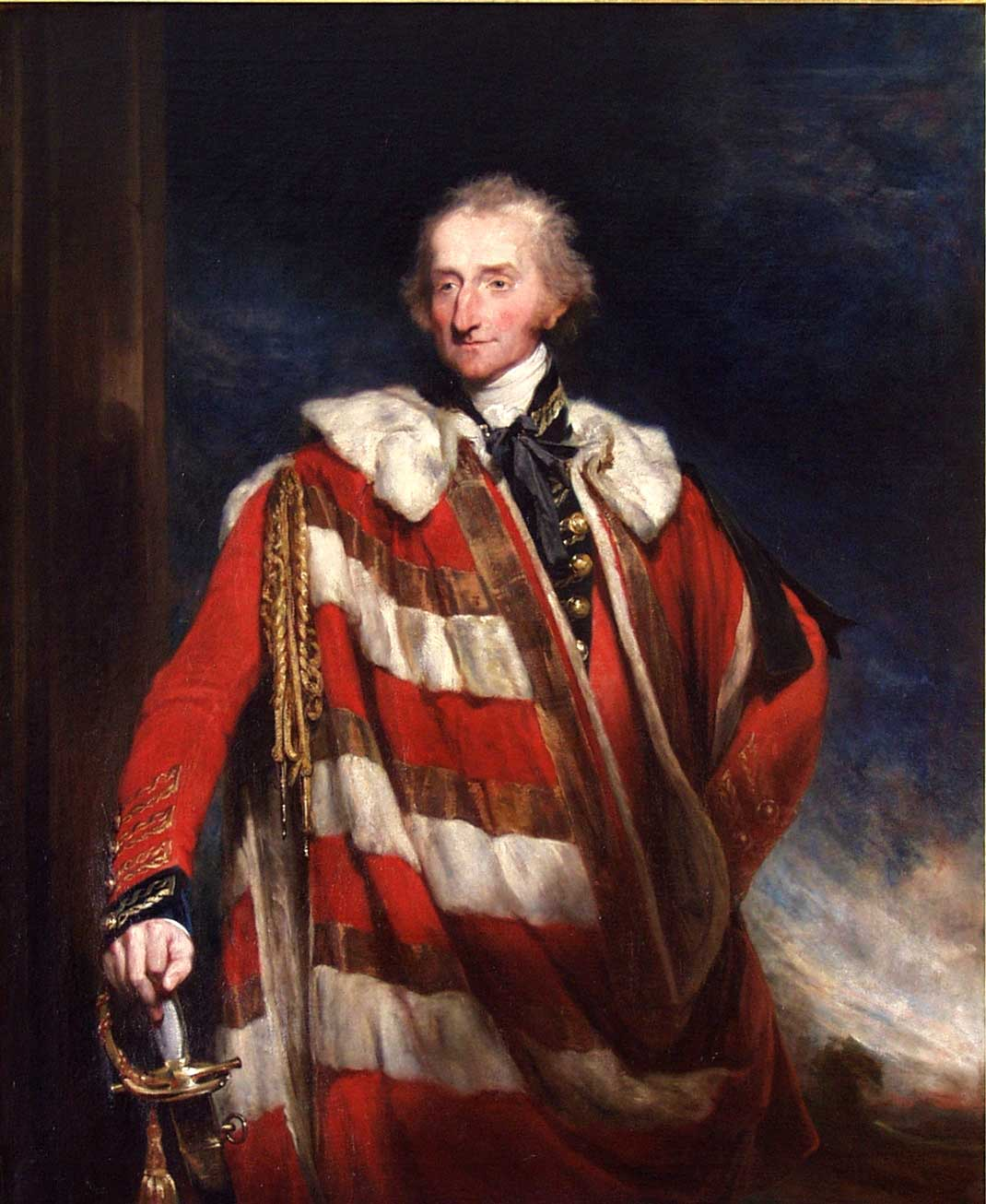
John Egerton, 7th Earl of Bridgewater, 1817

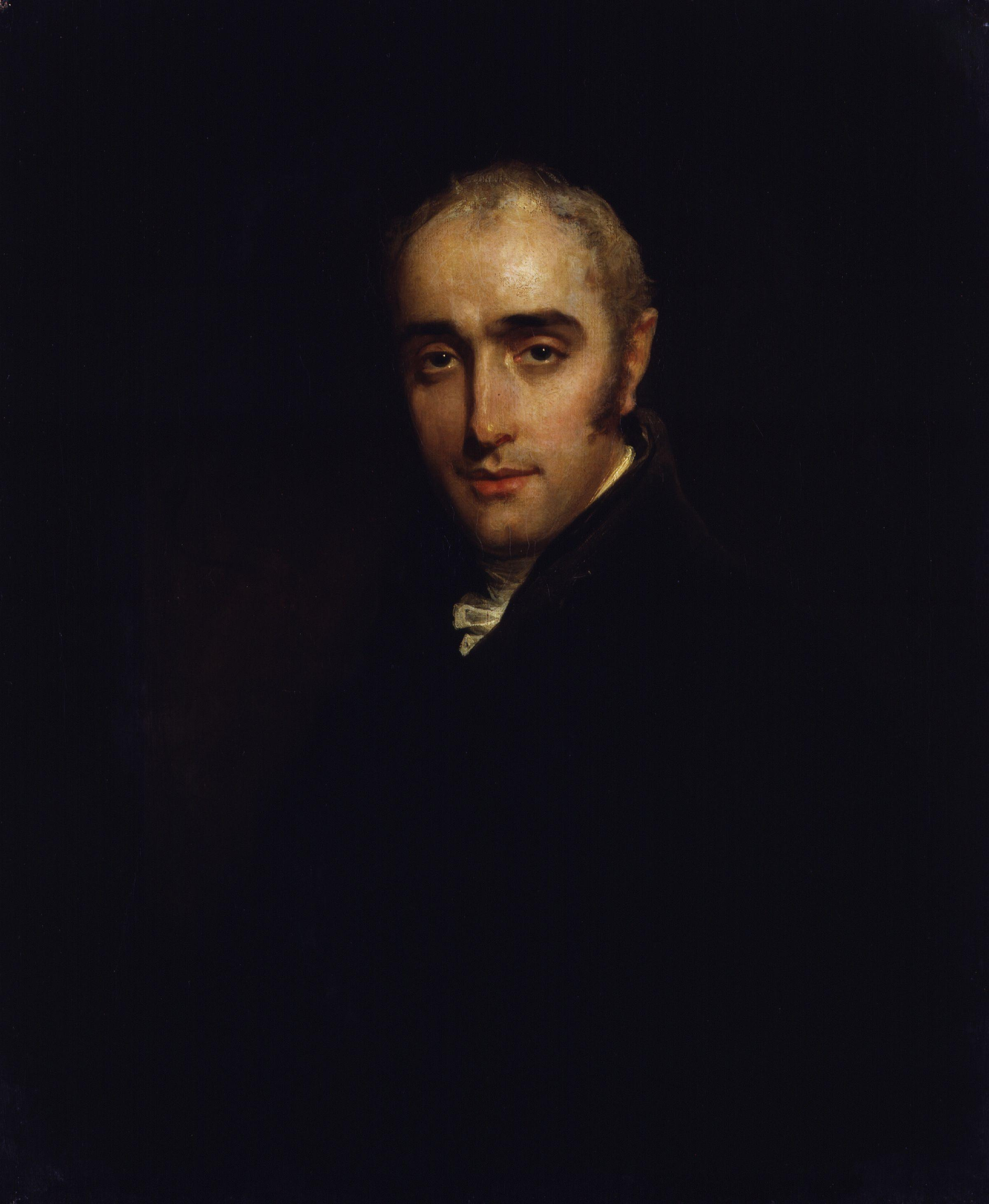
John Wilson Croker, c.1820

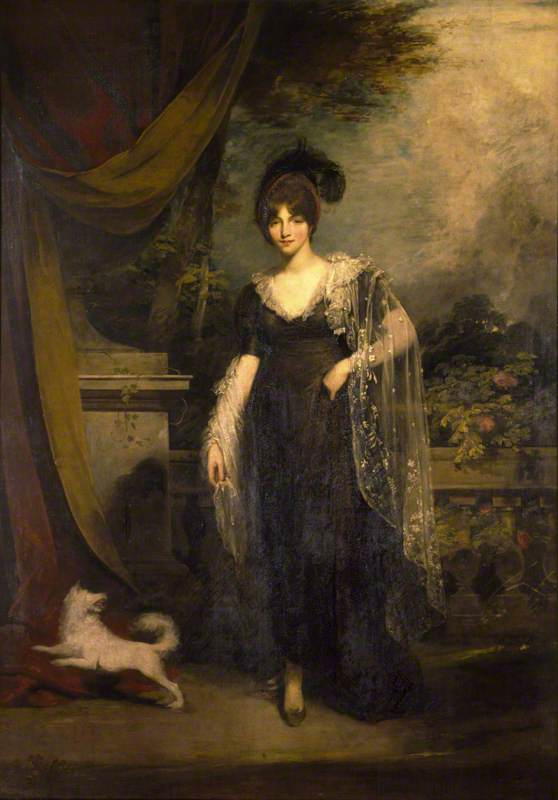
Mary Robinson, unknown date

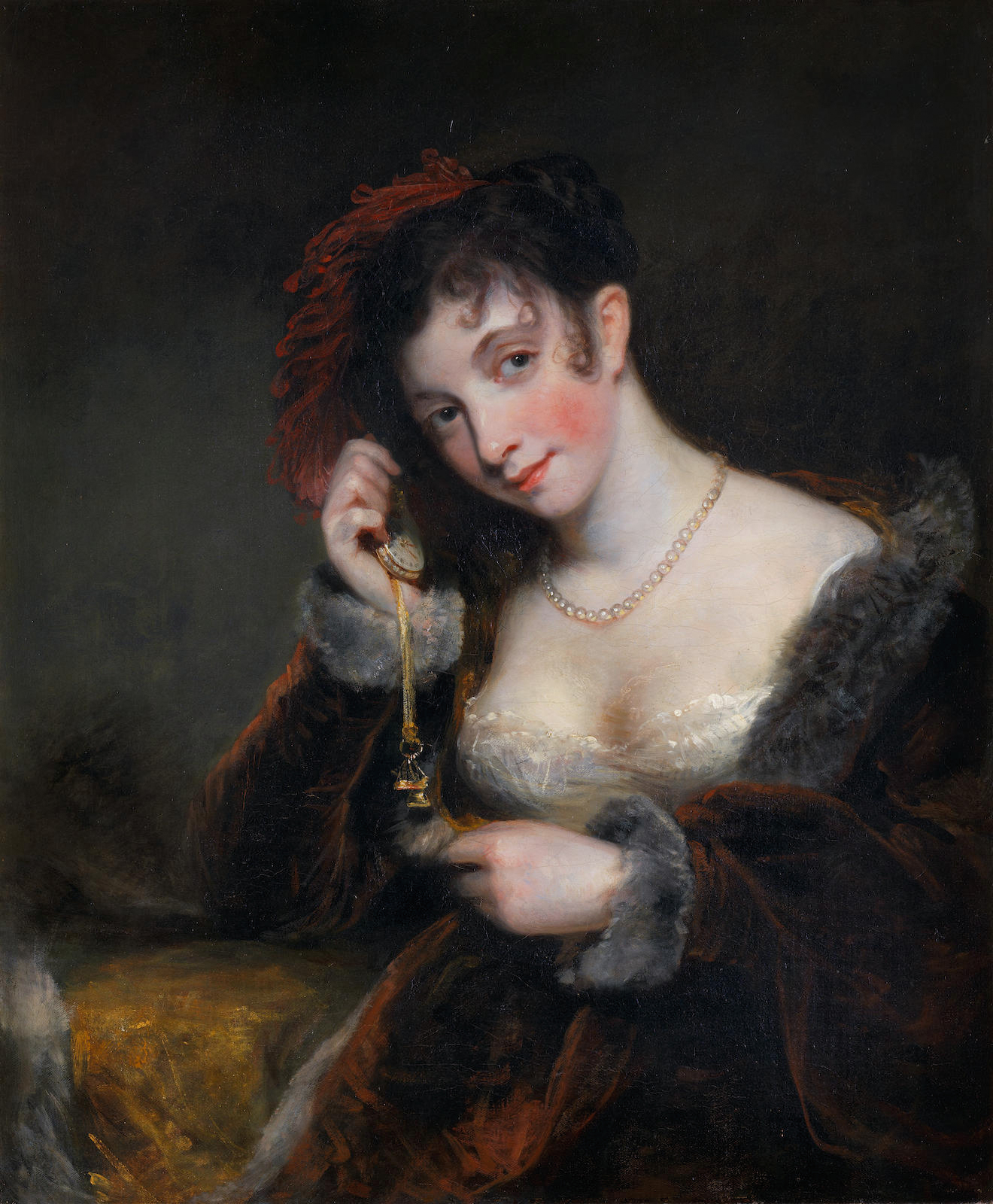
Emily St Clare, unknown date
