= Hired armed lugger Spider =

His Majesty's hired armed lugger Spider served the Royal Navy from 15 August 1795 to 4 April 1796. She was armed with eighteen 4-pounder guns and had a burthen of 172 51/94 tons (bm). She took part in one notable action before she was lost in a collision with the 74-gun Ramillies.

Spider's commander was Acting-Lieutenant James Oswald, and she served in the squadron under Admiral Adam Duncan off the Texel where she performed reconnaissance duties.

On 13 August 1795 Spider captured the "Neutral Vessel" Maria , suggesting that she was already on active duty in advance of the formal contract.

Two days later Oswald discovered the Dutch fleet some 9–10 miles NW of Camperdown, and reported that fact and the number and types of vessels to Duncan on 17 August. When Admirals Duncan and Pringle set out after the Dutch, together with a Russian squadron, they found that the Dutch had returned to port.

Spider's greatest moment occurred on 25 August. Spider sighted and engaged two French Navy brigs off the Texel until the squadron's larger vessels could come up. Once the French brigs had struck, Spider took possession of one of them.

One brig was Suffisante, of fourteen 8 and 6-pounder guns, and the other was Victorieuse, of fourteen 12-pounder guns. They were heading into the North Sea on a cruise.

French records show that Suffisante's captain was lieutenant de vaisseau Nosten, and state that her actual captors were the 74-gun third-rate Mars, the frigate Venus, and the lugger Speedy. Apparently, Suffisante exchanged fire with the 20-gun lugger Speedy, but the arrival on the scene of Mars and Venus rendered further resistance futile. (Note: There is no record of a lugger Speedy as a commissioned warship, a hired armed vessel, or a privateer or letter of marque. This is simply an error for Spider.) The Royal Navy took her into service as HMS Suffisante.

Victorieuse's commander was lieutenant de vaisseau Salaun. The captors of Victorieuse were Duncan's flagship Venerable, Mars, and a frigate. Victorieuse too joined the Royal Navy, becoming HMS Victorieuse and serving until broken up in 1805. Courts martial acquitted both Nosten and Salaun of the loss of their vessels. On 28 August Duncan wrote he had promoted Oswald to Lieutenant and confirmed him in command of Spider. Duncan's squadron, including Spider, shared the prize money, which was ready for payment in April 1796. In 1847 the Admiralty awarded the one surviving claimant from the action the Naval General Service Medal with clasp: "Spider 25 Augt 1795".

When Admiral Duncan rendezvoused in the Downs with his fleet, on 8 January 1806, Spider, Daniel Falara, master, was sent to Guernsey to smuggle articles for the fleet, such as wine, spirits, hair powder, playing cards, etc. When she arrived at the Downs she started to unload her contraband cargo for the various ships but a customs and excise boat, William Wallace, master, followed her in and seized her. Customs found crates addressed to Duncan, William Pitt the Younger, and Henry Dundas. A few days later Wallace was ordered to release Spider and her cargo or lose his job.

On 4 April 1796, Ramilies ran down and sank Spider. The fleet was tacking and Spider's master claimed that one of the larger ships had taken the wind out of her sails. Duncan, in writing of the loss, however, states that Oswald had run her aground in a chase. He further remarked that although Oswald would have to undergo the "Ceremony of a Court Martial for the loss of his Lugger", Oswald was a promising officer deserving of encouragement and further command. Oswald did go on to rise to the rank of post captain.
