= French ship Agamemnon =

Ship of the line of the French Navy

- Scale model of Achille, sister ship of French ship Agamemnon, on display at the Musée national de la Marine in Paris.

History

France
- Name: Agamemnon
- Namesake: Agamemnon
- Builder: Genoa, Italy
- Laid down: 1809
- Launched: 23 February 1812
- Renamed: Amphitrite 1824
- Stricken: 1836
- Fate: Hulked 1836

General characteristics
- Class & type: Téméraire-class ship of the line
- Displacement: 3,069 tonneaux
- Tons burthen: 1,537 port tonneaux
- Length: 55.87 m (183 ft 4 in)
- Beam: 14.46 m (47 ft 5 in)
- Draught: 7.15 m (23.5 ft)
- Depth of hold: 7.15 m (23 ft 5 in)
- Sail plan: Full-rigged ship
- Crew: 705
- Armament: 74 guns: Lower gun deck: 28 × 36 pdr guns; Upper gun deck: 30 × 18 pdr guns; Forecastle and Quarterdeck: 16–28 × 8 pdr guns and 36 pdr carronades

Agamemnon was a 74-gun Téméraire-class ship of the line built for the French Navy during the first decade of the 19th century. Completed in 1812, she played a minor role in the Napoleonic Wars, notably taking part in the action of 5 November 1813. During the Bourbon Restoration, she was razéed into a 58-gun frigate and renamed Amphitrite.

== Description ==
Designed by Jacques-Noël Sané, the Téméraire-class ships had a length of 55.87 metres (183 ft 4 in), a beam of 14.46 metres (47 ft 5 in) and a depth of hold of 7.15 metres (23 ft 5 in). The ships displaced 3,069 tonneaux and had a mean draught of 7.15 metres (23 ft 5 in). They had a tonnage of 1,537 port tonneaux. Their crew numbered 705 officers and ratings during wartime. They were fitted with three masts and ship rigged.

The muzzle-loading, smoothbore armament of the Téméraire class consisted of twenty-eight 36-pounder long guns on the lower gun deck and thirty 18-pounder long guns on the upper gun deck. After about 1807, the armament on the quarterdeck and forecastle varied widely between ships with differing numbers of 8-pounder long guns and 36-pounder carronades. The total number of guns varied between sixteen and twenty-eight. The 36-pounder obusiers formerly mounted on the poop deck (dunette) in older ships were removed as obsolete.

== Construction and career ==
Agamemnon was laid down in April 1809 in French-occupied Genoa, Italy, and launched on 23 February 1812. The ship was completed in August. Agamemnon was assigned to the Toulon squadron. She took part in the action of 5 November 1813 under the command of Captain Jean-Marie Letellier, and suffered the brunt of the French losses during the engagement, with nine wounded and damage to her masts.

In June 1822, she was transferred to Brest and the next year, she was razéed into a 58-gun frigate. The ship was recommissioned on 17 April 1824 as Amphitrite. In 1827, she cruised the Mediterranean under Commander Troude, taking part in the blockade of Algiers in October. She notably chased 11 ships from Algiers on 4 October, along with Galathée. Agamemnon was decommissioned in July 1829, but reactivated for the Invasion of Algiers. She was again decommissioned in November 1830, and hulked in Toulon in 1836.
