= Morgan Rattler (1793 ship) =

British and French privateer (1793–1796)

History

Great Britain
- Name: Morgan Rattler
- Namesake: Bawdy once-popular 18th century song called "Morgan Rattler"
- Acquired: 1793, by purchase of a prize
- Captured: 1793

France
- Name: Morgan
- Acquired: 1793, by capture
- Captured: 28 June 1796

General characteristics
- Tons burthen: 111, or 120 (bm)
- Sail plan: Brig
- Complement: 50
- Armament: Liverpool privateer: 14 × 3&4-pounder guns + 12 swivel guns; French privateer: 14 guns + 10 swivel guns

She was probably a French vessel launched under another name and taken in prize early in 1793, after the outbreak of the French Revolutionary Wars. She became a Liverpool privateer, but was quickly captured. A few years later she became a French privateer. She captured several British merchantmen before in June 1796, a British naval brig captured her and her prizes.

== Career ==
Morgan Rattler first appears in the journal of an Irish coastguard in 1790, who wrote "On the 4 Decr 1790 The famous Smuggling Lugger Morgan Rattler being anchored in Glassdrummond Bay with a number of Yawls alongside and astern with goods in each preparatory to landing. The Revenue pinnace was sent out, and a part of officers stationed on land to prevent a landing. In order to effect this purpose 16 men were despatched in the Lugger’s boat to chive off the Revenue land party and take the pinnace also — The Revenue party now opned a fire on the assailants who were not only deterred from their purpose when landed but cut off from their own boat. The Lugger now fired a Gun to cover her Men and she sent at the same time a reinforcement of 12 men who landed about half a mile north of the Revenue party and attacked them by firing in their rear. I moved towards the latter party leaving some of my people to protect our boat. During this movement, the Smugglers got their first party and boat to sea and the Revenue party being obliged to retreat before the 2d party of the Lugger’s men the landing was effected. My party fired some 10 or 12 rounds. The Smugglers were heard to say fire at the man on horseback meaning myself".

Morgan Rattler later appeared in Lloyd's Register (LR) in 1793.

Year	Master	Owner	Trade	Source
1793	W.Gibson	Cartwright	Liverpool cruise	LR

Captain William Gibson acquired a letter of marque on 25 May 1793. Morgan Rattler, Gibson, master, was reported in August to have been captured and taken into Lorient.

Morgan Rattler may have served the French Navy in 1794. Between April and July, the corvette Morgan was stationed at Bay of Bourgneuf under the command of enseigne de vaisseau non entrenu Collet. She then apparently became a privateer.

On 28 June 1796, HMS Suffisante captured Morgan. Morgan, under the command of John Coffin Whitney, was the former Morgan Rattler. (Note: One French source states instead that Morgan was a vessel captured from the British in March 1796. It describes her as sailing from an unknown port, having a displacement of 210 tons a crew of 100 men, and being armed with ten guns. However, Lloyd's List makes clear that the vessel that Suffisante captured was believed by its captor to be Morgan Rattler. Morgan Rattler, of 14 guns, taken off Brest, came into Plymouth on 30 June, in company with Suffisante.)

On 27 August, Suffisante intercepted and recaptured two British merchant ships near the Île de Batz. They reported that they had been sailing from Porto when a privateer of 16 guns and 10 swivel guns had captured them. When last seen the privateer had been north of Scilly in chase of some other merchant vessels. Suffisante immediately sent the recaptured vessels to Plymouth and sailed Suffisante to the French coast between Ushant and the Île de Batz in the hopes of intercepting the privateer on her return, or any prizes that she might have taken on their way to Morlaix or Brest.

The next morning Commander Nicholas Tomlinson, of Suffisante sighted the privateer and four prizes. He was able to capture the privateer by 1pm; Suffisante fired some small-arms fire at the privateer and she did not fire back, but instead struck. Tomlinson then put a prize crew on board the privateer, after taking off her captain and officers, and captor and ex-privateer set off after the prizes.

Suffisante recaptured not only the four prizes she had seen, but two others as well. The six merchant vessels were:

- Draper, 200 tons (bm), of Dublin, sailing from Porto to Dublin, carrying 400 pipes of wire and 11 bales of cotton (Draper's master was Maddock, or Maddox); (Note: Lloyd's Register describes Draper as being of 178 tons (bm), and launched at Southampton in 1778.)
- Brothers, 180 tons (bm), of Liverpool, sailing from Porto to Liverpool, carrying 350 pipes and 30 hogsheads of wine and 72 bales of cotton; (Note: One pipe of wine was equivalent to two hogsheads, each of 63 gallons.) (Note: Brothers, Cudd, master, of 157 ton (bm), had been launched in 1787 at Liverpool.)
- Mary Ann, 70 tons (bm), of Dublin, sailing from Porto to Dublin, carrying 272 pipes of wine, 11 bales of cotton, and five casks of vinegar;
- Ann, 170 tons (bm), of Dublin, sailing from Porto to Dublin, carrying 303 pipes of wine, 15 boxes and 10 baskets of lemons;
- Vine, 110 tons (bm), of Lancaster, sailing from Porto to Lancaster, carrying 108 pipes and four hogsheads of wine, 175 bags cotton, and three-and-a-half tons of cork, lemons, etc.; and
- Eliza, 160 tons (bm), of Dublin, sailing from London to Dublin, carrying 250 chests of tea, 250 barrels of porter, a quantity of steel, and other dry goods.

Suffisante and her seven prizes, sailed into Plymouth on 30 June 1796.

At the time these captures were considered highly important. The Committee for Encouraging the Capture of French Privateers etc. and the Court of Directors of the Royal Exchange Assurance, each voted Tomlinson a piece of plate valued at 50 guineas. (Note: The National Maritime Museum (NMM), Greenwich, is in possession of a tea-urn, part of a set that includes another smaller urn, a teapot, sugar basin and cream jug. The engraving on the urn in question states that the Court of Directors of the Royal Exchange Assurance awarded it to Lt. Tomlinson for his captures of Morgan and the six merchant ships. The NMM received the tea set as a gift from a descendant of Tomlinson.)
