= French brig Suffisante (1793) =

French (1793–1795) and Royal Navy (1795–1803) brig

Suffisante
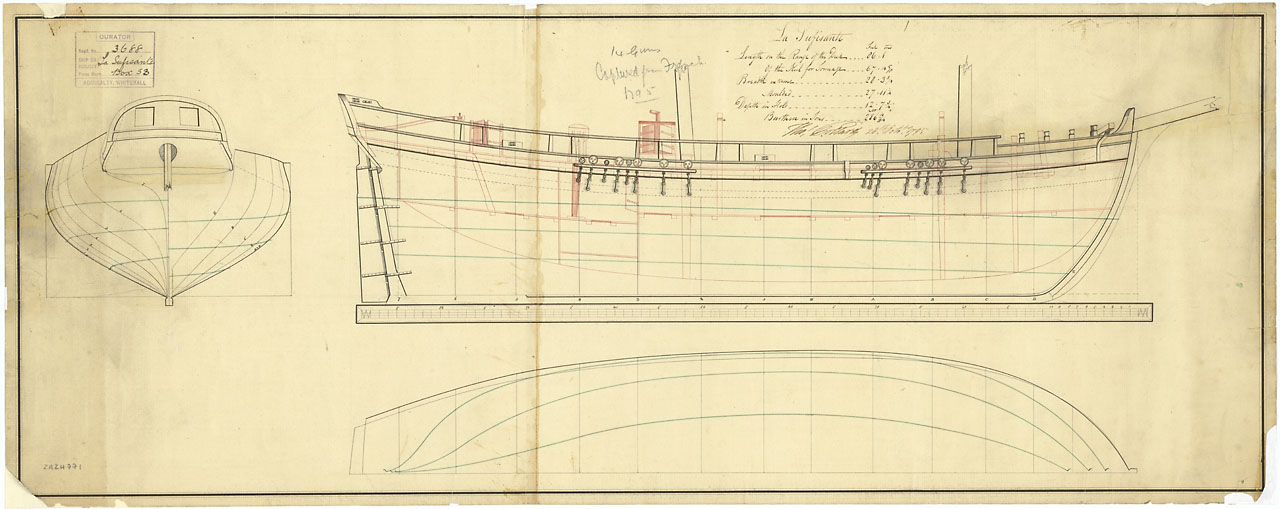
- Suffisante

History

France
- Name: Suffisante (or sometimes Suffisant)
- Namesake: French for "satisfying", or "vainglorious"
- Builder: Louis Deros, Le Havre Plans by Forfait
- Laid down: March 1793
- Launched: 2 September 1793
- Captured: 25 August 1795

Great Britain
- Name: HMS Suffisante
- Acquired: 25 August 1795 by capture
- Fate: Wrecked 25 December 1803

General characteristics
- Class & type: Amarante-class brig
- Displacement: 288 tons (French)
- Tons burthen: 286 4/94 (bm)
- Length: 86 ft 1 in (26.2 m) (overall); 67 ft 4 5/8 in (20.5 m) (keel)
- Beam: 28 ft 3 1/4 in (8.6 m)
- Depth of hold: 12 ft 7 3/4 in (3.9 m)
- Complement: French service:6 officers and 110 men; British service:86
- Armament: French service: 2 × 8-pounder and 10 × 6-pounders; in 1795: 10 × 6-pounders and 4 × 4-pounders; 12 × 12-pounder guns; British service: 14 × 6-pounder guns

The French brig Suffisante French pronunciation: [sy.fi.zɑ̃t] was launched in 1793 for the French Navy. In 1795 the Royal Navy captured her and took her into service under her existing name. HMS Suffisante captured seven privateers during her career, as well as recapturing some British merchantmen and capturing a number of prizes, some of them valuable. She was lost in December 1803 when she grounded in poor weather in Cork harbour.

== French service ==
Suffisante was built with copper sheathing, including the pegs. By 30 November 1793 Suffisante was under the command of enseigne de vaisseau non entretenu Berrenger and stationed at Le Havre. From there she cruised to protect the fishermen working between Dieppe and Cap d'Antifer. Between 9 February 1794 and 3 August now sous-lieutenant de vaisseau Berrenger sailed Suffisante on cruises, escorted convoys between Dieppe and Cancale, sailed into the Atlantic, returning to Rochefort, and then sailed from Rochefort to Brest.

Between 27 April 1795 and her capture, Suffisante was stationed at Flessingue and under the command of lieutenant de vaisseau Nosten.

== Capture ==
On 25 August 1795 the squadron under Admiral Adam Duncan captured two French Navy brigs off the Texel. One was Suffisante, of fourteen 8 and 6-pounder guns, and the other was Victorieuse, of fourteen 12-pounder guns. They were heading into the North Sea on a cruise.

French records state that Suffisante's actual captors were the 74-gun third-rate Mars, the frigate Venus, and the lugger Speedy. The French reports further state that Suffisante exchanged fire with the 20-gun lugger Speedy, but the arrival on the scene of Mars and Venus rendered further resistance futile. (Note: There is no record of a lugger Speedy as a commissioned warship, a hired armed vessel, or a privateer or letter of marque. Duncan mentions that the lugger Spider occupied the French vessels until the third rates could arrive. The vessel the French records refer to as Speedy was the 18-gun hired armed lugger Spider. In 1847 the Admiralty awarded the one surviving claimant from the action the Naval General Service Medal with clasp: "Spider 25 Augt 1795", for engaging two brigs and taking possession of one.e)

Victorieuse's captain was lieutenant de vaisseau Salaun. The captors of Victorieuse were Duncan's flagship Venerable, Mars, and a frigate. Victorieuse too joined the Royal Navy, becoming HMS Victorieuse and serving until broken up in 1805. Courts martial acquitted both Nosten and Salaun of the loss of their vessels.

== British service ==
The Royal Navy commissioned HMS Suffisante for the North Sea in November under Commander Nicholas Tomlinson, who had been promoted commander into her.

On 25 May 1796 Suffisante achieved the first of many captures. After a chase of eleven hours and a half-hour engagement, she captured the privateer brig Revanche in a single-ship action. The Bermuda-built Revanche was armed with twelve 4-pounder guns, and had a crew of 85 men under the command of lieutenant de vaisseau George Henri Dravemen. She had lost two men killed and seven wounded; Suffisante had only one man wounded. Revanche was five days out of Le Havre but had taken nothing. The capture required able seamanship as it took place among the rocks on the lee shore between Ushant and The Main.

In April she captured the American brig Maggy. This may have been an American vessel with contraband on board. Next, on 9 June Suffisante captured the privateer Patriote, a 12-ton ship with 12 men, Dupont, master.

On 25 June Suffisante captured the Danish brig Christian Severin, J. C. Lund, master. On 22 August Suffisante captured two vessels, Lucia, Boey Boeyson, master, and the dogger Jonge Pieter, Albert Jochems, master.

On 27 August Suffisante intercepted and recaptured two British merchant ships near the Île de Batz. They reported that they had been sailing from Porto when a privateer of 16 guns and 10 swivel guns had captured them. When last seen the privateer had been north of Scilly in chase of some other merchant vessels. Tomlinson immediately sent the recaptured vessels to Plymouth and sailed Suffisante to the French coast between Ushant and the Île de Batz in the hopes of intercepting the privateer on her return, or any prizes that she might have taken on their way to Morlaix or Brest.

The next morning Tomlinson sighted the privateer and four prizes. He was able to capture the privateer by 1pm; Suffisante fired some small-arms fire at her and she did not fire back, but instead struck. Tomlinson then put a prize crew on board the privateer, after taking off her captain and officers, and captor and ex-privateer set off after the prizes.

The privateer turned out to be Morgan, a 210-ton brig with 100 men and 10 guns. She had been captured from the British in March 1796. Suffisante recaptured not only the four prizes she had seen, but two others as well. The six merchant vessels were:

- Draper, 200 tons (bm), of Dublin, sailing from Porto to Dublin, carrying 400 pipes of wire and 11 bales of cotton (Draper's master was Maddock, or Maddox); (Note: Lloyd's Register describes Draper as being of 178 tons (bm), and launched at Southampton in 1778.)
- Brothers, 180 tons (bm), of Liverpool, sailing from Porto to Liverpool, carrying 350 pipes and 30 hogsheads of wine and 72 bales of cotton; (Note: One pipe of wine was equivalent to two hogsheads, each of 63 gallons.)
- Mary Ann, 70 tons (bm), of Dublin, sailing from Porto to Dublin, carrying 272 pipes of wine, 11 bales of cotton, and five casks of vinegar;
- Ann, 170 tons (bm), of Dublin, sailing from Porto to Dublin, carrying 303 pipes of wine, 15 boxes and 10 baskets of lemons;
- Vine, 110 tons (bm), of Lancaster, sailing from Porto to Lancaster, carrying 108 pipes and four hogsheads of wine, 175 bags cotton, and three-and-a-half tons of cork, lemons, etc.; and
- Eliza, 160 tons (bm), of Dublin, sailing from London to Dublin, carrying 250 chests of tea, 250 barrels of porter, a quantity of steel, and other dry goods.

At the time these captures were considered highly important. The Committee for Encouraging the Capture of French Privateers etc. and the Court of Directors of the Royal Exchange Assurance, each voted Tomlinson a piece of plate valued at 50 guineas. (Note: The National Maritime Museum (NMM), Greenwich, is in possession of a tea-urn, part of a set that includes another smaller urn, a teapot, sugar basin and cream jug. The engraving on the urn in question states that the Court of Directors of the Royal Exchange Assurance awarded it to Lt. Tomlinson for his captures of Morgan and the six merchant ships. The NMM received the tea set as a gift from a descendant of Tomlinson.)

At some point while Tomlinson was captain of Suffisante she captured the brig Bernon, and was involved in some capacity with the Spanish brigs San Joseph y Animas and San Rogue for which she "received money out of the registry of the High Court of Admiralty by virtue of His Majesty's warrant".

Tomlinson received promotion to post captain on 12 December 1796, whereupon Commander Josiah Wittman replaced him.

On 22 March 1797 Wittman and Suffisante set out to cruise off the Start. The next day they chased an armed brig to eastward of Peveral Point before she out-distanced them. As Suffisante was heading back to the west she encountered and captured the small French privateer cutter Bonaparte (or Buonapartie). Bonaparte was armed with 14 guns and was three days out of Saint-Malo without having captured anything.

A month or so later, on 21 April, Suffisante chased and captured Petite Hélène, (or Petit Helena), a French privateer lugger of two guns and 33 men. She belonged to Brest, but was last from Île de Batz and had not taken anything. Suffisante brought her into Plymouth.

On 20 May 1799 Suffisante and Harpy were in sight when Savage captured the ship Johanna Maria, Kroyer, master.

The French privateer Providence, (Note: She may possibly have been the 50-ton Providence from Saint-Malo, carrying sixteen 6-pounder guns and 80 men, then under Captain René Rosse. captured the Guernsey brig May on 3 December 1799, but Suffisante recaptured May off the Île de Batz. Suffisante then set off after Providence; however, there is no record indicating that Suffisante was successful in her quest. Next, Suffisante recaptured Giraldina, May, master, of Guernsey, and carrying a cargo of wines, that a French privateer had captured and that arrived at Plymouth on 19 December. On 29 January 1800, Suffisante and Havick were in the Channel together when Suffisante signaled to Havick to chase north. There Havick observed a ship, a cutter, and a lugger fleeing to the southeast. Havick captured the ship, which was the American vessel Strafford, of 16 guns and carrying a cargo of tobacco from Baltimore to London; she had been a prize to the two fleeing vessels, and Captain Bartholomew of Havick believed that her cargo was worth £30–40,000. Suffisante captured the lugger Courageux and the cutter Grand Quinola. Courageux was armed with four 4-pounder guns and one 18-pounder carronade, and had a crew of 42 men. Grand Quinnola was armed with 8-pounder brass carronades, two 2-pounder brass guns, two 2-pounder iron guns, and swivel guns; she had a crew of 47 men. The two privateers had left Saint-Malo together three days earlier. Havick and Suffisante shared the prize money with Centaur and the hired armed brig Fanny. Suffisante captured the privateer Joséphine (or Josephina), on 13 March. Joséphine, of four guns and 20 men, was under the command of John Francis Froment. (Note: Demerliac says under Jacques-Antoine Soubitez.) She was two days out of Morlaix and had taken nothing. Joséphine sank after her capture.)

On 25 March the Danish brig Maria, came into Plymouth. She had been sailing from Morlaix for Corunna, with linen and paper when Suffisante detained and sent her in.

In May Suffisante ("Sufficiante") detained three Dutch vessels: Anna Maria, Jusfrow Anna Catherina, and Seeks Geswisters.

On 3 September Suffisante and Havick encountered a French flotilla of 14 vessels carrying provisions and stores to the French fleet at Brest, and under the escort of the 18-gun fluyt (or corvette en flute) Salamandre, under Captain Conseil, and the gunboat Protectrice, under Guégun. The British engaged the French and drove them under the protection of shore batteries at Locquirec, near Morlaix. Fire from the batteries killed two men on Havick, and wounded two.

Harriet, Atkins, master, of Boston, from Isle de France via Boston, arrived at Plymouth on 23 July. She was carrying a valuable cargo for Rotterdam when Suffisante detained her.

On 12 September Suffisante came into Plymouth with a Danish galliot that had been sailing from Bordeaux to Emden with wines and brandies.

Suffisante, Renard, Spitfire, and the cutter Swift shared in the recapture on 13 December 1800 of the Defiance. Defiance had been sailing from Penzance to London when she was captured. (Note: That Defiance was from Penzance makes it likely that she was the brig of 70 tons (bm) launched at Neath in 1774. If so, her master and owner was J. Hosking.) Another prize money notice gave the name of Suffisante's captain at the recapture as Jonas Rose. If not a reporting error, Rose may have been temporary while Wittman was on leave.

On 18 January 1801, Duke of Kent, of Dartmouth, came into Plymouth. She had been returning from Newfoundland with a cargo of fish and cod oil when a French privateer had captured her. Suffisante recaptured Duke of York as she was going into Brest. Then on 4 February the Mont Blanc, a prize to Suffisante, came into Plymouth.

Suffisante and Spitfire shared the proceeds of the recapture of the brig Honduras Packet. Honduras Packet (or Honduras Planter), of eight guns and 16 men under the command of Captain J. Goodwin, had been sailing from London to New Providence. A French privateer, of fourteen guns and 125 men, captured her after an action of one hour and a quarter. Spitfire recaptured Honduras Packet on 18 February 1801 off Abervrac and she arrived at Plymouth four days later. Spitfire arrived the next day.

On 25 February Suffisante went into Barnpool to refit.

During 20 to 21 March a hurricane blew in the Channel. Even so, Suffisante, Spitfire, and Renard arrived safely in Jersey.

Suffisante shared with Garland and Renard, in the recapture on 3 April 1801, of the brig Swan. Suffisante also shared in the recapture around that same day of the William. William was a Newfoundland brig under the command of Wadland, master, that the French privateer Renard had captured. A boat from Dasher had cut her out from under the guns of battery at Île de Batz.

At some point while Wittman was still her captain, Suffisante captured Maria Elizabeth, Anna Maria, and Seeks Ges Wisten.

On 13 April 1801 Christopher John William Nesham was promoted to commander and captain of Suffisante, replacing Wittman, whose ill-health prevented him from continuing in command of Suffisante.

On 19 July Suffisante left Plymouth as escort to a convoy carrying livestock and vegetables to the Royal Navy squadron off Le Havre.

One month later, on 19 August, the cartel Betsey came into Plymouth with wounded men from Suffisante. A cutting out party from Suffisante had attempted to take an armed cutter in Morlaix roads when a Danish brig had given the alarm. Heavy fire ensued that forced the party to return to Suffisante with casualties. Betsey had sailed from Plymouth on 15 July with French prisoners that she was to deliver to Morlaix.

On 17 September a Danish vessel came into Plymouth. She had been sailing from Stralsund to Bordeaux when Suffisante had detained her. Four days laterGustavus Vasa, of Stockholm, arrived. She had been sailing from "Underwold" to Bordeaux when Suffisante had detained her.

In early January 1802 gales of wind had caused Suffisante to ship several heavy seas, nearly swamping her. One seaman was washed overboard and Nesham had been knocked down, but was unhurt. She had been obliged to batten down for 48 hours, with the result for that entire period the officers and crew had remained on the main and quarter-deck.

On 17 April Suffisante was back at Plymouth. She had carried discharged Irish seamen to Cork, landed them, and returned to Plymouth, all in three days and 14 hours. She then left for Dublin with another batch of discharged Irish seamen.

On 29 April 1802 Nesham was advanced to post captain. That same day, Gilbert Heathcote received a promotion to commander. He would later replace Nesham.

On 16 May Suffisante, still under Nesham's command, escorted into Plymouth Old Chatham, of 50 guns, from Falmouth. There she had served as a receiving and convalescent ship. She was in such poor condition that Suffisante was assigned to escort her for safety's sake. Old Chatham was sent up to Hamoaze to be paid off and broken up. (Note: Chatham was not then broken up; apparently she was a powder hulk at Plymouth in 1805, was renamed HMS Tilbury in 1810, and was broken up in 1814.)

On 3 July Nexham sailed Suffisante into the Hamoaze where she was to be laid up in ordinary. still, that month she may have undergone refitting while under the command of Commander A.R. Kerr.

After the resumption of hostilities between Britain and France in 1803, Suffisante was commissioned in July, under Gilbert Heathcote. She then underwent refitting at Plymouth.

On 30 October she captured Navigation, which came into Plymouth on 17 November. Navigation was a Dutch East Indiaman, sailing from Batavia to Amsterdam. She was said to be worth £16,000, and the richest ship yet captured from that settlement. (Note: A petty officer's share of the second and final payment on the hull and cargo was £107 0s 9¼d; a seaman's share was £40 12s 0¼d, or more than two years' wages.)

== Fate ==
One report states that she wrecked on 25 December 1803 in a violent gale off Spike Island, Queenstown, Cork. Seven of the crew drowned, and a falling mast killed another three. However, the court martial of Heathcote, his officers, and his crew, told a different story.

On 25 December Suffisante was in Cork harbour, waiting for wind and weather to change to permit her to sail. A local pilot came aboard and he moved her closer inshore. Heathcote permitted the pilot to leave; the pilot was to return the next day and take her out. Heathcote then went below. At 5pm Suffisante hit ground, increasingly strongly. The crew fired distress guns and boats from nearby vessels came, but the choppy seas prevented cables or anchors from being let out. The pumps were managing to keep the water that was entering from rising until sand clogged them. Water began rising rapidly and the crew was barely able to get the sloop's cutter overboard before she fell on her beam ends and sank.

Although the officers blamed the pilot for having left Suffisante in a poorly-chosen location, the officers had mishandled the situation. Lieutenant John Forbes should have taken the watch, but remained below, leaving a midshipman in charge. The master, John Coleman, had gone below for his dinner and left the pilot in charge of the positioning; Coleman stated that he was unaware that the pilot had gone ashore. Heathcote was below dining with his officers and unaware of the developing situation. The court martial found him partly to blame for the loss and reprimanded him but did not punish him. It also reprimanded Coleman, and sentenced Forbes to the loss of one year's seniority.

== Legacy ==
The plans of Suffisante, as reconstituted by the British, are available at the National Maritime Museum in Greenwitch.
