= French ship Ulm (1809) =

Ship of the line of the French Navy

- Scale model of Achille, sister ship of French ship Ulm (1809), on display at the Musée national de la Marine in Paris.

History

France
- Name: Ulm
- Namesake: Battle of Ulm
- Ordered: 31 July 1806
- Builder: Toulon
- Laid down: 2 March 1807
- Launched: 25 May 1809
- Decommissioned: 1828
- Fate: Broken up after June 1830

General characteristics
- Class & type: Téméraire-class ship of the line
- Displacement: 3,069 tonneaux
- Tons burthen: 1,537 port tonneaux
- Length: 55.87 m (183 ft 4 in)
- Beam: 14.46 m (47 ft 5 in)
- Draught: 7.15 m (23.5 ft)
- Depth of hold: 7.15 m (23 ft 5 in)
- Sail plan: Full-rigged ship
- Crew: 705
- Armament: 74 guns: Lower gun deck: 28 × 36 pdr guns; Upper gun deck: 30 × 18 pdr guns; Forecastle and Quarterdeck: 16 × 8 pdr guns

Ulm was a 74-gun Téméraire-class ship of the line built for the French Navy during the first decade of the 19th century. Completed in 1809, she played a minor role in the Napoleonic Wars. The ship was stricken from the navy list in 1828 and scrapped after 1830

== Description ==
Designed by Jacques-Noël Sané, the Téméraire-class ships had a length of 55.87 metres (183 ft 4 in), a beam of 14.46 metres (47 ft 5 in) and a depth of hold of 7.15 metres (23 ft 5 in). The ships displaced 3,069 tonneaux and had a mean draught of 7.15 metres (23 ft 5 in). They had a tonnage of 1,537 port tonneaux. Their crew numbered 705 officers and ratings during wartime. They were fitted with three masts and ship rigged.

The muzzle-loading, smoothbore armament of the Téméraire class consisted of twenty-eight 36-pounder long guns on the lower gun deck and thirty 18-pounder long guns on the upper gun deck. On the quarterdeck and forecastle were a total of sixteen 8-pounder long guns. Beginning with the ships completed after 1787, the armament of the Téméraires began to change with the addition of four 36-pounder obusiers on the poop deck (dunette). Some ships had instead twenty 8-pounders.

== Construction and career ==
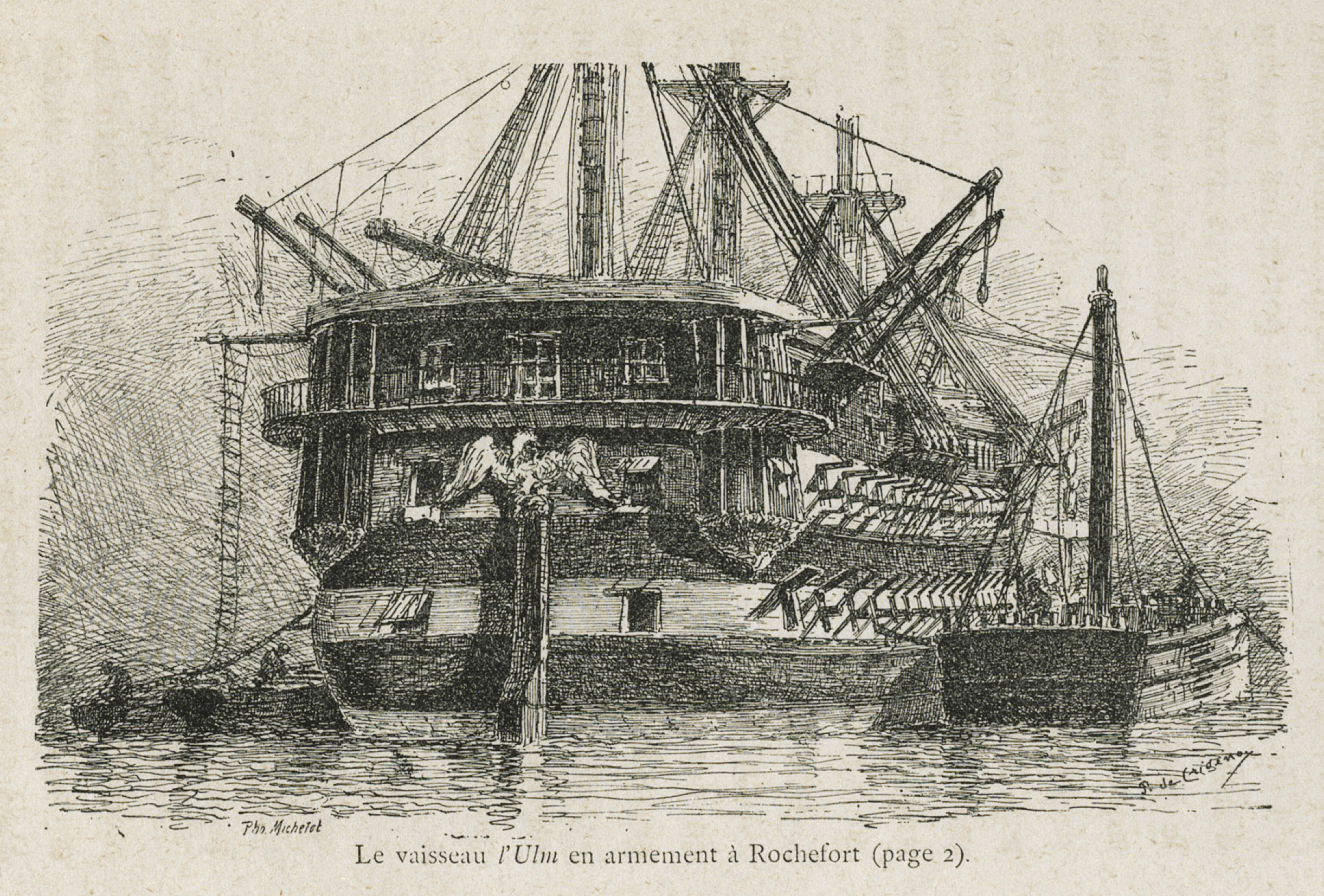
Ulm at Rochefort

Ulm was named on 31 July 1806 and ordered on 11 August. The ship was laid down on 2 March 1807 at the Arsenal de Toulon and launched on 25 May 1809. She was completed in August and commissioned on 28 August. Under Captain Chaunay-Duclos, Ulm took part in the action of 5 November 1813, where she sustained fire from the British squadron before disengaging. Ulm was decommissioned in 1814. The ship was refitted in 1822, struck in 1828 and hulked. She was broken up after June 1830.
