= French frigate Carthaginoise =

History

Malta
- Name: Sante Elisabeth
- Namesake: Elizabeth, mother of John the Baptist
- Builder: Valletta
- Laid down: 1782
- Launched: 1783
- Out of service: Surrendered to France in June 1798

France
- Name: Carthaginoise
- Namesake: Carthaginians
- Acquired: 12 June 1798
- Commissioned: September 1798
- Fate: Captured in 1800 and broken up

General characteristics
- Type: Frigate
- Complement: 32 guns

Sante Elisabeth was a 32-gun frigate of the Navy of the Order of Saint John of Malta, later brought into French service as the Carthaginoise (French pronunciation: [kaʁ.ta.ʒi.nwaz]; "Carthaginian" [feminine] or Carthagénaise), captured by the British at the capitulation of Malta in 1800, and subsequently broken up.

Built in 1782 in Valletta, Sante Elisabeth was launched the year after and served with the Maltese Navy until 11 June 1798 when the French captured the island during the Mediterranean campaign of 1798. The French recommissioned her as Carthaginoise, under the command of Captain Jean-Marie Letellier.

He readied her to sail to Alexandria, but found himself blockaded by the British Siege of Malta. Carthaginoise remained in harbour until Malta capitulated to the British in September 1800. The British found that she had been stripped for firewood and so they decided to break her up.
