= Jean-Marie Letellier =

French Navy officer

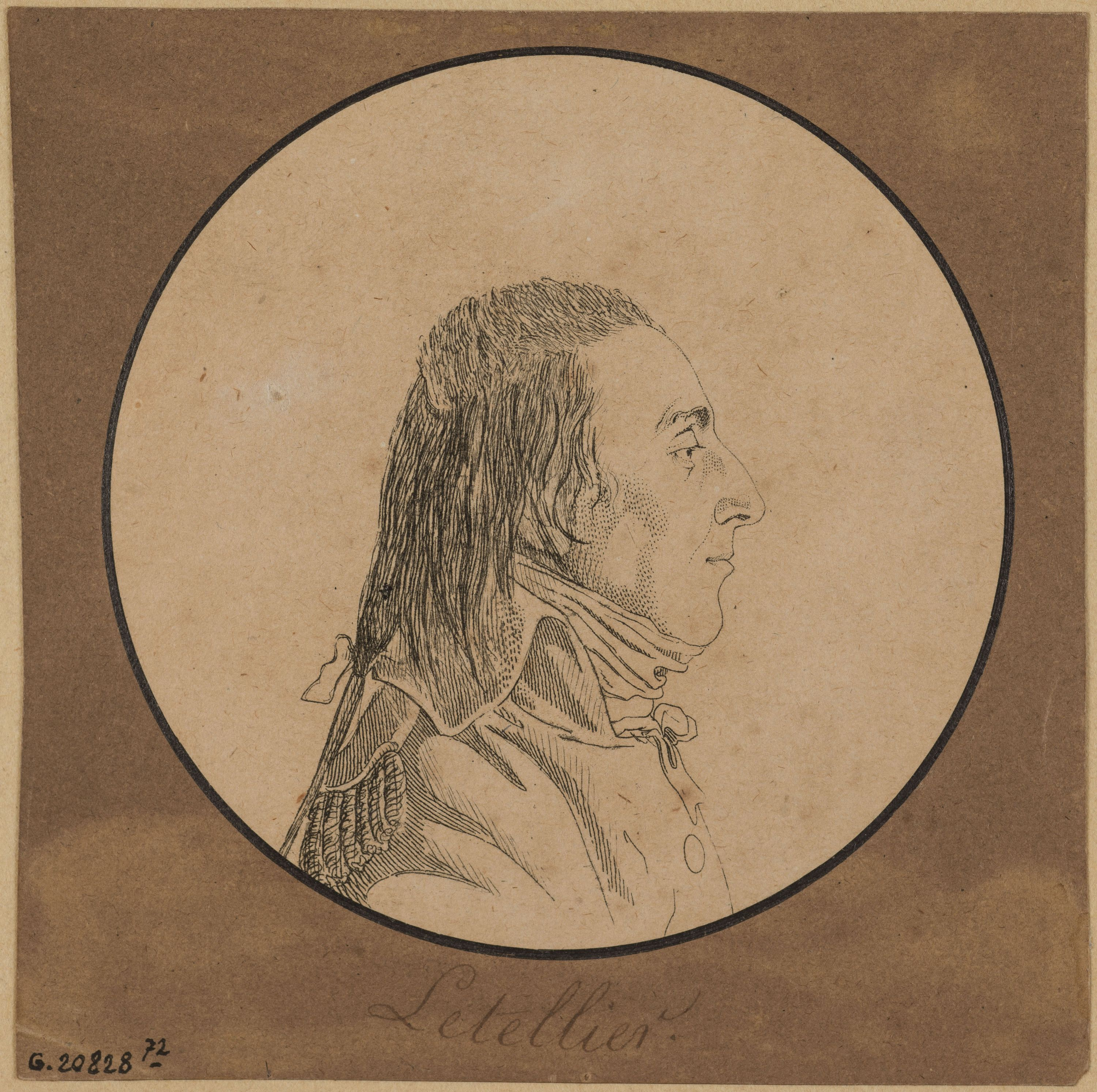
- Born: October 3, 1767; Brest
- Died: April 17, 1830 (aged 62); Alexandria
- Occupation: French Navy Officer

Captain Jean-Marie Letellier (Brest, 3 October 1767 - Alexandria, 17 April 1830) was a French Navy officer.

== Biography ==
Letellier joined the Navy at age 13 as an apprentice, and was severely wounded after a few weeks of service when the escort on which he sailed battled two privateers.

The next year, he volunteered on the frigate Bellone, which raided commerce off India. While at sea, he transferred to Suffren's squadron, and subsequently took part in the battles of Suffren's campaigns, serving on Coventry and Sévère.

Returned to Brest with the Illustre, Letellier sailed with the merchant navy until 1793, when he embarked on a privateer. In September, he joined the Navy with the rank of ensign on the Pomone and served aboard until the action of 23 April 1794, in which the frigate was captured and Letellier was taken prisoner.

Released and returned to Brest, he was transferred to Toulon to serve on Conquérant and on Orient from January 1796.

Promoted to commander in September, Letellier was appointed to Heureux and served in the Mediterranean campaign of 1798. After the captured of Malta, he was given command of the Cartaginoise, freshly captured at La Valette. He remained in harbour until the end of the Siege of Malta.

Returned to France, Letellier served in various harbours until he was appointed to the frigate Cérès. He then served as an aid to Pierre Dumanoir le Pelley, and was promoted to captain in September 1803. He was appointed to Dumanoir's flagship Formidable, taking part in the Battle of Cape Finisterre and in the Battle of Trafalgar.

He managed to escape the battle, but fell upon Admiral Sir Richard Strachan's squadron on 4 November 1805, resulting in the Battle of Cape Ortegal. The French ships had to strike their colours.

Letellier returned to France in 1806 and served ashore until 1811, when he was appointed to Agamemnon.

Letellier was retired in 1816, and left for Egypt where he served as an advisor to Ibrahim Pasha, though he stayed ashore during the Battle of Navarino, as staying on board Egyptian ships would have entailed facing the French Navy. He nevertheless retained his appointment afterwards, and supervised the harbour of Alexandria until his death in a boating accident.
