= Christopher Nesham =

Royal Navy Admiral (1771–1853)

Admiral Christopher Nesham
- Born: 1771
- Died: 4 November 1853 (aged 81–82)
- Military career
- Allegiance: Royal Navy
- Service years: January 1782-30 July 1852
- Rank: Admiral
- Commands: HMS Foudroyant; HMS Melville (74); HMS Suffisante (sloop); HMS Intrepid
- Conflicts: Battle of Camperdown

Christopher John Williams Nesham (1771 –4 November 1853), admiral, born in 1771, was son of Christopher Nesham, a captain in the 63rd regiment, by his wife Mary Williams, sister of William Peere Williams-Freeman, admiral of the fleet.

Nesham entered the navy in January 1782 on board HMS Juno, with Captain James Montagu, and in her was present at the action off Cuddalore on 20 June 1783. On his return to England in 1785, he was for some time aboard HMS Edgar, guardship at Portsmouth, commanded by Captain Adam Duncan, afterwards Lord Duncan, and aboard the frigate HMS Druid until March 1788.

He was then sent to a college in France, and was still there at the outbreak of the French Revolution. He was at Vernon, in Normandy, in October 1789, when a furious mob fell upon a corn merchant, Planter by name, who had been charitable to the poor, but who, having sent flour to Paris, was accused of wishing to starve the town. The town-hall, where he had taken refuge, was stormed, and Planter was dragged down the stairs towards the lamp-post at the corner of the building. Attempts were made to fasten a rope round his neck. Nesham, however, with two others, remained by Planter and warded off the blows aimed at him as well as themselves. Knocked down, Nesham sprang up again and vigorously resisted the mob. Planter was at length got away from the lamp-post into an adjoining street, and, a door being thrown open, was finally pushed in and saved. One of the first acts of the municipality on the restoration of order was to confer citizenship on Nesham (17 November). He was shortly afterwards summoned to Paris, January 1790, when he was presented by the assembly with a uniform sword of the national guard, and a civic crown was placed on his head.

In June 1790 he was appointed to HMS Salisbury, bearing the flag of Vice-admiral Milbanke, who had, as his flag-captain, Edward Pellew, afterwards Viscount Exmouth. On 17 November 1790 he was promoted to be lieutenant, and during the next two years served in the Channel Fleet under the immediate command of Keats and Robert Moorsom. In 1793 he was appointed to the 50-gun HMS Adamant, in which he served on the West Indian, Newfoundland, and home stations. In 1797 he was her first lieutenant in the North Sea, when, during the mutiny and through the summer, she carried the flag of Vice-admiral Richard Onslow. She afterwards took part in the battle of Camperdown. He was next, 13 April 1801, invested with the command (which he retained until posted 29 April 1802 of the sloop HMS Suffisante.

On 29 April 1802 he was advanced to post rank, and from October 1804 to February 1805 was captain of HMS Foudroyant, in the Bay of Biscay, with the flag of his kinsman and connection, Rear-admiral Sir Thomas Graves. In March 1807 he was appointed to HMS Ulysses of 44 guns, which he took out to the West Indies, and commanded at the reduction of Marie Galante, in March 1808. In July 1808 he was moved into HMS Intrepid of 64 guns, and in her, in the following February, took part in the capture of Martinique, where he served on shore under the immediate command of Commodore Sir George Cockburn, and superintended the transport of the heavy guns and mortars. On 15 April 1809 the Intrepid suffered severely in an unsuccessful attack on two French frigates under the guns of Fort Mathilde of Guadeloupe; and in December she returned to England and was paid off.

In 1830–1 Nesham commanded HMS Melville of 74 guns, in the Mediterranean. He retired as a rear-admiral on 10 January 1837, but was replaced on the active list on 17 August 1840. He became vice-admiral on 9 November 1846, and admiral on 30 July 1852. He died at Exmouth on 4 November 1853, aged 82.

Nesham was twice married: first, in 1802, to his cousin, Margaret Anne, youngest daughter of Thomas, first lord Graves; she died in 1808; secondly, in 1833, to Elizabeth, youngest daughter of Colonel Nicholas Bayly, brother of the first Earl of Uxbridge, of the present creation. He left children by both marriages.
