= Thomas James Maling =

Rear-Admiral Thomas James Maling
- Born: 15 July 1778
- Died: 22 January 1849 (aged 70)
- Military career
- Allegiance: United Kingdom
- Branch: Royal Navy
- Service years: 1791–1849
- Rank: Rear-Admiral
- Commands: HMS Alkmaar; HMS Diana; HMS Undaunted; HMS Mulgrave; HMS Northumberland
- Conflicts: Napoleonic Wars; Action of 5 November 1813

Thomas James Maling Miniature

Thomas James Maling (15 July 1778 – 22 January 1849) was a Royal Navy officer, a captain during Napoleonic Wars and later promoted to Rear-Admiral.

== Biography ==
He was the son of Christopher Thompson Maling, DL, of Worcestershire, and scion of the Maling pottery family.

Commissioned into the Royal Navy in 1791, he was promoted to Lieutenant in 1797, Commander in 1798, Captain in 1800, and Rear-Admiral in 1830.

He commanded Alkmaar (1800–1801), Diana (1801–1807), Undaunted (1807–1810), Mulgrave (1812–1814) and Northumberland (1821–1822). He commanded Mulgrave during the action of 5 November 1813.

He married Harriet Darwin, daughter of the poet and physician Erasmus Darwin and his second wife, Elizabeth Colyear, illegitimate daughter of Charles Colyear, 2nd Earl of Portmore. Harriet died in 1825 in Valparaíso, Chile, without issue. In 1828 he was married again, to Jemima Bromley, daughter of Henry Bromley; they had four children, including a son of the same name:

- Elizabeth Anne Maling (1830–1866), noted horticulturist and author of several books on plant care. Married 1865 to Count de Vandalin Mniszeck, an Austrian noble.
- Jemima Maling (1834–?)
- Thomas James Maling (1836–1922), New Zealand importer and merchant
- Emma Maling (1838–?)

He died in 1849, survived by his wife, who lived until 1857.

== See also ==
- O'Byrne, William Richard (1849). "Maling, Thomas James" . A Naval Biographical Dictionary . John Murray – via Wikisource.
