= Maxime Julien Émeriau de Beauverger =

French admiral (1762–1845)

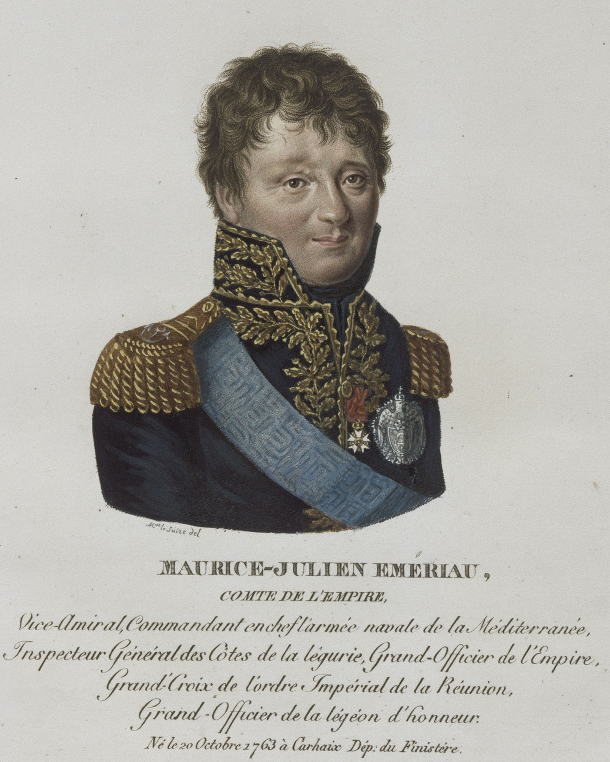

Maxime Julien Émeriau de Beauverger (French pronunciation: [maksim ʒyljɛ̃ eməʁjo də bovɛʁʒe]; 20 October 1762 in Carhaix – 2 February 1845 in Toulon) was a French Navy officer and admiral.

== Biography ==
=== American War of Independence ===
Emeriau joined the Navy in 1776, just before the outbreak of the American War of Independence, taking service on the fluyt Sylphe.

He took part in the Battle of Ushant on the Intrépide in 1778. He was then transferred on the Diadème, in Admiral d'Estaing's fleet, taking part in the Battle of Grenada, where he was wounded, and in the Siege of Savannah, where one of his eyes was wounded.

Emeriau served under Lamotte-Picquet during the Battle of Martinique.

After rising to lieutenant de frégate, he took part in the campaigns of Admiral de Grasse, serving aboard a number of ships. He took part in the Battle of St. Kitts and in the Battle of the Saintes, where he was twice wounded.

After the Treaty of Paris, Emeriau sailed with the commerce.

In 1786, Emeriau returned to the Navy as a sub-lieutenant. He sailed to the Caraibs on the Chameauand Mulet, and then on the 74-gun Patriote and the frigate Fine, until 1791.

=== Revolutionary wars ===
On 1 January 1792, Emeriau was promoted to lieutenant. The next year, he received command of the corvette Cerf. He notably ferried a convoy of refugees to New England after a fire devastated Cap-Français. From 1793, Emeriau captained the Embuscade, taking part in, under Pierre Jean Van Stabel, the escort of the grain convoy that was the background for the Glorious First of June. In December 1794, Emeriau was promoted to captain, receiving command of the Conquérant, and later of the Timoléon, both in the Mediterranean fleet under Admiral Pierre Martin. He took part in the various battles fought by the fleet, notably the Battle of Genoa and the Battle of the Hyères Islands.

In 1796, Emeriau took part in the Expédition d'Irlande, captaining the Jemmapes. In 1798, Emeriau served in François-Paul Brueys d'Aigalliers' fleet, as commodore on the Spartiate. He led the French squadron that captured Malta. He took part in the Battle of the Nile, where Spartiate was the third ship in the French line. She dueled with Nelson's Vanguard, and Audacious from 19:00. At 21:00, Emeriau, twice wounded and facing three opponents, orders the colours struck. In July 1802, Emeriau was promoted to counter admiral, commanding a division with his flag on the 80-gun Indomptable. He took part in the French repression of the Haitian Revolution. In 1803, he was transferred to command part of the flotilla in Ostend, before returning to Lorient to command a division, with his flag on Jemmapes.

=== Préfet maritime and chief commander in Toulon ===
In late 1803, Emeriau was promoted to préfet maritime in Toulon. He served in this capacity until 1811. when he took command of the Mediterranean squadron as a vice-admiral. The fleet was however blockaded in its harbour by Lord Exmouth's fleet, and was unable to mount large-scale operations.

On 7 March 1813, he was promoted to vice-admiral and nominated inspector of the coasts of Ligurie.

During the Hundred Days, Emeriau was made a Pair de France. However, he never had a chance to serve in this capacity. The Bourbon Restoration sent him into retirement, making him a Pair de France in 1831.

== Freemasonry ==
Emeriau was a Freemason, member of four lodges: the Mère Loge Écossaise, the lodge Paix et Parfaite Union in Toulon, Amitié à l'Épreuve and Amis Fidèles de Saint Napoléon in Marseille.

He was a member of the Society of the Cincinnati.

== Honours ==
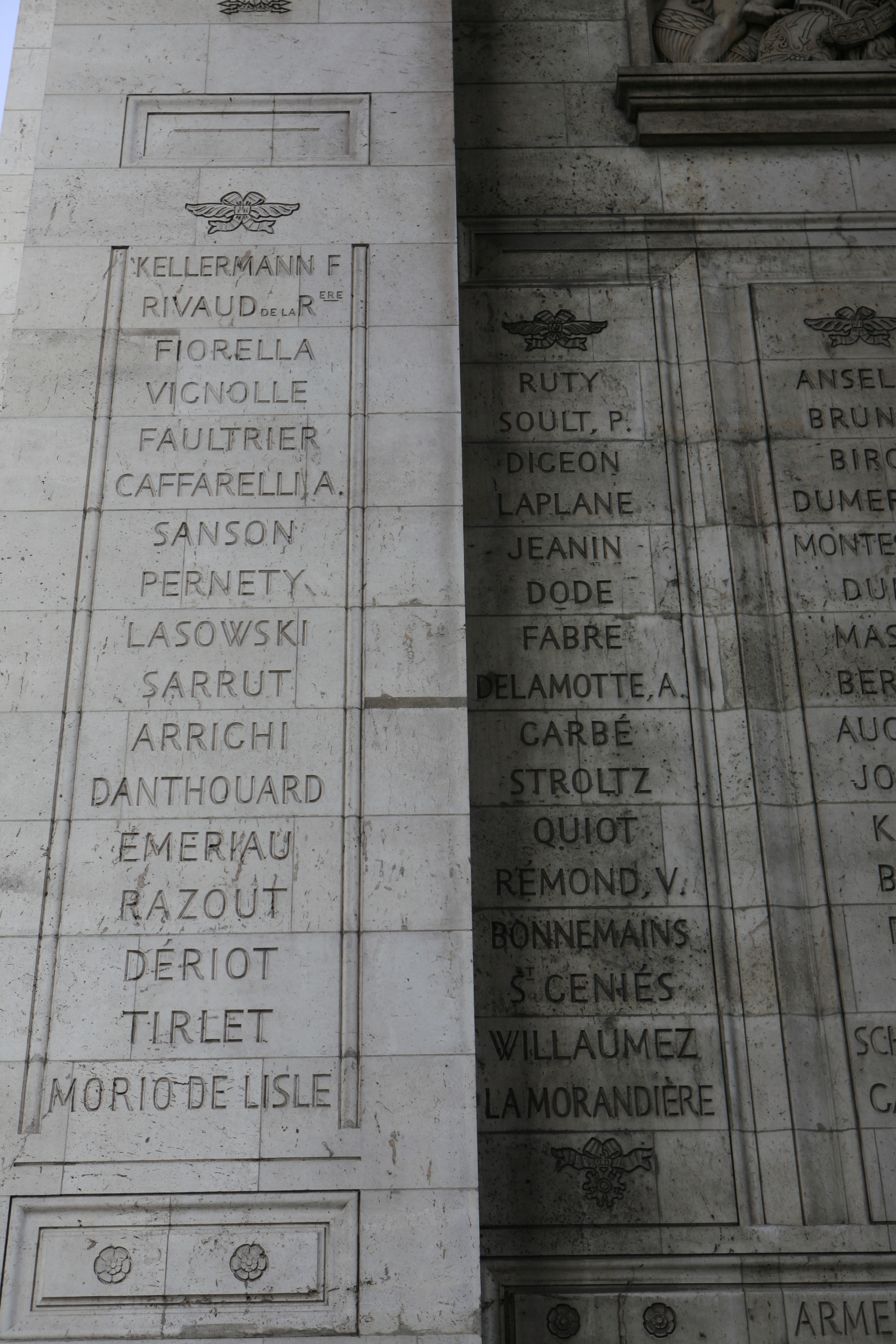
Emeriau's name engrave on the Arc de Triomphe (fifth from bottom).

- Name engraved on the Southern pillar of the Arc de Triomphe
- Grand cross of the Legion of Honour
- Knight of the Order of Saint Louis

== Bibliography ==
- Six, Georges (1934). "Emeriau de Beauverger (Maxime-Julien, comte)". Dictionnaire biographique des généraux et amiraux français de la Révolution et de l'Empire: 1792–1814 (in French). Vol. 1. Paris: Librairie Historique et Nobilaire. pp. 423–434.
- Dictionnaire des Marins Francs-Maçons (sous la direction de Jean Marc Van Hille), Éditions le Phare de Misaine, Nantes, 2008.
