= Sir William Heathcote, 3rd Baronet =

Member of Parliament for Hampshire
- In office 1790–1806

Personal details
- Born: 21 June 1746
- Died: 26 June 1819 (aged 73)
- Children: Sir Thomas Freeman-Heathcote, 4th Baronet

Sir William Heathcote, 3rd Baronet (21 June 1746 – 26 June 1819) was an English politician. He served as a Member of Parliament (MP).

== Biography ==
Born into the Heathcote family, he was MP for Hampshire.

== See also ==
- List of MPs elected in the 1796 British general election
- List of MPs elected in the 1802 United Kingdom general election
