= Battle of Tory Island order of battle =

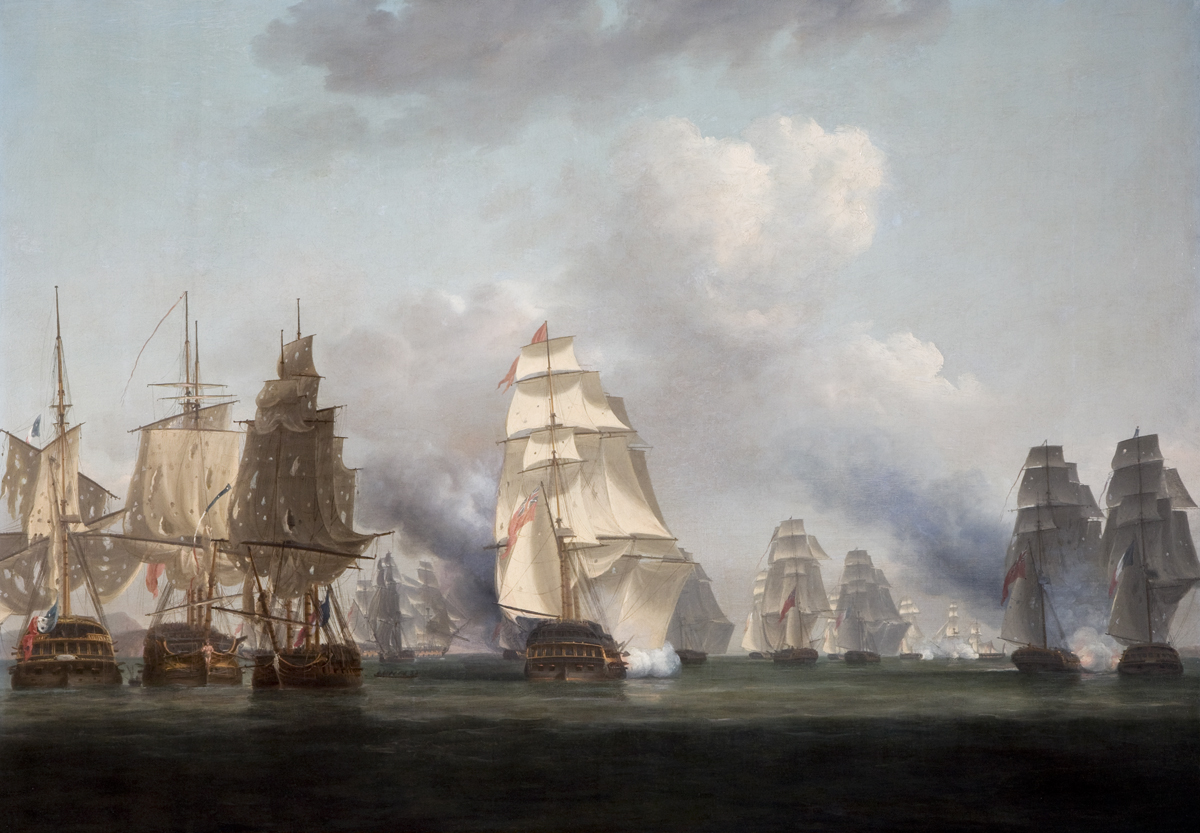
Painting of the battle by Nicholas Pocock

The Battle of Tory Island was a naval action fought on 12 October 1798 off the north coast of Ireland. The battle contested an attempted French invasion of Donegal in support of the Irish Rebellion of 1798, with a French squadron under Jean-Baptiste-François Bompart facing a hastily assembled Royal Navy blockade squadron under Sir John Borlase Warren. Bompart's force had been dispatched from Brest the month before with orders to reinforce a French army under Jean Humbert which had landed two months earlier.

Unbeknown to Bompart's force, Humbert's army and the rebellion as a whole had been defeated by British troops a week before Bompart departed France. Bompart's squadron too was woefully understrength consisting of only a single ship of the line and eight frigates carrying 3,000 men. This small force faced a large proportion of the British Channel Fleet, which was prepared for a second invasion attempt after Humbert's army had landed unopposed in August. As a result, Bompart's force was spotted just a few hours after he left Brest and he was then chased into the Atlantic Ocean by several British frigates which followed him for a week until he was able to lose them in heavy weather. This weather persisted throughout the campaign, causing significant damage to both sides in a series of storms.

The delay caused by the pursuit of Bompart by the frigates under George Countess allowed the British to dispatch a more substantial squadron under Warren to the Donegal coast. Thus when Bompart arrived in the lee of Tory Island, he soon found himself threatened on all sides by a superior British force. Despite the damage his ships had suffered in the heavy weather conditions, Bompart attempted to escape but was swiftly run down and defeated in battle, his flagship and three frigates being captured and towed into Lough Swilly. Among the prisoners seized on board the flagship was Theobald Wolfe Tone, leader of the United Irishmen, whose capture and subsequent death signified the end of the rebellion. Over the next week, the scattered French survivors desperately attempted to reach the safety of French harbours in the face of dozens of British warships cruising along their homeward route. Only two made it, three others being hunted down and captured, one just a few miles from the entrance to Brest. The French never again attempted an invasion of Ireland.

== Action of 12 October 1798 ==
Commodore Warren's squadron
Ship	Rate	Guns	Commander	Casualties			Notes
Ship	Rate	Guns	Commander	Killed	Wounded	Total	Notes
HMS Robust	Third rate	74	Captain Edward Thornbrough	11	38	49	Badly damaged.
HMS Magnanime	Fifth rate	44	Captain Michael de Courcy	0	7	7	Damaged.
HMS Ethalion	Fifth rate	38	Captain George Countess	1	4	5	
HMS Amelia	Fifth rate	38	Captain Charles Herbert	0	0	0	
HMS Melampus	Fifth rate	36	Captain Graham Moore	0	1	1	
HMS Canada	Third rate	74	Commodore Sir John Borlase Warren	1	0	1	
HMS Foudroyant	Third rate	80	Captain Sir Thomas Byard	0	9	9	
HMS Anson	Fifth rate	44	Captain Philip Charles Durham	2	13	15	Badly damaged by weather conditions.
Total casualties: 15 killed, 72 wounded, 87 total
Commodore Bompart's Squadron
Sémillante	Fifth rate	36	Captain Martin-Antoine Lacouture	0	0	0	Returned to Brest.
Romaine	Fifth rate	40	Captain Mathieu-Charles Bergevin	0	3	3	Returned to Brest.
Bellone	Fifth rate	36	Captain Louis Léon Jacob	20	45	65	Badly damaged and captured. Purchased for the Royal Navy as HMS Proserpine but never saw active service.
Immortalité	Fifth rate	40	Captain Jean-François Legrand	0	0	0	Escaped, captured on 20 October.
Loire	Fifth rate	40	Captain Adrien-Joseph Segond	10	24	34	Escaped, captured on 18 October.
Hoche	Third rate	74	Commodore Jean-Baptiste-François Bompart; Captain Desiré-Marie Maistral			270	Badly damaged and captured. Commissioned in the Royal Navy as HMS Donegal.
Coquille	Fifth rate	36	Captain Léonore Deperonne	18	31	49	Captured. Accidentally exploded at Hamoaze claiming 13 lives.
Embuscade	Fifth rate	36	Captain Nicolas Clément de la Roncière	15	26	41	Captured. Commissioned in the Royal Navy as HMS Ambuscade.
Résolue	Fifth rate	36	Captain Jean-Pierre Bargeau	0	5	5	Escaped, captured on 14 October.
Biche	Schooner	8	Lieutenant Jean-Marie-Pierre Labastard	0	0	0	Detached from the battleline and not engaged in the action. Returned to Brest undamaged.
Total casualties: 460
Source: James, pp. 124–132, Clowes pp. 344–351

== Action of 13 October 1798 ==
Ship	Rate	Guns	Commander	Casualties			Notes
Ship	Rate	Guns	Commander	Killed	Wounded	Total	Notes
HMS Melampus	Fifth rate	36	Captain Graham Moore	0	0	0	
Résolue	Fifth rate	36	Captain Jean-Pierre Bargeau	10	Several	-	Captured. Purchased for the Royal Navy as HMS Resolue but never saw active service.
Source: James, pp. 135–136, Clowes pp. 344–351

== Flight of Loire, 15–18 October 1798 ==
Ship	Rate	Guns	Commander	Casualties			Notes
Ship	Rate	Guns	Commander	Killed	Wounded	Total	Notes
HMS Mermaid	Fifth rate	32	Captain James Newman Newman	4	13	17	Badly damaged.
HMS Kangaroo	Brig	18	Commander Edward Brace	0	0	0	
HMS Anson	Fifth rate	44	Captain Philip Charles Durham	2	13	15	
Total casualties: 6 killed, 26 wounded, 32 total
Loire	Fifth rate	40	Captain Adrien-Joseph Segond	46	71	117	Badly damaged and captured. Commissioned in the Royal Navy as HMS Loire.
Total casualties: 46 killed, 71 wounded, 117 total
Source: James, pp. 137–141, Clowes pp. 344–351

== Action of 20 October 1798 ==
Ship	Rate	Guns	Commander	Casualties			Notes
Ship	Rate	Guns	Commander	Killed	Wounded	Total	Notes
HMS Fisgard	Fifth rate	38	Captain Thomas Byam Martin	10	26	36	Badly damaged.
Immortalité	Fifth rate	36	Captain Jean-François Legrand †	54	61	115	Badly damaged and captured. Commissioned in the Royal Navy as HMS Immortalite.
Sources: James, pp. 142–143; Henderson, p. 77, Clowes pp. 344–351

== Savary's retreat, 28–30 October 1798 ==
Captain Saumarez's squadron
Ship	Rate	Guns	Commander	Casualties			Notes
Ship	Rate	Guns	Commander	Killed	Wounded	Total	Notes
HMS Caesar	Third rate	80	Captain Sir James Saumarez	0	0	0	Damaged by weather conditions, retired from the chase on 28 October.
HMS Terrible	Third rate	74	Captain Sir Richard Bickerton	0	0	0	
HMS Melpomene	Fifth rate	38	Captain Sir Charles Hamilton	0	0	0	
Commodore Savary's Squadron
Concorde	Frigate	40	Commodore Daniel Savary; Captain André Papin	0	0	0	
Franchise	Frigate	44	Captain Jean-Louis Guillotin-Gonthière	0	0	0	
Médée	Frigate	32	Captain Jean-Daniel Coudin	0	0	0	
Vénus	Corvette	28	Captain André Senez	0	0	0	
Source: James, pp. 145–147
