= HMS Melpomene (1794) =

Frigate of the French and Royal Navy (1788-1815)

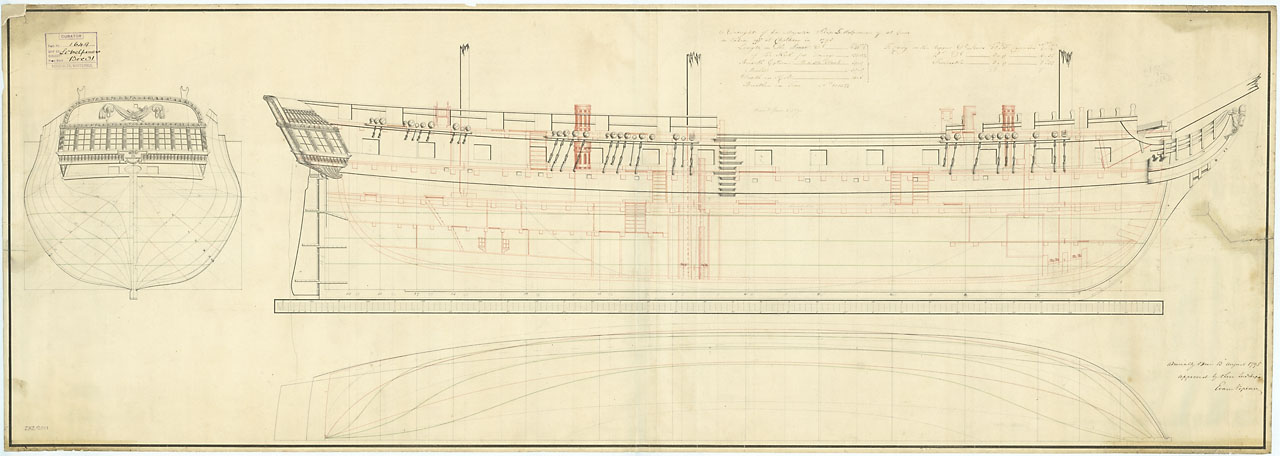
- Melpomene (drawn when captured, 1794)

History

France
- Name: Melpomène
- Builder: Toulon Dockyard
- Laid down: February 1788
- Launched: 6 August 1789
- Captured: 10 August 1794 by the Royal Navy

Great Britain
- Name: Melpomene
- Fate: Sold 1815

General characteristics (as re-measured following her capture)
- Class & type: Minerve-class frigate
- Displacement: 1,330 tonneaux
- Tons burthen: 700 port tonneaux; 1,013 52/94 (bm)
- Length: 148 feet 2 inches (45.2 m) (gundeck); 123 feet 8 1/4 inches (37.7 m) (keel)
- Beam: 39 feet 3 inches (12 m)
- Depth: 13 feet 6 inches (4.1 m)
- Propulsion: sail
- Sail plan: Full-rigged ship
- Armament: Gundeck: 28 × 18 pdr (8.2 kg) long guns; Upperworks: 10 × 8 pdr (3.6 kg) long guns

General characteristics (as re-armed by the British)
- Armament: Gundeck: 28 × 18 pdr (8.2 kg) long guns; Upperworks: 10 × 9 pdr (4.1 kg) long guns; 8 × 32 pdr (15 kg) carronades

HMS Melpomene was a 38-gun frigate of the Royal Navy. Originally a French vessel, she was captured at Calvi on 10 August 1794 and first saw British service in the English Channel, where she helped to contain enemy privateering. In October 1798, she chased a French frigate squadron sent to find the French fleet under Jean-Baptiste-François Bompart, that was routed at the Battle of Tory Island and in August 1799, she joined Andrew Mitchell's squadron for the Anglo-Russian invasion of Holland.

In April 1800, Melpomene was active along the coast of Senegal and led a small squadron that captured the island of Gorée. She later returned to the Channel where, in July 1804, she took part in a bombardment of Le Havre. For much of 1809, she was employed in the Baltic where she fought in some notable actions during the Gunboat War and the Anglo-Russian War.

== Construction and armament ==
The French ship Melpomène was built in 1788 at Toulon. A 36-gun frigate of the Minerve Class, she was ordered in 1787 and construction started February the following year. Launched on 6 August 1789, she was completed in April 1792 and armed with twenty-eight 18-pounder (8.2 kg) long guns on the gundeck and ten 8 pounders (3.6 kg) on her upperworks. After her capture, her secondary armament was upgraded so she carried eight 9-pounder (4.1 kg) long guns and six 32-pounder (15 kg) carronades on the quarterdeck, and two 9-pounders with two 32-pounder carronades on the forecastle.

The British recorded Melpomene's dimensions as: 148 feet 2 inches (45.2 m) along the gundeck with a keel length of 123 feet 8 1/4 inches (37.7 m), a beam of 39 feet 3 inches (12 m) and a depth in the hold of 13 feet 6 inches (4.1 m). She was 1,013 52/94 tons burthen.

== French Service ==
In March 1793, Melpomène sailed to Algiers, escorting two xebecs that had undergone refits at Toulon on behalf of Baba Hassan, Dey of Algiers. The next month, she was at Toulon when a mutiny broke out aboard.

In October 1793, Melpomène, under Lieutenant Gay, was part of a division also comprising Minerve, Fortunée, and the 18-gun Flèche. Last in the division, she was chased by the 64-gun HMS Agamemnon in the action of 22 October 1793. Agamemnon broken the engagement when Minerve came to support Melpomène.

In the morning of 11 January 1794, off Calvi, Melpomène detected Mignonne being chased by a British ship of the line and two frigates. She closed to support Mignonne, arriving in gun range at 1145. Mignonne broke the engagement and Melpomène herself escaped by sailing in shallow waters where the British frigates were reluctant to venture. Around 1500, they regrouped around the ship of the line. Melpomène had her lower masts and her foremast tops damaged, and had to be taken in tow to Calvi.

== British Service ==
In 1794, Melpomène was at Calvi, Corsica, when the entire island was subject to a blockade by a Royal Navy Fleet under Lord Hood. A successful invasion culminated in the capture of the port on 10 August and the seizure of Melpomène and a second French frigate, Mignonne. During the surrender negotiations, the French asked that they be allowed to keep the frigates to transport the garrison to Toulon but the British refused.

Mignonne was deemed unserviceable but Melpomene was put under the command of Charles Patterson and taken to Chatham for refitting. The work cost £6,534 and took until 1 June 1795. She was officially recognised as a British vessel on 30 March 1795 when she was registered by the Admiralty, and was commissioned the following month by Sir Charles Hamilton. She worked to contain privateering and protect British trade in the English Channel.

At 15:00 on 11 July 1796, Melpomene was 18 nautical miles (33 kilometres) to the south-southwest of Ushant, when a sail was seen to the south-east. After a five-hour chase, Melpomene forced the surrender of the vessel which turned out to be the 18-gun Revanche. The privateer from Brest had been out looking to intercept a convoy from Brazil. The 167 captured crew members were taken to Plymouth.

While cruising off the Isle of Wight on 15 May 1797, Melpomene captured Espiègle, a small armed-lugger from Fécamp carrying 32 men. On 17 July, she captured another French privateer, Triton.

On 3 August 1798, Melpomene was cruising off the north coast of Brittany with HMS Childers when a French brig, Adventurier, and accompanying merchant ships were discovered in the bay of Corréjou. The British decided to attempt a cutting out expedition under cover of darkness and a boarding party from both crews was assembled. At 22:00 that night, in stormy conditions, five boats, carrying 70 men, began a five-hour row towards the bay. At 03:00 they came alongside Adventurier and a struggle ensued in which the French crew of 79 were eventually subdued. The British had one man killed, one missing and four wounded while the French had 16 wounded, several mortally. The bad weather which had helped the attackers remain undetected during their approach became a hindrance as the captured vessel was worked out to sea but, despite having to endure a two-hour bombardment from the shore batteries, no further casualties were suffered.

=== Pursuit of Savary ===
Following a failed French invasion of Ireland in 1798, the Channel Fleet was on high alert and prepared for the next attempt which was made in August. A French fleet sent in support, under Jean-Baptiste-François Bompart, was routed at the Battle of Tory Island on 12 October and a squadron of four frigates under commodore Daniel Savary was sent to escort the survivors back to France. Having failed to find any, Savary was returning to France when, on 28 October at 07:00, his squadron was seen off Benwee Head by Melpomene, HMS Terrible, and the flagship of commodore Sir Richard Bickerton, HMS Caesar. The three ships immediately gave chase but due to light winds, it was 18:00 before any ships were close enough to exchange shots. By 23:00, the wind, which had increased considerably, carried away the topmasts of Caesar, leaving Melpomene and Terrible to forge ahead. At 08:00 the next day, the French squadron was 6 nmi (11 km) away but by noon, Melpomene, some way ahead, had closed the distance to just 2 nmi (3.7 km) miles. Fearing his entire squadron would be captured, Savary ordered his ships to scatter. Hamilton chose to try and intercept the 40-gun Concorde which was away to his south-west but heading south. The weather took a turn for the worse during the evening of 30 October and the French managed to escape to Rochefort.

Melpomene continued her crusade against privateering, capturing Tigre on 17 November and the 16-gun Zele in the Bay of Biscay on 28 February following, until she was called to join Andrew Mitchell's squadron for an Anglo-Russian invasion of Holland in August 1799.

=== Invasion of Holland ===
A combined fleet under Admiral Lord Duncan, comprising eight ships-of-the-line, three fourth rates and six frigates, one of which was Melpomene, arrived off Texel on 22 August. With it, were more than 230 other craft, carrying supplies and 27,000 troops. After failing to persuade the Dutch to hand over their ships, the troops were landed near Helder on the morning of 27 August. After an engagement with a Franco-Dutch force, the city was captured. At the same time, a single British frigate, HMS Circe, entered the Nieuwe Diep and captured the ships there which were laid up in ordinary. Among them were 13 warships carrying a total of 510 guns, and of these, four small frigates and a 44-gun vessel were added to the Royal Navy. Two days later, Mitchell's squadron entered the Vlieter roads where a Dutch squadron under Vice-Admiral Samuel Story was anchored. Three of the frigates, none of which were Melpomene, grounded in the narrow channel, but all managed to get off and join their compatriots in line opposite the Dutch, who accepted an offer to surrender and handed over their ships without a shot being fired on either side.

=== West Africa ===
In April 1800, Melpomene and HMS Magnanime were off the coast of Senegal when word was received of three French frigates moored under the gun batteries on the island of Gorée. In need of reinforcements, Hamilton had his ship make for Praia, Cape Verde, where he knew the 64-gun HMS Ruby to be revictualing. By the time the squadron arrived at Gorée, on 4 April, the French frigates had gone. With that additional protection removed, Hamilton judged that the island was vulnerable and sent a demand for its surrender. Terms were agreed and at midnight, marines from both ships were landed and the island brought under British control. On 13 April, some of the squadron's crew took part in a boat action against a Senegalese trading post, returning on 22 April with a French brigantine and a sloop full of rice.

On 17 June, Melpomene chased a 10-gun privateer, off the coast of France, for 57 hours before catching it and forcing it to strike. It turned out to be Auguste with a French crew of 50 men, on the way to Guadeloupe from Bordeaux.

On 3 January 1801, five boats from Melpomene crossed a sand bar on the Senegal river to cut-out a French 18-gun brig. As they approached, the brig opened fire sinking two of the British boats but the remainder made it alongside and after a short struggle, succeeded in boarding and capturing her. The British boats then attacked an armed schooner, which had sought shelter under a gun battery, but were forced to retreat. While bringing out the brig, she grounded on the bar and had to be abandoned; the British making off in their boats under heavy fire from the shore batteries. The expedition was a costly one for the British, with 11 men killed and 18 wounded out of the 96 who took part. The French brig, Senegal, broke up and sank into the sand.

=== Return to home waters ===
Melpomene needed a small repair in February 1803 which was undertaken at Deptford and took about a month to complete. She was recommissioned in March under Robert Dudley Oliver and operated off the French coast and in the North Sea.

In July 1804, Melpomene took part in an attack on the port of Le Havre. Le Havre was important at the time, harbouring a large number of vessels required by Napoleon's invasion force at Boulogne. Oliver's squadron, comprising Melpomene, sloops, bomb-vessels and other small craft, was stationed off the port to prevent any enemy joining, or those inside, escaping. On 23 July, the British fired on the town, setting it alight and forcing the French to move their ships further upriver. Another attack was made on 1 August resulting in a very similar outcome.

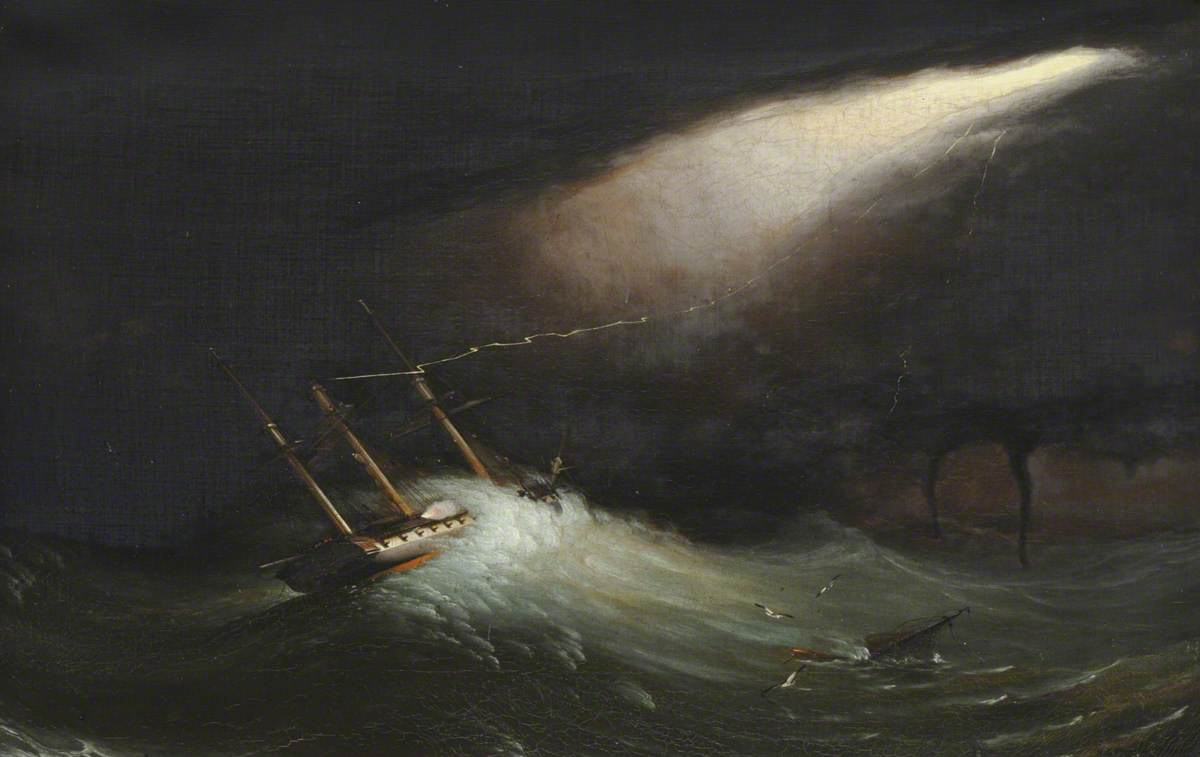
Melpomene listing severely in distress, 17 November 1805

Melpomene was at Portsmouth in September 1805. While she was there, Oliver met with Lord Nelson, who was about to leave to resume command off Cadiz. Oliver told of his disappointment that he and his ship were not going too, to which Nelson replied, "I hope you will come in time to tow some of the rascals"; Melpomene eventually joined Admiral Collingwood's fleet the day after the Battle of Trafalgar and did indeed assist in the aftermath by towing damaged prizes away from the battle site.

In December 1805, Peter Parker was appointed as Melpomene's commander, serving in the Mediterranean but returning home at the end of 1807 before leaving for Jamaica in the April following.

In November 1807 Melpomene recaptured Duke of Kent, of Dartmouth. A Spanish privateer had captured Duke of Kent.

=== Baltic campaign ===
On 11 May 1809, Melpomene chased a 6-gun cutter off Jutland which entered the harbour of Huilbo and ran ashore. Melpomene anchored and dispatched her boats while providing covering fire. The crew were able to destroy the cutter with an officer, two seamen and three marines wounded in the process.

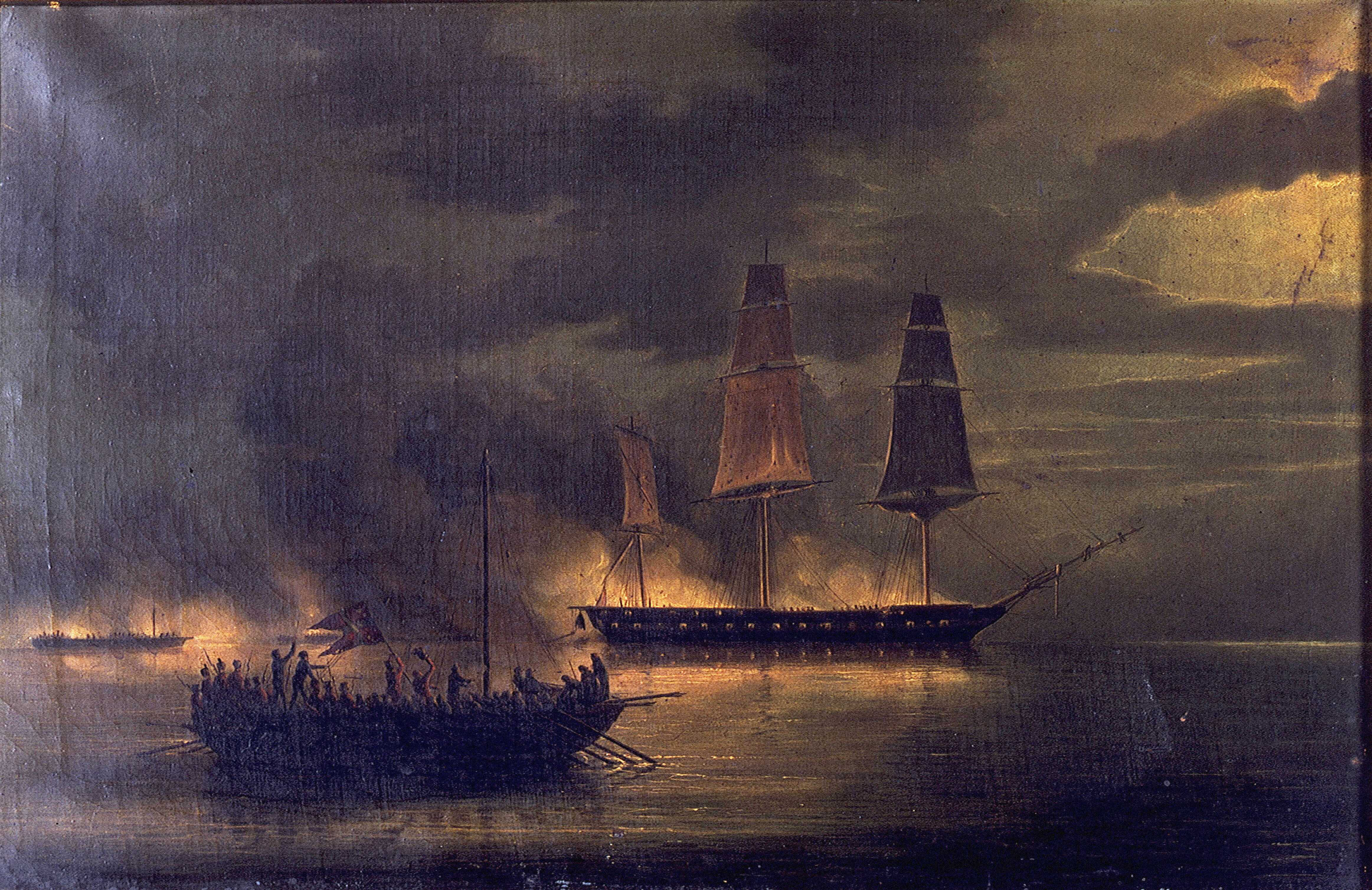
A picture of the engagement on 23 May 1809 when Melpomene was attacked by 20 Danish gunboats, 23 May 1809

Melpomene was very nearly captured on 23 May 1809, when 20 Danish gunboats found her becalmed in the Great Belt. The British frigate was anchored off Omoe Island when, at around 22:30, the Danes were spotted in the dark. The crew cleared for action and commenced firing at 11:00 but were prevented from bringing their guns to bear in the light wind. Shortly after the action started, the wind increased sufficiently to cut Melpomene's cable and manoeuvre. For several days she attempted to close with the enemy with little success. In the early hours on 30 May, the gunboats withdrew. Melpomene was much damaged by her encounter and had to return to England for repairs.

Melpomene was sent back to the Baltic where she joined a force conducting a search of the southern edge of the Gulf of Finland. At the beginning of July, she was sent by the Commander-in-Chief, Admiral James Saumarez, to cruise east of Nargen Island with HMS Implacable. They sailed into Narva Bay and there captured nine vessels laden with timber, spars and cordage, belonging to the Russian Emperor. After searching all the creeks and inlets along the coast but finding nothing else, attention switched to the north side of the Gulf where the boats of Implacable, Melpomene and Prometheus captured three more vessels among the many islands that fringe Finland. They also discovered eight Russian gunboats, each mounting a 32 and a 24-pounder gun, and carrying a crew of 46 men, protecting a convoy of merchantmen near Hango Head. Determined to capture or destroy as much of the convoy as possible, on 7 July at 21:00, 270 men from Melpomene, HMS Bellerophon and Implacable set off in 17 of the ships' boats. The Russians had positioned their vessels between two rocks, preventing them from being outflanked and forcing the British to row straight into a hail of grapeshot. The British eventually managed to capture six of the eight gunboats and sink another. All 12 merchant ships were taken and another large armed ship was burned. The British had 17 men killed and 37 wounded during the operation. Five of the dead and six of the wounded were from Melpomene. The Russians lost at least 65 men killed, and 127 taken prisoner, of whom 51 were wounded. The Admiralty later issued a clasp for the Naval General Service Medal for this action.

== Later service and fate ==
From May to August 1810, Melpomene was at Chatham Dockyard where she was stripped of her carronades and converted to a troopship. She was recommissioned under William Waldegrave and later, in 1812, Gordon Falcon.

She served in the Mediterranean until 16 March 1814, when she sailed to North America under Robert Rowley, who had taken command in October the previous year. She returned from Bermuda with the troopship HMS Ceylon, accompanied by the warships Bacchante and Curlew. After a two day period of quarantine, she came across from the Motherbank to Spithead, on 24 June 1815.

Melpomene was sold at Sheerness for £2,590 on 14 December 1815.
