= French ship Biche =

Biche has been the name of many ships in the French Navy including:

- French frigate Biche (1707), launched in 1707 and lost in 1709
- French schooner Biche (1798), launched in 1798 and decommissioned in 1803
