= Edward Thornbrough =

Royal Navy Admiral (1754–1834)

Admiral Sir Edward Thornbrough GCB
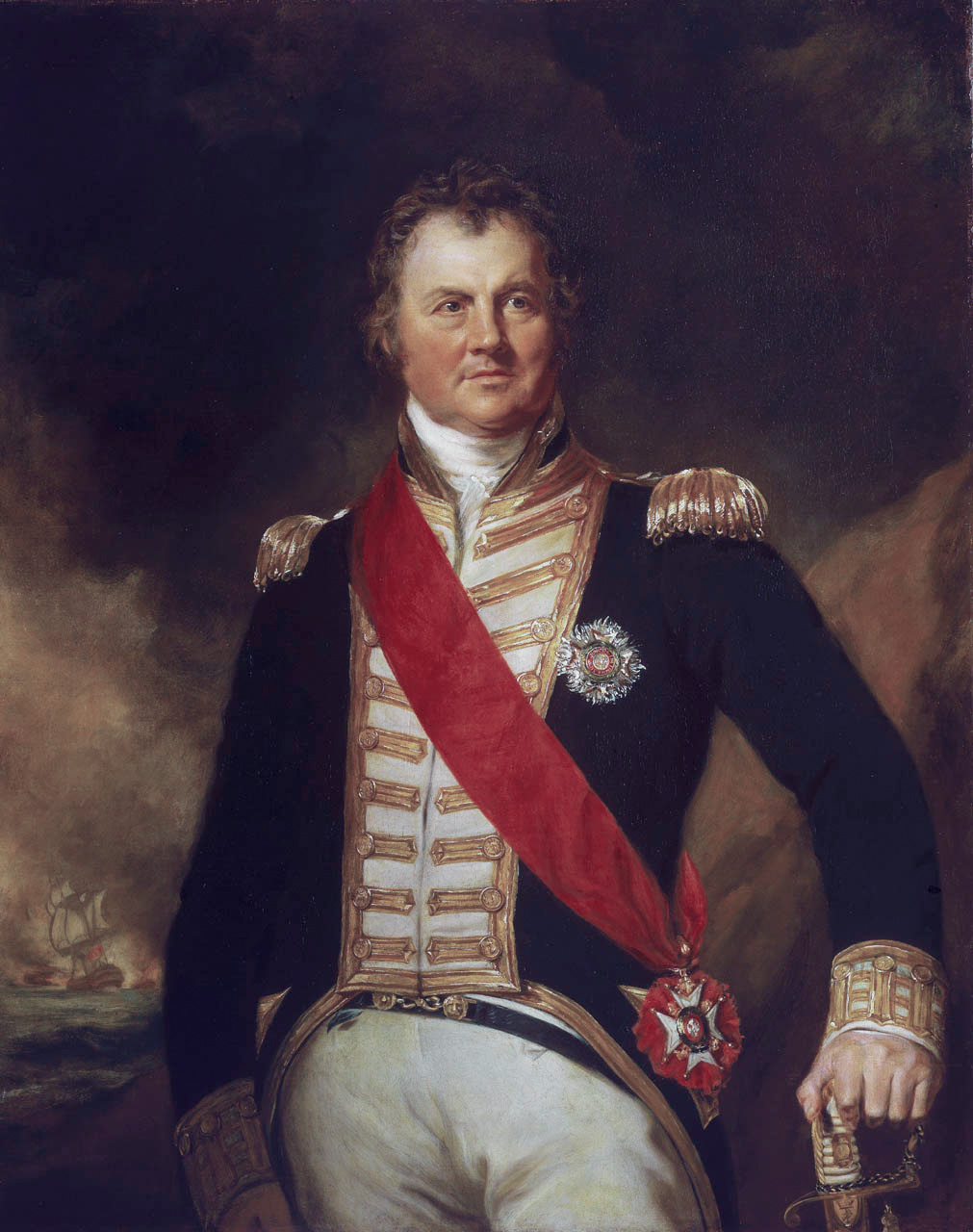
- Admiral Edward Thornborough (Samuel Lane, 1821)
- Born: 27 July 1754; Plymouth Dockyard, Devon
- Died: 3 April 1834 (aged 79); Bishopsteignton Lodge, Devon
- Military career
- Allegiance: United Kingdom
- Branch: Royal Navy
- Service years: 1761 to 1818
- Rank: Admiral
- Commands: The Downs; Cork Station; Portsmouth Command
- Conflicts: American Revolutionary War; Battle of Bunker Hill; Action in Cape Ann Harbour; Capture of Nymphe; Wreck of HMS Blonde; French Revolutionary Wars; Glorious First of June; Invasion of Quiberon Bay; Battle of Donegal; Napoleonic Wars
- Awards: Knight Grand Cross of the Order of the Bath

Admiral Sir Edward Thornbrough, GCB (27 July 1754 – 3 April 1834) was a senior, long-serving veteran officer of the British Royal Navy during the late eighteenth and early nineteenth century. He saw action in the American Revolutionary War, the French Revolutionary Wars and the Napoleonic Wars, being wounded several times and once captured by American forces after a shipwreck. During the wreck, his conduct towards American prisoners aboard his ship was considered so exemplary that the American authorities later released him without parole or exchange.

During the later conflict, Thornbrough won praise for taking his frigate into the thick of the action at the Glorious First of June, towing the shattered HMS Bellerophon to safety after she was isolated by several French ships of the line. Later, Thornbrough became a senior admiral in both the Channel Fleet and the Mediterranean Fleet under Cuthbert Collingwood, who held him in high esteem. He retired in 1818 and settled in Devon with his third wife, dying in 1834.

== Early career ==
Thornbrough was born in 1754, the son of Commander Edward and Mary Thornbrough. With a father in the Navy, young Edward's career was destined, especially given his close proximity in his early life to the sea; he was born on Plymouth Dock. Thornbrough joined his father at sea in 1761, as captain's servant on HMS Arrogant, and spent two years in the Mediterranean becoming used to the sea. Aged nine in 1763, he attended school whilst being on the books of HMS Firm. He returned to the sea in 1768 aboard HMS Temeraire with his father. The ship was commanded by Edward Le Cras. Thornbrough would later marry two of Le Cras's daughters.

Temeraire was guardship at Portsmouth, and in the time of peace this was a monotonous duty. Thornbrough therefore moved around several ships to broaden his education, traveling to Gibraltar and spending time on HMS Albion. He moved to HMS Captain with his father and in 1771 they sailed for Boston. For two more years the ship acted as guardship in the American port and also provided a floating headquarters for Admiral John Montagu. Thornbrough performed a brief independent cruise in HMS Cruizer, but the service was otherwise uneventful and he returned to Britain with Captain in 1774.

== American Revolutionary War ==
In 1775, at the outbreak of the American Revolutionary War, Thornbrough returned to North America in the sloop HMS Falcon as second in command. Falcon participated in the bombardment of rebel positions during the Battle of Bunker Hill, and in August Thornbrough was badly wounded in a failed attempt to seize an American schooner from Cape Ann harbour. Invalided to Britain, Thornbrough recovered in 1776 and joined the frigate HMS Richmond off the Eastern Seaboard. In 1779 he was transferred to HMS Garland and escorted a convoy to Newfoundland. Returning to Europe in 1780, Thornbrough joined the frigate HMS Flora and in her participated in the capture of the French frigate Nymphe after a long and bloody action.

As consequence of his part in this engagement, Thornbrough was promoted to commander and took over the hired vessel HMS Britannia escorting a convoy to New York City. On arrival, Thornbrough was again promoted to post captain and took over captaincy of the frigate HMS Blonde. In 1782, Blonde captured an American brig and attempted to tow her to Halifax, Nova Scotia. During the operation the ship became lost in fog and Blonde was wrecked on a rocky islet whilst the brig continued to Halifax. On the islet, Thornbrough made sure that the American prisoners from the brig were given the same standards of treatment as the British sailors. When the survivors were rescued by two American ships a few days later, the American authorities were so impressed with his behaviour that they conveyed him to New York and released him without conditions as a reward. Returning to Britain, Thornbrough was to be given the ship of the line HMS Egmont, but the end of the war prevented this.

== French Revolutionary Wars ==
The ten years of peace following the American war resulted in many officers entering semi-retirement on half-pay. Thornbrough however was given the prize frigate HMS Hebe and had Prince William Henry on board as a lieutenant. Although the Prince was a notoriously difficult officer to serve alongside, Thornbrough became friends with his subordinate, whose patronage would help him with his future career. Thornbrough married Ann Le Cras in 1784, and Prince William requested that their first son was to be named after him. The son would later become Lieutenant William Henry Thornbrough, but died in 1798 aged 14. The couple would also have another son, Edward Le Cras Thornbrough, who became an admiral and four daughters. Also in 1784, Thornbrough's father died. In 1790 during the Spanish armament, Thornbrough briefly took over HMS Scipio.

At the outbreak of the French Revolutionary Wars, Thornbrough requested and received command of the frigate HMS Latona. In November 1793, Thornbrough engaged several French ships of the line in a vain attempt to delay them until British warships could arrive to challenge them. In May 1794, Latona was a scout for the Channel Fleet under Lord Howe during the Atlantic campaign of May 1794. The campaign resulted in the Glorious First of June, when Latona was initially used as a repeating ship to relay Howe's signals down the British line. Later in the action however, Thornbrough was called on to take his relatively diminutive ship through the battle lines to rescue the shattered HMS Bellerophon which was being pounded by several large French ships. Latona not only reached Bellerophon, but then drove off the French battleships with her small broadsides and took the dismasted Bellerophon in tow to safety, all without suffering a casualty.

Thornbrough then took command of the ship of the line HMS Robust with the Channel Fleet, participated in the ill-fated 1795 invasion of Quiberon Bay with French Royalist forces. The operation was a failure and Robust was also engaged in its desperate evacuation. Three years later, Thornbrough participated in another invasion, this time thwarting a French attempt to land troops in Ireland. At the Battle of Donegal, Sir John Borlase Warren's squadron, including Robust, destroyed a French troops convoy off Tory Island to the north of Ireland. As reward, Thornbrough was given the thanks of parliament and took over the 90-gun HMS Formidable, flagship of Sir Charles Cotton. Formidable then entered the Mediterranean and spent several months searching for an elusive enemy fleet.

== Napoleonic Wars ==
In 1801, Thornbrough became a rear-admiral and commanded the inshore squadron off Brest in his flagship HMS Mars. In 1801 his first wife died and a year later, Thornbrough married Elizabeth Jeynes of Bristol. With the renewal of war in 1803, Thornbrough was given command of The Downs under Viscount Keith and later was fleet captain to Lord Gardner. In 1805 he was in HMS Kent on his way to join Nelson's fleet off Cádiz when he heard of the Battle of Trafalgar. That year he was promoted to vice-admiral and led the independent blockade of Rochefort and later a squadron in the English Channel from HMS Prince of Wales.

A period of ill-health required a brief shore leave in 1807, but he was soon back at sea, in HMS Royal Sovereign. For the next three years he was second in command to Lord Collingwood in the Mediterranean but returned to Britain in December 1809 due to ill-health shortly before his commander's death. Both Collingwood and Earl St Vincent admired his spirit, professional skill and bravery, but the latter considered that Thornbrough was too indecisive to make a good fleet commander.

== Retirement ==
From 1810 until 1813, Thornbrough busied himself in command of the Cork Station. In 1813 he again briefly retired as a full admiral and in 1815 was made a Knight Commander of the Order of the Bath in recognition of his long service. In 1813 his second wife had died and again he remarried less than a year later, to Frances Le Cras, younger sister of his first wife. Between 1815 and 1818, Thornbrough served as Commander-in-Chief, Portsmouth and he retired for good in 1818 after just under 50 years of service in the Navy, an exceptionally long career.

Thornbrough lived the rest of his life at Bishopsteignton Lodge in Devon. In 1825 he was made a Knight Grand Cross. He was however active in naval circles and became Vice-Admiral of the United Kingdom and Lieutenant of the Admiralty in 1833 during his retirement. He died at home in 1834.

== See also ==
- O'Byrne, William Richard (1849). "Thornbrough, Edward Le Cras#cite note-Edward Thornbrough-1" . A Naval Biographical Dictionary . John Murray – via Wikisource.

== Notes ==
Military offices
Preceded by Skeffington Lutwidge	Commander-in-Chief, The Downs; 1803	Succeeded by Philip Patton
Preceded by James Hawkins-Whitshed	Commander-in-Chief, Cork Station; 1810–1813	Succeeded by Herbert Sawyer
Preceded by Sir Richard Bickerton	Commander-in-Chief, Portsmouth; 1815–1818	Succeeded by Sir George Campbell
Honorary titles
Preceded by The Viscount Exmouth	Vice-Admiral of the United Kingdom; 1833–1834	Succeeded by Sir George Martin
