= HMS Charon (1783) =

Fifth-rate ship of the Royal Navy

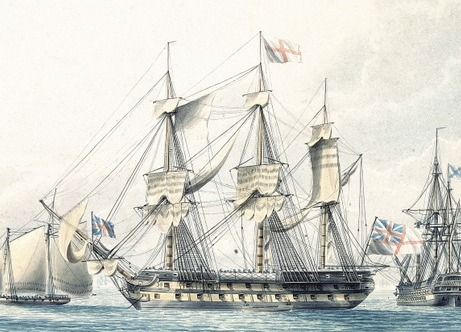
- Charon's sister ship HMS Argo

History

United Kingdom
- Name: HMS Charon
- Namesake: Charon
- Ordered: 19 September 1781
- Builder: Hilhouse, Bristol
- Cost: £20,065
- Laid down: May 1782
- Launched: 17 May 1783
- Completed: 5 February 1784
- Commissioned: September 1792
- Fate: Broken up December 1805

General characteristics
- Class & type: Roebuck-class fifth-rate
- Tons burthen: 889 63/94 (bm)
- Length: 140 ft 1 1/2 in (42.7 m) (gun deck); 115 ft 3 7/8 in (35.2 m) (keel)
- Beam: 38 ft 1 in (11.6 m)
- Draught: 11 ft 3 in (3.4 m) (forward); 14 ft 11 in (4.5 m) (aft)
- Depth of hold: 16 ft 4 1/2 in (5.0 m)
- Propulsion: Sails
- Complement: 300
- Armament: 1792: Lower deck: 20 × 18-pounder guns; Upper deck: 22 × 12-pounder guns; Quarterdeck: Nil; Forecastle: 2 × 6-pounder guns; 1793: Lower deck: Nil; Upper deck: 4 × 9-pounder guns; Quarterdeck: 4 × 6-pounder guns; Forecastle: Nil; 1800: Lower deck: Nil; Upper deck: 16 × 9-pounder guns; Quarterdeck: 4 × 6-pounder guns; Forecastle: Nil

HMS Charon was a 44-gun fifth-rate Roebuck-class ship of the Royal Navy launched in 1783. Initially kept in ordinary, the ship first saw service off the coast of Africa in 1792. Returned to Britain in 1793 for the French Revolutionary Wars, she was converted into a hospital ship for the Channel Fleet. In this role Charon was present at the Glorious First of June in 1794 and the Battle of Groix in 1795. The ship then joined the Leeward Islands Station, where she operated as a store ship and participated in the capture of St Lucia in 1796.

Returned to Britain in 1797, Charon was used during the Irish Rebellion of 1798 to convey reinforcements from Britain. From 1799 the ship was predominantly based in the Mediterranean Sea, being converted into a troop ship in the following year. Charon then formed part of the blockade for the Siege of Genoa, and in 1801 participated in the landings at the Battle of Abukir where she had five men wounded. Charon returned to Britain in 1804 and was broken up in the following year.

== Design ==
Charon was a 44-gun, 18-pounder Roebuck-class ship. The class was a revival of the design used to construct the fifth-rate HMS Roebuck in 1769, by Sir Thomas Slade. The ships, while classified as fifth-rates, were not frigates because they carried two gun decks, of which a frigate would have only one. Roebuck was designed as such to provide the extra firepower a ship of two decks could bring to warfare but with a much lower draught and smaller profile. From 1751 to 1776 only two ships of this type were built for the Royal Navy because it was felt that they were anachronistic, with the lower (and more heavily armed) deck of guns being so low as to be unusable in anything but the calmest of waters. (Note: This problem was demonstrated in a sister ship of Charon, HMS Argo, which two French frigates captured in 1783 because the weather was so bad she was not able to open her lower gun ports during the battle.) In the 1750s the cruising role of the 44-gun two deck ship was taken over by new 32- and 36-gun frigates, leaving the type almost completely obsolete.

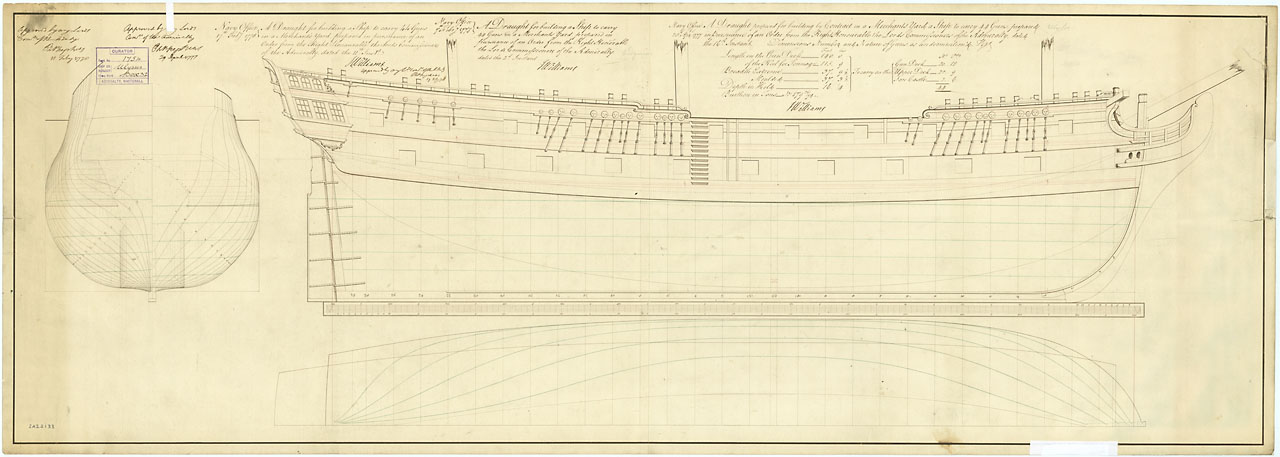
Plan of the Roebuck-class ships

When the American Revolutionary War began in 1775 a need was found for heavily armed ships that could fight in the shallow coastal waters of North America, where two-decked third-rates could not safely sail, and so the Roebuck class of nineteen ships, alongside the similar Adventure class, was ordered to the specifications of the original ships to fill this need. The frigate classes that had overtaken the 44-gun ship as the preferred design for cruisers were at this point still mostly armed with 9- and 12-pounder guns, and it was expected that the class's heavier 18-pounders would provide them with an advantage over these vessels. Frigates with larger armaments would go on to be built by the Royal Navy later on in the American Revolutionary War, but these ships were highly expensive and so Charon and her sisters continued to be built as a cheaper alternative.

== Construction ==
Ships of the class built after 1782 received an updated armament, replacing small upper deck 9-pounder guns with more modern 12-pounders. All ships laid down after the first four of the class, including Charon, had the double level of stern windows Roebuck had been designed with removed and replaced with a single level of windows, moving the style of the ships closer to that of a true frigate. (Note: While the earlier ships of the class had two levels of stern windows, there was only ever one level of cabins behind them.)

All but one ship of the class were contracted out to civilian dockyards for construction, and the contract for Charon was given to Hilhouse at Bristol. The ship was ordered on 19 September 1781 and laid down in May the following year. Charon was launched on 17 May 1783 with the following dimensions: 140 feet 1 1/2 inches (42.7 m) along the gun deck, 115 feet 3 7/8 inches (35.2 m) at the keel, with a beam of 38 feet 1 inch (11.6 m) and a depth in the hold of 16 feet 4 1/2 inches (5.0 m). Her draught, which made the class so valued in the American Revolutionary War, was 11 feet 3 inches (3.4 m) forward and 14 feet 11 inches (4.5 m) aft. She measured 889 63/94 tons burthen. The fitting out process for Charon was completed on 5 February 1784 at Plymouth Dockyard. Her construction and fitting out cost in total £20,065.

Charon received an armament of twenty 18-pounder long guns on her lower deck, with twenty-two 12-pounders on the upper deck. These were complemented by two 6-pounders on the forecastle; the quarterdeck was unarmed. The ship was to have a crew of 300 men. Charon was named after Charon, the mythological ferryman of the River Styx. She was the second ship of the class to take the name, it being re-issued after the original Charon was destroyed at the Siege of Yorktown in 1781.

== Service ==
=== African coast ===
The American Revolutionary War ended in 1783, while Charon was still under construction. With the wartime necessity of using the obsolete ships as frontline warships now at an end, most ships of the type were taken out of service. While lacking modern fighting capabilities, the design still provided a fast ship, and so the Comptroller of the Navy, Sir Charles Middleton, pressed them into service as troop ships. After her launch Charon stayed in ordinary at Plymouth. She was refitted and received her copper sheathing between September and December 1786, costing £2,662.

Charon continued at Plymouth until September 1792 when she was commissioned under the command of Captain Edmund Dod. She then underwent work to fit her for active service which was completed on 15 November, having cost a further £4,563. Charon sailed to begin serving off the coast of West Africa on 23 November, with Dod appointed as commodore for the station. By January 1793 the ship was stationed at Cape Roxo and also spent time at Praia. Charon also visited settlements along the African coast alongside the 16-gun sloop HMS Scorpion. With the French Revolutionary Wars underway, Britain declared war on France in February while Charon was at Praia, at which point she was the only Royal Navy warship on the coast of Africa. The ship returned to Britain in September and was then paid off.

=== Channel Fleet ===
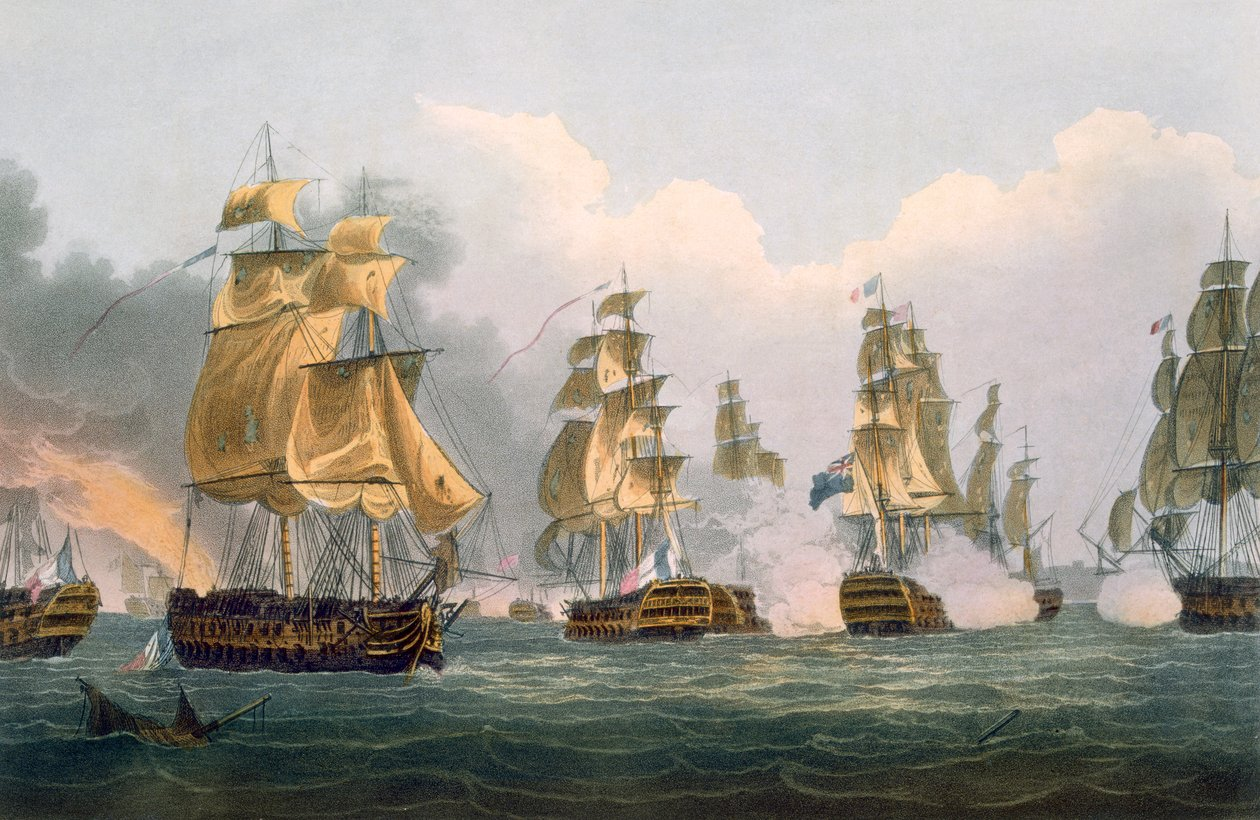
Charon served as a hospital ship at the Battle of Groix

This period in Africa was the only point in Charon's service where she served in her original configuration as a warship. Sent to Woolwich Dockyard, between October 1793 and January 1794 the ship was transformed into a hospital ship. This role was not to provide facilities for the tending of injuries, but to instead allow for the isolation of sailors with infectious diseases. Charon's armament was greatly decreased, limited to four 9-pounder guns on the upper deck and four 6-pounder guns on the quarterdeck. The refit cost £6,874. Charon was recommissioned under the command of Captain George Countess while the work was underway in November 1793. The ship then joined the Channel Fleet in May 1794.

Charon served at the fleet's engagement at the Glorious First of June, with the naval physician Thomas Trotter working on board. The French overestimated the number of British ships of the line at the battle, which the naval historian William James suggests was because from a distance the two-decked Charon also resembled one. Charon did not actively participate in the battle, but sailed to windward of the line of battle alongside the smaller ships and frigates of the fleet. After the battle sick French prisoners with diseases such as typhus and smallpox were sent on board.

Commander Walter Lock replaced Countess in command of Charon in September. The Channel Fleet fought the Battle of Groix on 23 June the following year, with Charon present. Again she was not engaged, having no casualties in the battle. Charon left the fleet in August, changing commanding officers again with Commander James Stevenson joining in October.

=== Leeward Islands ===
Charon sailed to join the Leeward Islands Station on 7 December 1795, where she was used as a store ship. Serving off Barbados alongside the 38-gun frigate HMS Pique, she captured the French 14-gun privateer Lacédémonian on 9 March 1796. Charon was part of the fleet under Rear-Admiral Sir Hugh Christian which captured St Lucia in May. Stevenson was mentioned in dispatches after the final surrender of the island on 25 May. The ship then returned to Britain in November.

=== Irish Rebellion ===
With the ship serving in the English Channel, still a store ship, Stevenson relinquished command of Charon to Commander Thomas Manby on 5 February 1797. The ship was allocated to an expedition preparing to sail under Rear-Admiral Lord Hugh Seymour to the Pacific Ocean, but this was subsequently cancelled. Instead when the Irish Rebellion of 1798 broke out, Charon transported reinforcements over from Britain. The crew was also employed in landing parties to attack Irish rebels on the banks of the River Suir at Waterford, capturing pikes which were subsequently presented to George III. On one particular occasion the ship embarked 1,000 soldiers at Portsmouth, landed them at Guernsey the next day, and then on the third day conveyed another 1,000 soldiers to Waterford.

Charon was also employed in escorting merchant ships, patrolling for privateers, and forming part of the blockade of Le Havre; on 2 March she chased for three hours, and then captured, the French 1-gun privateer lugger Alexandrine. From the start of Manby's command in 1797, Charon escorted a total of 4,753 ships.

=== Mediterranean and Egypt ===
Charon subsequently went to Woolwich for a refit in preparation for overseas service, and Commander Lord Camelford assumed command in October. He was on bad terms with the Admiralty, and Manby was kept on with the ship to superintend Camelford's work. Expecting to be sent to the Mediterranean to assist Captain Sidney Smith in operations around Constantinople and the River Nile, Camelford had special cutting out boats constructed for Charon. In January 1799 he was arrested for attempting to travel to France as a tourist, and was removed from command of Charon. He was replaced by Captain John Mackellar, under whom Charon sailed to the Mediterranean Sea in March.

Charon arrived at Gibraltar on 27 April and from there sailed to Constantinople, conveying a cargo of diplomatic presents. On her return journey the ship escorted merchant ships from Smyrna, Sicily, and Minorca, to Gibraltar. While subsequently sailing from there to Britain, Charon chased a 14-gun privateer schooner which escaped by throwing overboard all her guns, boats, and anchors. Towards the end of the year Charon was employed in the evacuation of the forces engaged in the unsuccessful Anglo-Russian invasion of Holland. Charon was then sent to Sheerness Dockyard where from December to February 1800 she was converted into a troop ship. At a cost of £4,759 this included another armament change, with sixteen 9-pounder guns on the upper deck complemented by four 6-pounder guns still on the quarterdeck. During the refit Commander Richard Bridges took command of Charon.

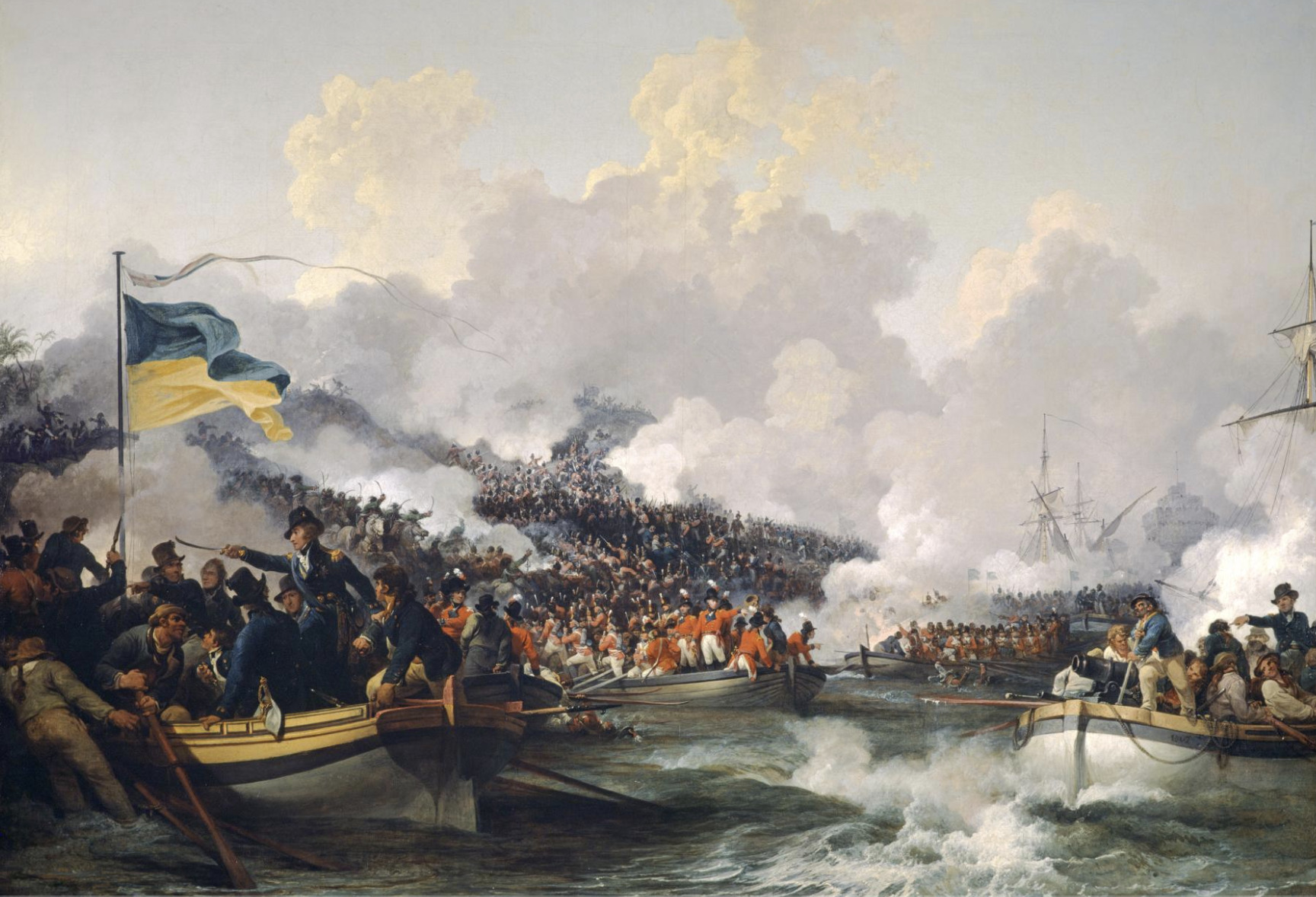
Charon had five men wounded in the landings at the Battle of Abukir

Charon returned to service in the Mediterranean in May 1800. Participating in the blockade of Genoa, on 23 May Charon captured the French ketch St Juan Baptiste. When the city surrendered at the end of the Siege of Genoa on 4 June, Charon was part of the Anglo-Neapolitan squadron which occupied the mole there on the following day. Charon captured two boats, St Antonio and St Maria, on 30 August. The Mediterranean Fleet sailed to the coast of Asia Minor on 31 January 1801, prior to starting the Egypt campaign. On 8 March Charon participated in the landing of the British Army at the Battle of Abukir, having five men wounded during the battle.

Lieutenant Charles Marsh Schomberg replaced Bridges in August and the ship continued through the Peace of Amiens to serve in the Mediterranean, employed transporting French soldiers from Egypt to Malta. When this was completed Charon was sent on a special mission to Tunis, in reward for which Schomberg was promoted out of the ship on 6 August 1803. Lieutenant Edward O'Bryen Drury assumed command in September, and it was under him that Charon returned to Britain, arriving at Portsmouth as escort to a convoy from Malta on 14 January 1804.

=== Fate ===
Charon was paid off to go in ordinary in June before being broken up at Woolwich in December 1805. When the Naval General Service Medal was authorised in 1847, eight members of Charon's crew remained alive to receive a medal clasp for the Glorious First of June, two for Groix, and six for Egypt.
