= George Countess =

British Royal Navy officer (1743–1811)

Rear-Admiral George Countess
- Born: 1743
- Died: 1811 (aged 67–68)
- Military career
- Allegiance: United Kingdom
- Branch: Royal Navy
- Rank: Rear-Admiral
- Commands: HMS Drake; HMS Fortune; HMS Courageux; HMS Charon; HMS Pegasus; HMS Daedalus; HMS Ethalion; HMS Robust
- Conflicts: French Revolutionary Wars; Glorious First of June; Battle of Tory Island

Rear-Admiral George Countess (1743 – 1811) was an officer of the British Royal Navy who saw extensive service in the French Revolutionary Wars.

== Career ==
Made captain in 1790, Countess was in command of HMS Charon in 1794 and witnessed the Glorious First of June from her, although she was not engaged as she was a hospital ship. In 1798, Countess was instrumental in hunting down the French squadron under Jean-Baptiste-François Bompart. This squadron was intending to invade Ireland, and it was only the perseverance of Countess in HMS Ethalion which led the squadron under Sir John Borlase Warren right to the French. Countess was heavily engaged at the victory of the Battle of Tory Island which followed and was given large financial rewards for this service. In 1799 he captured two French 18-gun privateers cruising off Ireland.

Countess was promoted to rear-admiral in 1809, but died in 1811. Point Countess in Alaska is named for him.
