= HMS Firm =

Eight ships of the Royal Navy have been named HMS Firm or Firme.

- The French ship, La Ferme captured in 1702, was renamed HMS Firm for the Royal Navy and given to Russia in 1713.
- HMS Firm (1759), a 60-gun fourth-rate ship of the line, launched on 15 January 1759. She served as a prison hulk at Portsmouth from 1784, until broken up in 1791.
- HMS Firm (1794), a 16-gun floating battery, primarily based at Sheerness, launched in 1794 and disposed of in 1803.
- HMS Firm (1804), a 12-gun Archer-class gun-brig, launched in 1804, and wrecked off the coast of France on 28 June 1811.
- HMS Firme (1805), formerly the 74-gun Spanish ship Ferme captured at the battle of Cape Finisterre (1805), which served as a prison hulk at Plymouth until sold in 1814.
- HMS Firm (1855), a mortar vessel, launched on 1 March 1855, renamed Mortar Vessel 11 later that year, and disposed of in 1858.
- HMS Firm (1856), a gunboat in service until sold in 1871
- HMS Firm (1879), a Forester-class 2nd class gunboat, launched in 1879, and stationed at Queensferry up to 1890.
