= French frigate Immortalité =

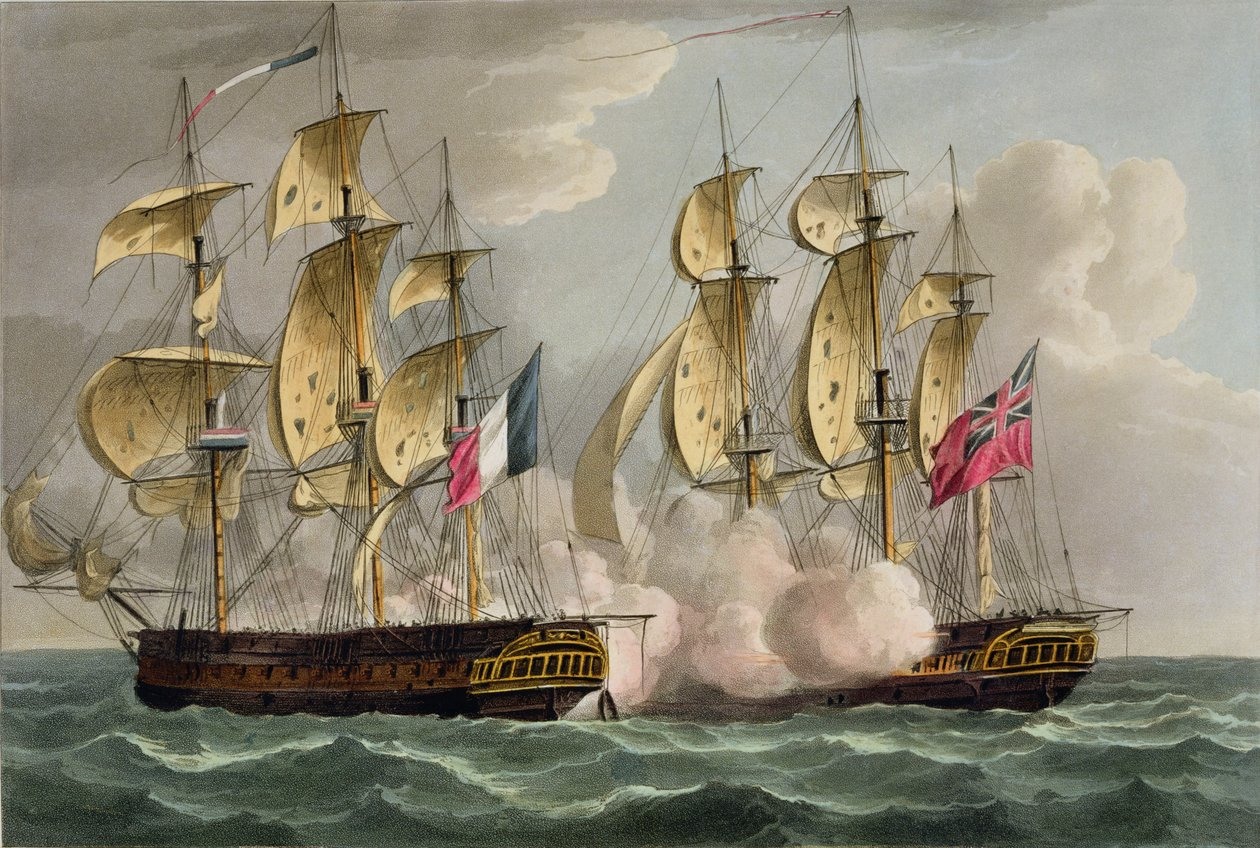
- Immortalité (left) at the action of 20 October 1798

History

France
- Name: Immortalité; (English: 'Immortality')
- Builder: Brest, France
- Laid down: May 1794
- Launched: 7 January 1795
- In service: February 1795
- Captured: 20 October 1798

Great Britain
- Name: HMS Immortalite
- Acquired: 20 October 1798 by capture
- Fate: Broken up in July 1806

General characteristics
- Class & type: Romaine-class frigate
- Displacement: 700 tonnes
- Length: 45.5 m (149 ft 3 in)
- Beam: 11.8 m (38 ft 9 in)
- Draught: 5 m (16 ft 5 in)
- Propulsion: Sail
- Armament: 40 guns: 24 24-pounders; 16 8-pounders
- Armour: Timber

Immortalité was a Romaine-class frigate of the French Navy. She took part in the Expédition d'Irlande, and was captured shortly after the Battle of Tory Island by HMS Fisgard. She was recommissioned in the Royal Navy as HMS Immortalite and had an active career on the Western Squadron.

== French Revolutionary Wars ==
As the merchant ship Monarch, Davidson, master, was sailing to England from Quebec with a cargo of wood, on 16 September 1800 she encountered the French privateer Bellone, which captured her. However, four days later, Immortalite recaptured Monarch, of 645 tons (bm), and sent her into Plymouth.

== Napoleonic Wars ==
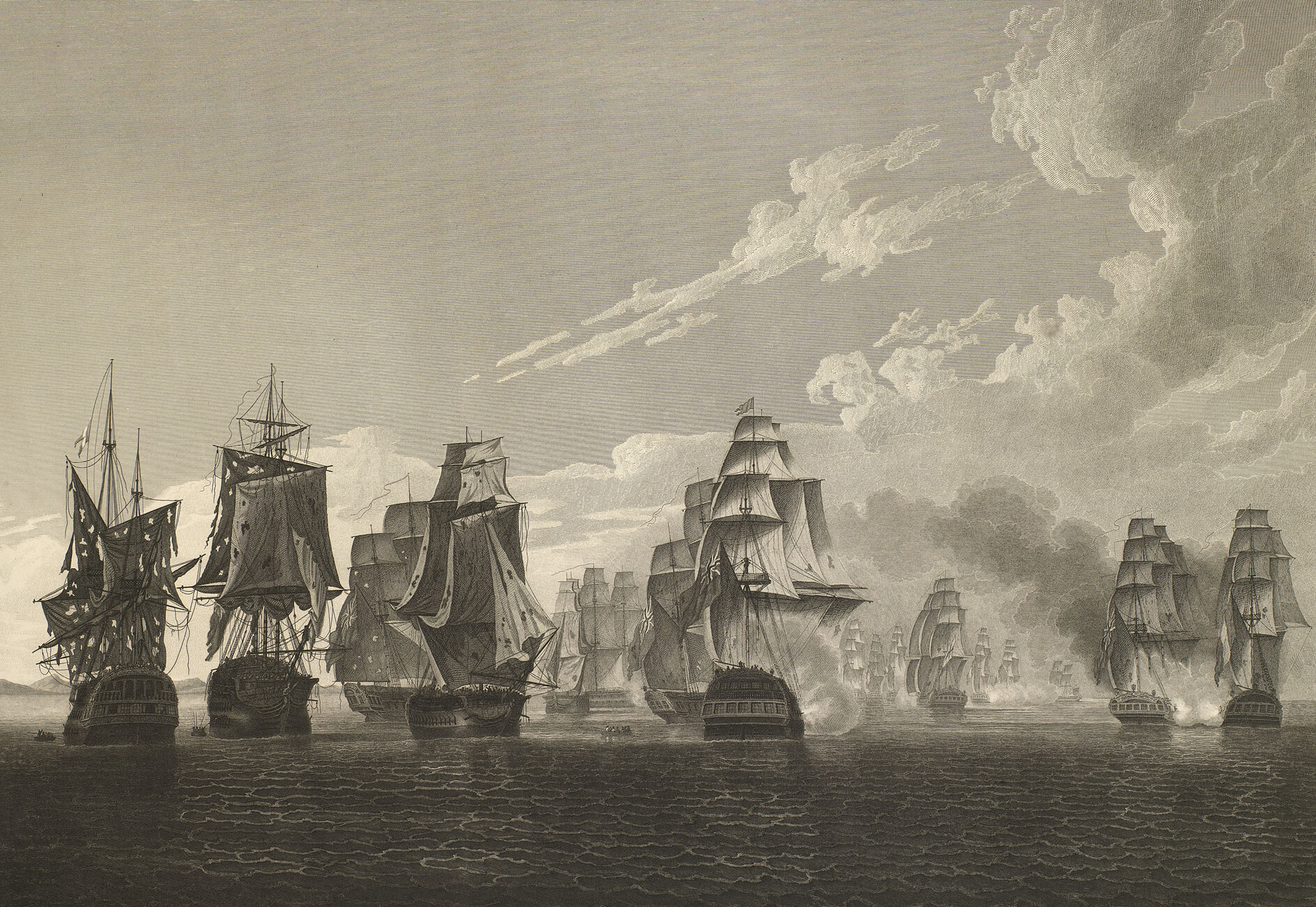
Immortalité at the Battle of Tory Island

In the months before the resumption of war with France, the Navy started preparations that included impressing seamen. The crews of outbound Indiamen were an attractive target. Woodford and Ganges were sitting in the Thames in March 1803, taking their crews on board just prior to sailing. At sunset, a press gang from Immortalite rowed up to Woodford, while boats from HMS Amethyst and HMS Lynx approached Ganges. As the press gangs approached they were noticed, and the crews of both Indiamen were piped to quarters. That is, they assembled on the decks armed with pikes and cutlasses, and anything they could throw.

The officers in charge of the press gangs thought this mere bravado and pulled alongside the Indiamen, only to meet a severe resistance from the crewmen, who had absolutely no desire to serve in the Royal Navy. The men from Immortalite suffered several injuries from shot and pike that were thrown at them, and eventually opened fire with muskets, killing two sailors on Woodford. Even so, the press gangs were not able to get on board either Indiaman, and eventually withdrew some distance. When Woodford's officers finally permitted the press gang from Immortalite to board, all they found on board were a few sickly sailors.

== Fate ==
Immortalite was broken up in July 1806.
