= Thomas Byard =

Captain Sir Thomas Byard
- Born: baptised 25 September 1743; Burton upon Trent, Staffordshire
- Died: 30 October 1798; At sea aboard HMS Foudroyant
- Military career
- Allegiance: United Kingdom
- Branch: Royal Navy
- Rank: Captain
- Conflicts: French Revolutionary Wars; Battle of Camperdown; Battle of Tory Island
- Awards: Knight Bachelor

Captain Sir Thomas Byard (bapt. 25 September 1743 – 30 October 1798) was an officer of the British Royal Navy during the French Revolutionary Wars. He is best known for his service in two significant battles, fighting at the Battle of Camperdown in 1797 and the Battle of Tory Island in 1798. In these engagements Byard was highly praised for his conduct and he contributed materially to both victories. He was also knighted in 1789 for his service to King George III, personally steering the King's barque at the fleet review at Portsmouth in that year.

== Life ==
He was born in September 1743 in Burton-on-Trent the son of Ann and Henry Byard. He was christened at St Modwen's, Burton upon Trent on 25 September.

He passed the lieutenant's exam for the Royal Navy in 1762. However, he was not commissioned until 1773 and only in 1782 received his first command: the fireship, HMS Spitfire.

Byard was promoted to post captain in 1783 at the end of the American Revolutionary War, and remained in service during the ten year Peace of Paris. By 1789, he had become flag captain of the new second rate HMS Impregnable and in this role was tasked with escorting King George III and the royal party during the fleet review. Byard took personal command of the King's barque during the review, steering it himself. So pleased was King George III with his treatment during the day that Byard was knighted as a reward.

The following year, Byard was sent to the Mediterranean in Impregnable under Rear-Admiral Sir Richard Bickerton and remained there after Bickerton's death in 1792 under Admiral Phillips Cosby. In 1793, Impregnable returned to British waters, and Cosby and Byard joined HMS Windsor Castle before moving to HMS Alcide and returning to Britain themselves.

By 1797, Byard was in command of HMS Bedford and took part in October in the Battle of Camperdown, at which a Dutch fleet was defeated off the Dutch coast. Byard was praised for his conduct in the battle and soon afterwards moved to the new 80-gun HMS Foudroyant, participating in the October 1798 campaign against a French invasion of Ireland that was defeated at the Battle of Tory Island. Foudroyant was too slow to participate in most of the battle, but did engage a number of French ships during the course of the engagement, and Byard was again praised. He died on board Foudroyant on 31 October 1798 and is buried at St Budeaux Church, in Plymouth.

== Family ==
In 1773 at Stoke Damerel Church he married Susanna Tickell, by whom he had three daughters. The family lived at Mount Tamar near Yelverton.

The eldest was Mary Ann Stuart; in 1797 she married George Sheppard, a clothier from Frome. Two of her sons, Thomas and Alfred, also bore the name Byard, a tradition continued among their descendants.
