= Edward Brace =

British Royal Naval officer

Vice-Admiral Sir Edward Brace KCB
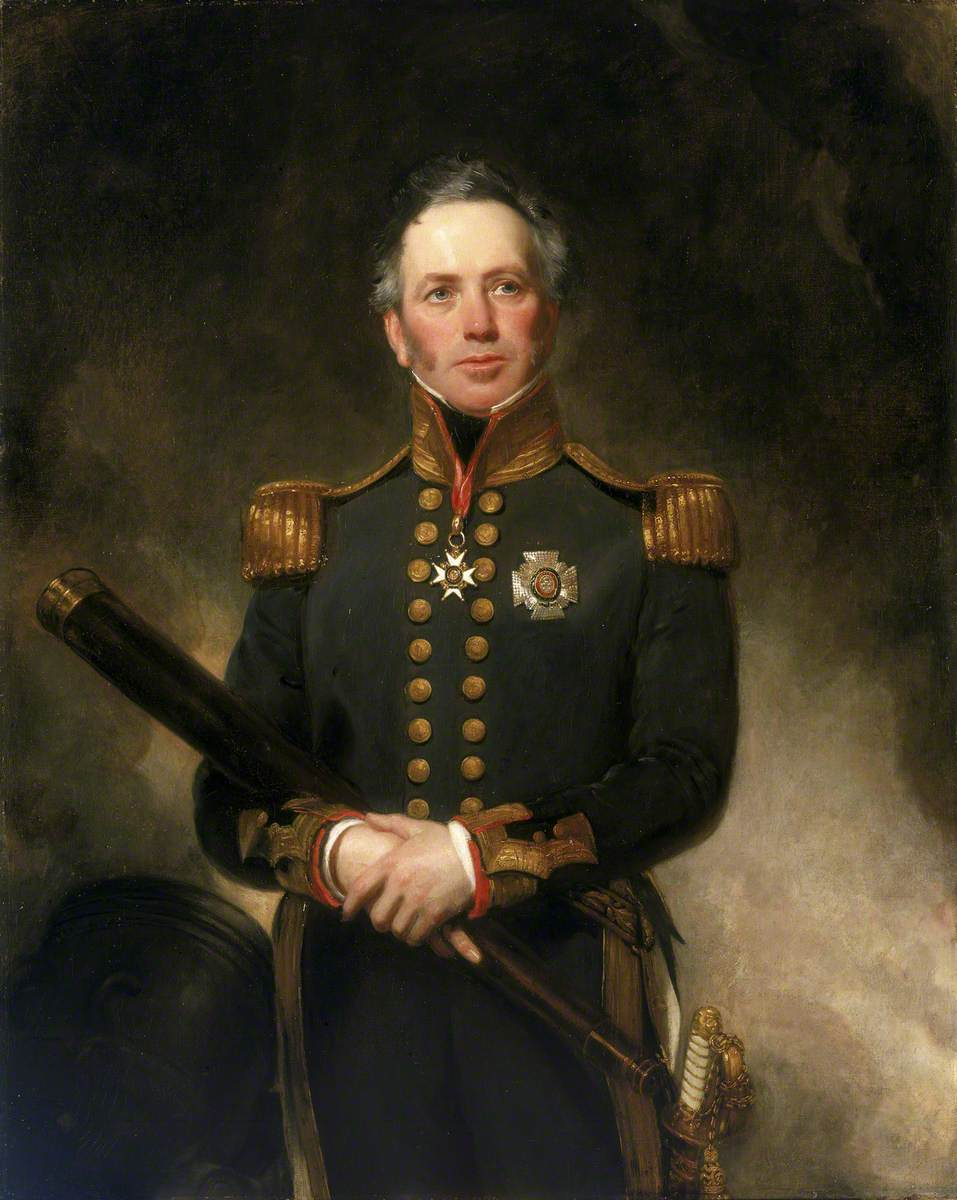
- Rear-Admiral Sir Edward Brace, 1837; Henry William Pickersgill
- Born: 2 June 1770; Kimbolton, Herefordshire
- Died: 26 December 1843 (aged 73); Nore, Kent
- Military career
- Allegiance: United Kingdom
- Branch: Royal Navy
- Service years: 1781 – 1843
- Rank: Royal Navy Vice-Admiral
- Commands: Nore Command
- Conflicts: French Revolutionary War; Expédition d'Irlande; Capture of Loire; Napoleonic Wars; Action of 19 May 1808; Bombardment of Algiers
- Awards: Knight Commander of the Order of the Bath; Military William Order; Order of Charles III; Order of Saints Maurice and Lazarus

Vice-Admiral Sir Edward Brace KCB (bap. 2 June 1770 – 26 December 1843) was a senior officer of the British Royal Navy during the French Revolutionary and Napoleonic Wars. Most of his career was spent as a successful independent captain, and he was three times involved in successful actions against French or Dutch frigates, resulting in rapid promotion. After the end of the Napoleonic Wars, Brace commanded the first rate HMS Impregnable at the Bombardment of Algiers in 1816, but made a serious mistake in his navigation and exposed his ship to the port's defences unnecessarily. As a result, he suffered 210 casualties and his career suffered as a result. Despite this setback, he continued to rise during the 1820s and gradually became an admiral and a knight. In the 1830s he was made commander in chief at the Nore and died on station in 1843.

== Life ==
Edward Brace was born in June 1770, the son of Francis Brace of Stagbatch. Aged 11 he was entered on the books of the frigate HMS Artois as a captain's servant, progressing through the ranks until entered as a midshipman in 1785. In 1787, Brace joined HMS Victory before moving to HMS Gorgon, HMS Edgar and then HMS Crown over the following year. In 1790 he sailed for the East Indies and there served on HMS Minerva and HMS Ariel, returning to Europe in 1792 as a lieutenant. In January 1793, Brace moved to HMS Iris and in 1794 joined the ship of the line HMS Polyphemus, based at Cork. In 1795 he was briefly given an independent command in the cutter HMS Hazard, but returned to Polyphemus within the year. Polyphemus was then heavily engaged in the Expédition d'Irlande during the winter of 1796–1797, when a French invasion fleet was broken up by storms off Southern Ireland. Polyphemus was able to chase and capture the frigate Tartu 5 January.

In consequence of the capture, Brace was given command of the brig HMS Kangaroo in June 1797 and in October 1798 was heavily involved in the events surrounding the Battle of Tory Island, bringing warning to the squadron at Cork of the approaching French fleet and subsequently assisting in the capture of the frigate Loire as the French fleet broke up in the aftermath of the battle. In 1800, Brace was promoted to post captain and the same year married Elizabeth Fisher in Brockhampton. In 1801 he took command of the second rate HMS Neptune, the flagship of Vice-Admiral James Gambier and in 1802 moved to command HMS Camilla before returning to Gambier's service on HMS Isis off Newfoundland later in the same year.

In 1803, Brace took command of HMS Dreadnought, flagship of Admiral William Cornwallis in the Channel Fleet and a few months later took an independent command in the frigate HMS Castor. In 1805 he moved to Isis again and then to HMS Virginie. While serving off Ireland in May 1808, Virginie encountered and defeated a Dutch frigate name Gelderland at the action of 19 May 1808. In May 1810 Virginie was paid off and Brace appointed to HMS St Albans off Cádiz. In March 1811, Brace was in command of the transports bringing Lieutenant-General Thomas Graham's soldiers to Tarifa and managed to land his military stores in heavy surf, allowing Graham to participate in the successful Battle of Barrossa. In December 1811, Brace moved to HMS Berwick and for the next three years operated against the French, Spanish and Italian coasts, including the capture of the cities of Genoa and Gaeta.

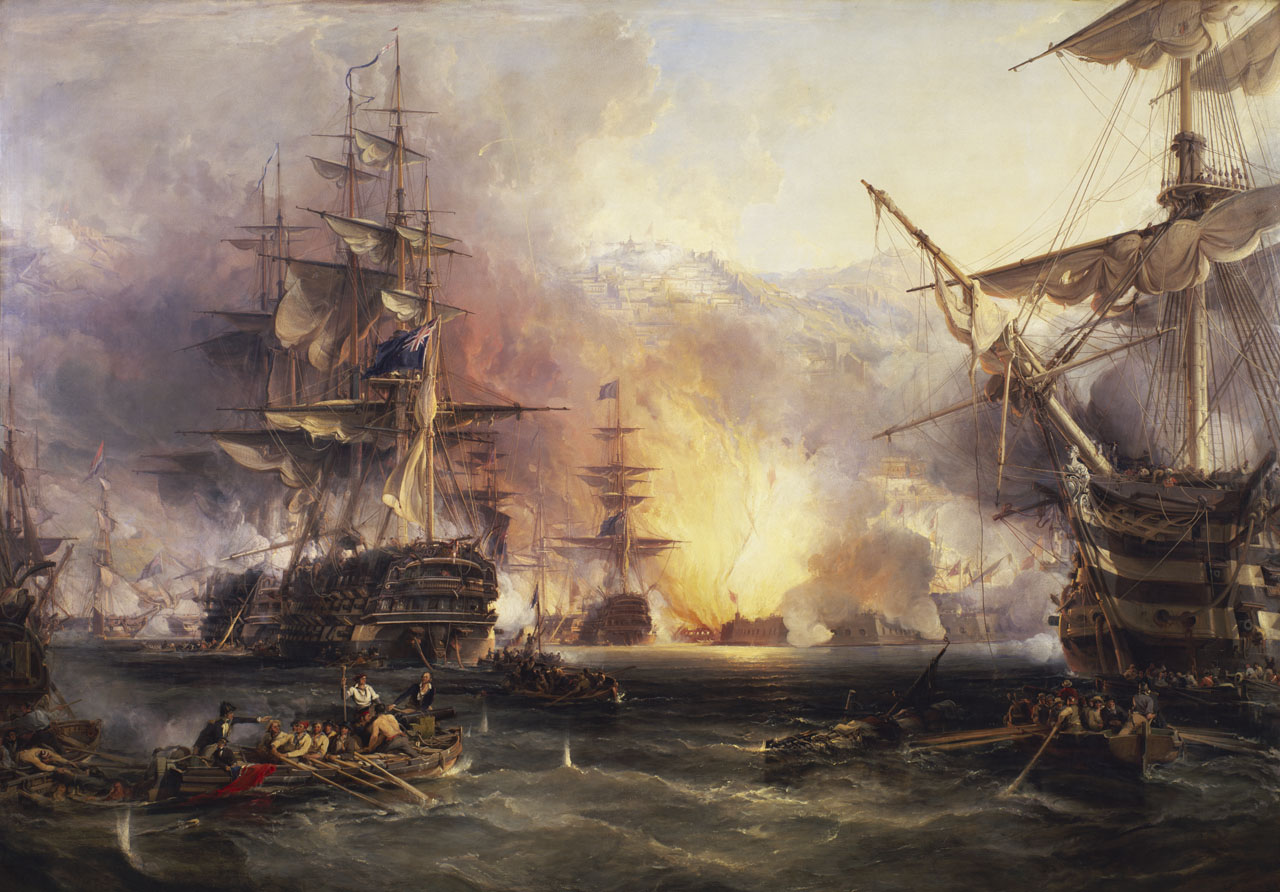
Bombardment of Algiers, 27 August 1816, by George Chambers (painter); The bow of Impregnable is visible at the right front

At the end of the Napoleonic Wars, Brace remained in service and took command of the second rate HMS Impregnable under Rear-Admiral David Milne, participating in the Bombardment of Algiers in 1816. During the battle, Brace miscalculated the position of his ship and anchored too close to the gun batteries defending the port, preventing his men from depressing their guns sufficiently to inflict any damage on the fort while coming under heavy bombardment themselves. Impregnable suffered 210 casualties in the engagement and Brace was blamed for the losses and refused any form of reward from the British government. Instead he was awarded the Military William Order and the Order of Saints Maurice and Lazarus from the Dutch and Sardinian governments and later presented with the Order of Charles III by the Spanish government for his services during the Peninsular War in 1811.

Despite the setback to his career at Algiers, Brace continued to slowly rise, becoming a rear-admiral in 1830 and appointed Knight Commander of the Order of the Bath in 1834, although he was denied any seagoing commands. In 1838 he became a vice-admiral and in 1841 he was appointed Commander-in-Chief, The Nore, where he died in 1843.

== Notes ==
Military offices
Preceded by Sir Henry Digby	Commander-in-Chief, The Nore; 1841–1844	Succeeded by Sir John White
