= French schooner Biche (1798) =

Naval vessel in action during the French Revolutionary Wars

History

France
- Name: Biche
- Namesake: hind
- Builder: Brest
- Laid down: April 1798
- Launched: 18 August 1798
- In service: September 1798
- Fate: Decommissioned 1803

General characteristics
- Class & type: Agile-class schooner
- Displacement: 65 tonnes
- Length: 26 m (85 ft)
- Beam: 6.6 m (22 ft)
- Draught: 2.5 m (8 ft 2 in)
- Propulsion: Sail
- Armament: 8 guns
- Armour: Timber

Biche was an 8-gun Agile-class schooner of the French Navy.

She took part in the Expédition d'Irlande and in the Battle of Tory Island.

She was decommissioned in 1803.
