= HMS Terrible (1785) =

Ship of the line of the Royal Navy

History

Great Britain
- Name: HMS Terrible
- Ordered: 13 December 1781
- Builder: Wells, Rotherhithe
- Laid down: 7 January 1783
- Launched: 28 March 1785
- Fate: Broken up, 1836

General characteristics
- Class & type: Culloden-class ship of the line
- Tons burthen: 167917/94 (bm) )
- Length: 170 ft (52 m) (gundeck)
- Beam: 47 ft 2 in (14.38 m)
- Depth of hold: 19 ft 11 in (6.07 m)
- Propulsion: Sails
- Sail plan: Full-rigged ship
- Armament: 74 guns: Gundeck: 28 × 32 pdrs; Upper gundeck: 28 × 18 pdrs; Quarterdeck: 14 × 9 pdrs; Forecastle: 4 × 9 pdrs

HMS Terrible was a 74-gun third rate ship of the line of the Royal Navy, launched on 28 March 1785 at Rotherhithe.

In December 1813 she was paid off and placed in ordinary at Sheerness Dockyard. She remained out of service until 1829, other than a nine-month period between August 1822 and May 1823 when she acted as a receiving ship for volunteers and pressed men. From 1829 to 1836 she served as a coal depot for Navy steamships. Declared surplus even to this limited requirement, she was brought to Deptford Dockyard and broken up in March 1836.
