= HMS Robust (1764) =

Ship of the line of the Royal Navy

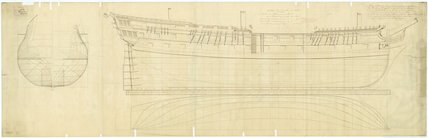
- Plan of Robust

History

Great Britain
- Name: HMS Robust
- Ordered: 16 December 1761
- Builder: Barnard, Harwich
- Launched: 25 October 1764
- Fate: Broken up, 1817
- Notes: Harbour service from 1812

General characteristics
- Class & type: Ramillies-class ship of the line
- Tons burthen: 1624 bm
- Length: 168 ft 6 in (51.36 m) (gundeck)
- Beam: 46 ft 11 in (14.30 m)
- Depth of hold: 19 ft 9 in (6.02 m)
- Propulsion: Sails
- Sail plan: Full-rigged ship
- Armament: Gundeck: 28 × 32-pounder guns; Upper gundeck: 28 × 18-pounder guns; QD: 14 × 9-pounder guns; Fc: 4 × 9-pounder guns

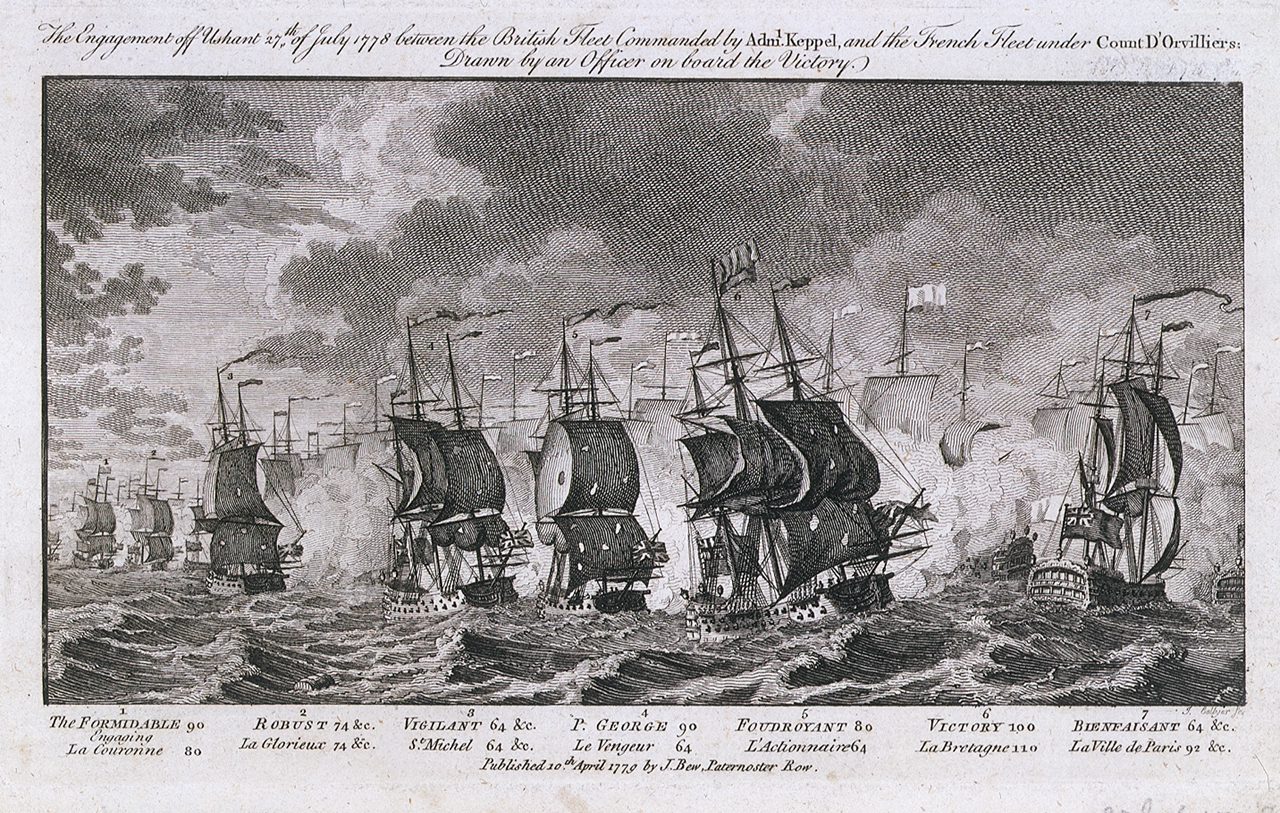
Robust (second left) at the Battle of Ushant, 1778

HMS Robust was a 74-gun third-rate ship of the line of the Royal Navy, built by John Barnard and launched on 25 October 1764 at Harwich. She was the first vessel of the Royal Navy to bear the name. (Note: According to J.J. College's Ships of the Royal Navy, Vol 1, 1987, Naval Institute Press, Annapolis, Maryland there was also a screw second rate laid down on 10 October 1859, but work was suspended 10 October 1861 and the ship cancelled 1872. In volume 2 of this book is described another vessel named HMS Robust, a fleet tug of October 1971.)

== Service history ==
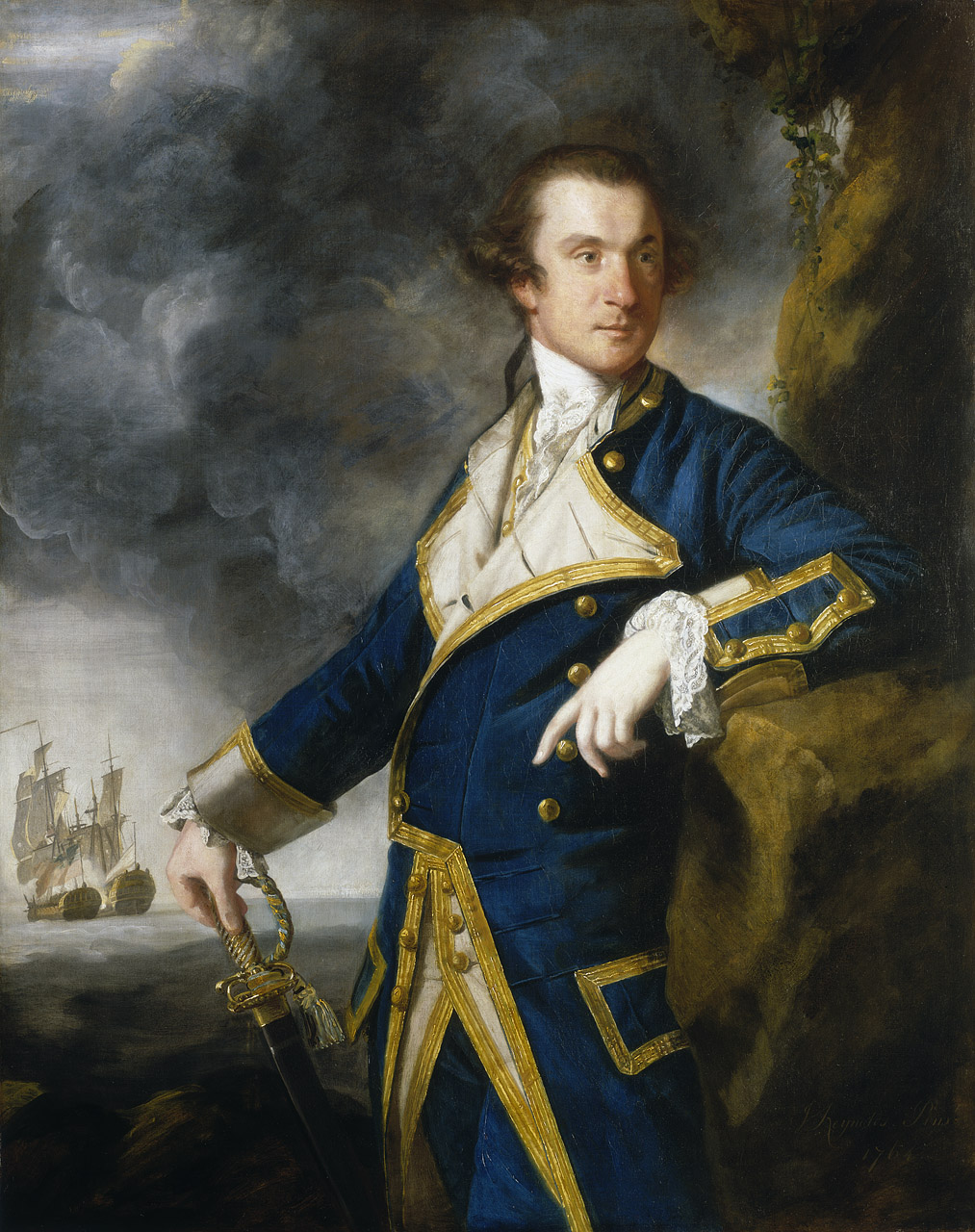
Portrait of Alexander Hood by Joshua Reynolds Hood was her commander at the Battle of Ushant in 1778

In 1778 she was at the Battle of Ushant in Palliser's division of the fleet. Her captain, Alexander Hood, took Palliser's side in the subsequent court martial known as "the Keppel affair".

Robust was part of the fleet under Lord Hood that occupied Toulon in August 1793. With HMS Courageux, Meleager, Tartar and Egmont, she covered the landing, on 27 August, of 1500 troops sent to remove the republicans occupying the forts guarding the port. Once the forts were secure, the remainder of Hood's fleet, accompanied by 17 Spanish ships-of-the-line which had just arrived, sailed into the harbour.

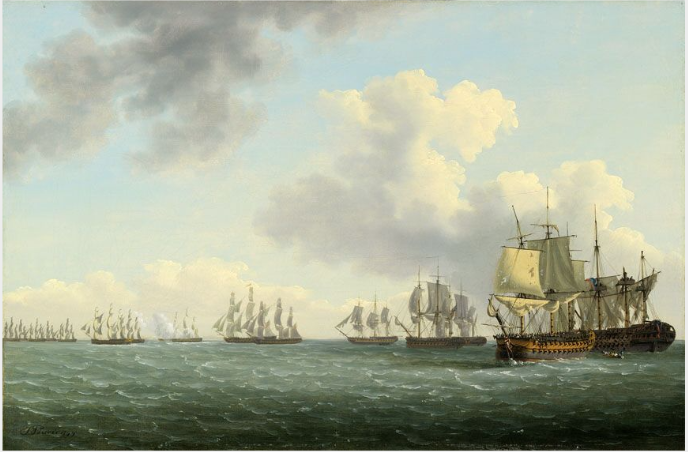
The Robust taking possession of the Hoche off Tory Island, 1798

On 12 October 1798 she captured the French ship Hoche while under the command of Sir John Warren at the Battle of Tory Island.

On 21 July 1801, the boats of Robust, Beaulieu, Uranie and Doris succeeded in boarding and cutting out the French naval corvette Chevrette, which was armed with 20 guns and had 350 men on board (crew and troops placed on board in expectation of the attack). Also, Chevrette was under the batteries of Bay of Cameret. The hired armed cutter Telemachus placed herself in the Goulet and thereby prevented the French from bringing reinforcements by boat to Chevrette.

The action was a sanguinary one. The British lost 11 men killed, 57 wounded, and one missing; Chevrette lost 92 officers, seamen and troops killed, including her first captain, and 62 seamen and troops wounded. In 1847 the Admiralty awarded the Naval General Service Medal with clasp "21 JULY BOAT SERVICE 1801" to surviving claimants from the action.

== Fate ==
Robust was employed on harbour service from 1812, and was broken up in 1817.
