= Daniel Savary =

French admiral (1743–1808)

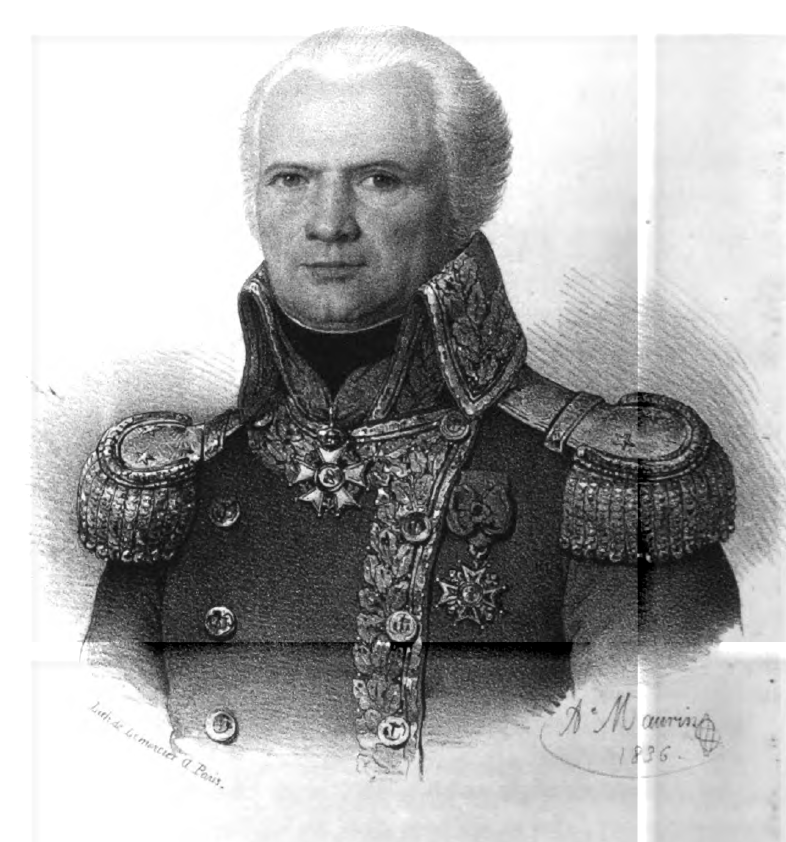

André Daniel Savary (French pronunciation: [ɑ̃dʁe danjɛl savaʁi]; b. Salles, 1 February 1743; d. Mauzé-sur-le-Mignon, 22 November 1808) was a French naval officer and admiral.

He was orphaned at age 4, Savary was raised by his uncle. At the age of 18, he signed up for the Merchant Marine (including service with the French East India Company), and later to the French Royal Navy. He fought under Suffren in India.

He was promoted to lieutenant in 1791, Capitaine de corvette in 1798, commodore in 1798 and counter-admiral in 1802. He died in 1808.
