= French corvette Réolaise =

18th c. French corvette

History

France
- Name: Réolaise
- Namesake: La Réole
- Laid down: 1788
- Fate: Destroyed on 17 November 1800

General characteristics
- Type: Ship-corvette in French service
- Sail plan: Full-rigged ship
- Complement: 6 to 8 officers and 90 to 95 men
- Armament: 18 × 4-pounder guns

Réolaise was a 20-gun ship-corvette of the French Navy. Originally a British merchantman, she was built in England, and captured by the French and taken into naval service in 1793. She served as a convoy escort until she ran aground in combat in 1800 at Port Navalo; her crew scuttled her by fire.

== Service ==
In August 1793, the French Navy requisitioned Réolaise at Bordeaux and brought her into naval service. She carried eighteen 4-pounder guns and under Enseigne de Vaisseau Tanay escorted convoys between Bordeaux and Île de Ré. In 1794, she escorted convoys between Brest and Pasajes, before joining up with the fleet preparing for the Croisière du Grand Hiver.

After returning to Brest, Réolaise resumed her escort duties, sailing between Brest and Pasajes. In February 1796, after Tanays was promoted to Lieutenant, she escorted convoys to the Pertuis d'Antioche, returning to Brest in August.

In April 1797, Réolaise was at Saint Martin de Ré to escort a convoy bound for Brest, and from there to ferry wine to Lorient. On 11 August she encountered a British squadron at Les Sables d'Olonne, but succeeded in escaping. She cruised under Tanays again in August 1799 in Quiberon Bay.

== Fate ==
On 3 June 1800, Réolaise departed Lorient under Lieutenant Chaunay-Duclos, escorting a 60-sail convoy bound for Nantes. On 16 November, in the Gulf of Morbihan, the convoy encountered a British squadron under Captain Sir Richard Strachan comprising the ship of the line Captain, the frigate Magicienne, and the three hired armed cutters Suworow, Nile, and Lurcher. After securing the merchantmen under her guard, Réolaise fought a running battle and eventually ran aground near Port Navalo on 17 November. Réolaise was then scuttle by fire, either by the British, or by her own crew. Chaunay received commendation for his action from Minister Forfait.

== See also ==
- List of ships captured in the 18th century
