= Hired armed cutter Lurcher =

12-gun cutter

History

Great Britain
- Name: Lurcher
- Commissioned: 15 August 1795
- Fate: Captured, 15 January 1801

General characteristics
- Type: Cutter
- Tons burthen: 10269/94 (bm)
- Complement: 40
- Armament: 12 × 3-pounder guns

His Majesty's Hired armed cutter Lurcher was a 12-gun cutter that served the Royal Navy from 15 August 1795 until 15 January 1801 when a French privateer captured her in the Channel.

- On 6 June 1793, the cutter Lurcher, of 100 tons burthen, eight 3 and 4-pounder guns, and under the command of Christopher Heayott, received a Letter of Marque.

== Naval service ==
On 1 April 1798, Lurcher and the hired armed cutter Nimrod recaptured the Roebuck packet, which the French privateer Adelaide had captured on 20 March. Lurcher and Nimrod sent Roebuck into Plymouth.

In 1799, Lurcher was under the command of Lieutenant J. Betts, and stationed at Portsmouth.

Lurcher shared, with many other British warships, in the capture of the French privateer Aimable Victoire on 29 January 1799. The actual captor, after a chase of eight and a half hours, was Triton. Aimable Victoire was armed with 16 brass 8-pounder guns and two iron 6-pounder guns, and had a crew of 86 men. She was on her first cruise, was one day out of Cherbourg, and had not captured anything. (Note: French sources give her name as Aimable Victor and report that she was active in the Channel in 1798.)

In May, Lurcher, still under Bett's command, landed at the mouth of the River Shannon to procure fresh provisions for HMS Royal George, Admiral Lord Bridport's flagship.

On 19 June Lurcher, Lieutenant Robert Forbes, came into Plymouth from Brest, with damage that she had sustained in an engagement with a French cutter. Lurcher had succeeded in cutting out the French cutter from the Penmarks.

On 13 November 1800, the hired armed cutters Nile and Lurcher captured the French brig Prothée. Five days later they captured a French privateer brig of 14 guns. Prize money was due to be paid on 10 July 1801 in Plymouth.

Two weeks later, on 23 November, Captain Sir Richard Strachan in Captain chased a French convoy in to the Morbihan where it sheltered under the protection of shore batteries and the 20-gun corvette Réolaise. (Note: Réolaise was a British merchant vessel built in England in 1788 that the French purchased or seized, and that the French Navy had requisitioned at Bordeaux in August 1793. French records show her as having a crew of 103 men and being armed with eighteen 4-pounder guns.) Magicienne was able to force the corvette onto the shore at Port Navalo, though she got off again. The hired armed cutter Suworow then towed in four boats with Lieutenant Hennah of Captain and a cutting-out party of seamen and marines. The hired armed cutters Nile and Lurcher towed in four more boats from Magicienne. Although the cutting-out party landed under heavy fire of grape and musketry, it was able to set the corvette on fire; shortly thereafter she blew up. Only one British seaman, a crewman from Suworow, was killed. However, Suworow's sails and rigging were so badly cut up that Captain had to tow her. A French report of the action stated that Captain Duclos, seeing the approach of the British, ran Réolaise on shore and burnt her.

On 7 December 1800, Nile discovered a convoy of 15 or 16 small vessels coming round the point of Croisic near the mouth of the river Vilaine in Quiberon Bay. Lurcher joined Nile and together the two cutters captured or destroyed nine vessels at a cost of only one man wounded on Lurcher, despite fire from shore batteries. The three vessels that fell to Lurcher were all sailing from Nantes to Yannes with wine from Nantes. The three vessels were:

- Maria Joseph, Martin Beroist, master, of two men and eight tons. Lurcher captured her.
- Eponine, Yine Le Frank, of three men and 13 tons. Lurcher drove her on shore on Houat with the loss of her cargo.
- Bon Secour, Yine Nicolane, of two men and eight tons. Lurcher sank her at anchor, but after saving her cargo.

== Fate ==
In 1801 Lurcher was still under the command of Lieutenant Forbes when a 16-gun French privateer captured her. Lurcher had been believed wrecked in a gale, but a letter from Excellent dated 24 February at Lorient arrived at Portsmouth on 2 March. A flag of truce vessel had reported that Lurcher was at Lorient after a French privateer of superior force had captured her "after a gallant action."
