= HMS Nile =

Three ships of the Royal Navy have borne the name HMS Nile, after the Battle of the Nile in 1798:

- HMS Nile (1806) was a 12-gun cutter purchased in 1806. This may have been the former hired armed cutter Nile. HMS Nile was put up for sale in October 1810, and sold, but the purchaser rejected her; she was subsequently broken up in 1811.
- HMS Nile (1839) was a 92-gun second-rate ship of the line launched in 1839. She was converted to screw propulsion in 1854, renamed HMS Conway in 1876 whilst on loan as a training ship, and was burnt in 1956.
- HMS Nile (1888) was a Trafalgar-class ironclad launched in 1888 and sold in 1912.

In addition, the Royal Navy base at Ras el-Tin Point, Alexandria, Egypt, which operated between April 1939 and June 1946, was officially referred to as HMS Nile.

== See also ==
- Hired armed cutter Nile
- Hired armed lugger Nile
