= Action of 10 December 1800 =

- Part of the Napoleonic Wars
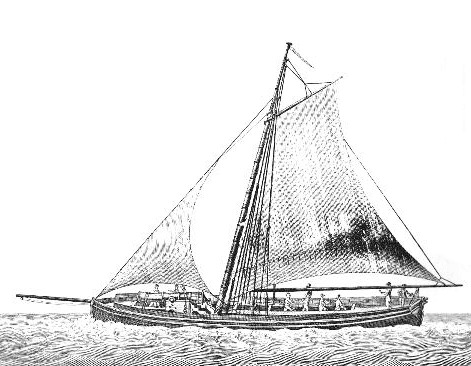
- Spanish Gun-boat circa 1800
Date	10 December 1800
Location	Bay of Gibraltar
Result	Spanish victory

Belligerents
Spain	Great Britain

Commanders and leaders
Miguel Villalba	Lieut. Charles I. Niven

Strength
1 gun-boat (3 guns); 43 men	1 brig (18 guns); 58 men

Casualties and losses
Unknown, minor	1 brig captured 3 dead 8 wounded

The action of 10 December 1800 was a minor engagement of the Napoleonic Wars in which the Spanish privateer gunboat San Francisco Javier, alias Poderoso, under Don Miguel Villalba, captured a hired brig of the Royal Navy commanded by Lieutenant Charles Niven (or Nevin).

On 20 December the British hired armed brig Sir Thomas Pasley (or Admiral Pasley, or Pasley), left Plymouth, England with despatches for Lisbon, Gibraltar, and Malta. After calling at Lisbon, Sir Thomas Pasley was off Ceuta when on 10 December a Spanish gunboat approached using sails and sweeps. (Note: Hepper, using British naval court-martial records, reports the date as 9 December. Most sources, such as Gosset, report the date as 10 December.)

At the time of the engagement Pasley was armed with two 6-pounder guns and fourteen 12-pounder carronades. She had a crew of 45 men.

The Spanish gunboat, which was armed with one long 24-pounder and two 6-pounder guns, placed herself astern of Pasley and proceeded to fire on the brig. The wind died down, preventing Pasley from maneuvering to bring her two 6-pounder bow-chasers to bear. The British tried to move the guns to the stern, but the carronades left them no space in which to place the guns. The British sailors were left to respond to the Spanish cannon fire with no more than small arms fire.

Spanish boarding parties took the brig at the third attempt, having shot away the British halyard during the skirmish. Niven had been wounded in three places, and the master was also badly wounded. In addition, the British had lost three other sailors killed and six more wounded. (Note: Other references state that there were two Spanish gun-boats, and that Niven struck to the Spanish after having thrown overboard the despatches he was carrying.) The Spaniards took their prize to Ceuta, and then Algeciras.

Niven faced a court-martial for the loss of his ship and was honourably acquitted.
