= HMS George =

Thirteen vessels of the Royal Navy and its predecessors have borne the name George. (Note: In accordance with Wikipedia naming conventions, this index does not use the prefix HMS for ships before 1660. The term "His Majesty's Ship" was introduced around 1660 and was routinely abbreviated HMS from about 1780 onwards.)

- George was a ship built in 1338 on the River Hamble.
- George (1416) was a Genoese carrack of 600 tons (bm) that the British captured on 15 August 1416 and that the navy sold on 10 August 1425
- George was a balinger of 120 tons (bm), built at Smallhithe in 1420 and sold in August 1425.
- George (1564) was a ship of 80 tons (bm) and 28 guns, purchased in 1564 and listed until 1557.
- George was a hoy of 50 tons (bm), listed 1564–1585.
- George was a hoy of 100 tons (bm), purchased in 1588 and listed until 1603.
- George was a fire ship listed in 1652.
- HMS George (1672) was a Dutch dogger of 8 guns, captured in 1672 and sold in 1674.
- HMS George was a fire ship of six guns and 393 tons (bm), purchased in 1672 and sunk as a foundation at Sheerness in 1674.
- HMS George (1755) was a schooner on the Canadian Lakes listed in 1755 that the French captured at Oswego on 14 August 1756.
- George was a hired ship's tender listed in 1774 and wrecked on 26 December 1776 in poor weather at Piscatagua, New Hampshire.
- HMS George (1796) was a sloop of six guns and 105 tons (bm), captured in 1796 that two Spanish privateers captured in the West Indies on 3 January 1798.
- HMS George (1794) was a sailing barge of 61 tons (bm) and two or three guns purchased in March 1794 and sold in October 1798.
