= Battalion (disambiguation) =

A battalion is a military unit of several hundred soldiers.

Battalion may also refer to:

- Battalion (Sweden), a 17th- and 18th-century combat unit
- The Battalion, the student newspaper of Texas A&M University
- Battalion (comics), a number of characters in comics
- Brampton Battalion, a Canadian major junior ice hockey team
- Battalion (1795 ship) was launched at Whitby in 1795. A French privateer captured her in 1797.
- Battalion (1927 film), a silent Czech film
- Battalion (1937 film), a remake of the silent Czech film
- Battalion (2015 film), a Russian film
- Battalion, 2012 novel by Adam Hamdy
