= Molly (ship) =

Several vessels have been named Molly:

- Molly (1759 ship) was launched in the Thirteen Colonies in 1759, probably under the same name. From 1776 on she was a whaler, sailing from Kingston-on-Hull. She made annual whaling voyages until 1806 when a French frigate captured her.
- Molly (1769 ship) was launched in 1769 at Liverpool. In 1776 she made one voyage as a slave ship in the triangular trade in enslaved persons. After, and possibly before, she was a West Indiaman. While sailing under a letter of marque, she captured some notable prizes. Two French frigates captured her on 4 September 1782.
- Molly (1770 ship) was launched at Liverpool in 1770. Between 1777 and 1779 she made three voyages to the British northern whale fishery. Afterwards, she sailed as a West Indiaman. From 1779 she sailed under a letter of marque, and captured one prize. Around the end of 1781 she engaged in a single ship action in which her captain was killed. She was captured but her captor gave her up. She was last listed in 1783.
- Molly was launched in Liverpool in 1775 as Badger. Badger made one voyage as a slave ship in the triangular trade in enslaved people. New owners renamed her Molly in 1778 and sailed her as a West Indiaman. In 1779 she repelled an American privateer in a sanguinary single ship action. Her owners renamed her Lydia. While trading with Tortola she captured one or two prizes. Lydia was herself captured in 1782.
- Molly (1778 ship) was launched at Liverpool in 1778 as a slave ship. Between 1778 and 1807 she made 18 complete voyages in the triangular trade in enslaved persons. During this period she also suffered one major maritime incident and captured two ships. After the end of Britain's involvement in the trans-Atlantic slave trade, Molly became a merchantman trading with the West Indies, Africa, Brazil, Nova Scotia, and Africa again. She was last listed in 1832, giving her a 54-year career.
- HM hired armed ship Molly caught fire on 7 June 1781, exploded, and sank off Point Lynas, Anglesey. There were about 40 survivors.
- Molly (1783 ship) was launched at Halifax, Nova Scotia, in 1783. From at least 1785 on she sailed from Lancaster as a West Indiaman. In 1792 she made one voyage as a Liverpool-based slave ship in the triangular trade in enslaved people. A French squadron captured her in 1794 at the outset of her second slave voyage, before she could acquire any slaves.
