= Gibraltar (ship) =

Several vessels have been named Gibraltar, for Gibraltar:

- Gibraltar (1786 ship) was launched in France in 1776, almost certainly under another name. Between 1787 and 1795, she was a whaler in the northern whale (Greenland) fishery. A French privateer captured her in February 1796, as she was on her way to the fishery, and burnt her. Her loss led the British government to increase the protection of the outward-bound whaling fleet.
- Gibraltar, of 764 GRT, was an iron screw-steamer that Cole Bros. of Shields, launched in 1873. A Swede purchased her. On 19 November 1881, she was wrecked at Lonstrup, south of Hirtshals, Denmark, on a voyage from Sunderland to Stockholm with a cargo of coal.
- CSS Sumter, converted from the 1859-built merchant steamer Habana, was the first steam cruiser of the Confederate States Navy during the American Civil War. She operated as a commerce raider in the Caribbean and in the Atlantic Ocean against Union merchant shipping between July and December 1861, taking eighteen prizes until Union Navy warships trapped her in Gibraltar. She was sold in 1862, to the British office of a Confederate merchant and renamed Gibraltar, successfully running the Union blockade in 1863, and surviving the war.
- Gibraltar, of 3,803 GRT, was a steel screw-steamer that Russell & Co., Port Glasgow, launched on 14 November 1901. On 12 September 1917, SM UC-17 torpedoed her at 41.17°N 5.50°E, 100 miles SE by S of Cape de Creus. Gibraltar was sailing from Karachi to Marseille.

== See also ==
- HMS Gibraltar – one of seven vessels of the British Royal Navy
