= HMS Triton (1796) =

Experimental frigate of the Royal Navy in service 1796–1814/20

- 1797 painting of Triton in three views

History

Great Britain
- Name: HMS Triton
- Namesake: Triton
- Ordered: 7 April 1796
- Cost: £20,722
- Laid down: April 1796
- Launched: 5 September 1796
- Completed: 31 October 1796
- Commissioned: September 1796
- Fate: Sold, 3 November 1814 OR broken up, 1820

General characteristics
- Class & type: Triton-class fifth-rate frigate
- Tons burthen: 855 80/94 (bm)
- Length: 142 ft (43.3 m) (gundeck); 123 ft 0 1/8 in (37.5 m) (keel)
- Beam: 36 ft 2 in (11 m)
- Propulsion: Sails
- Complement: 220
- Armament: Gundeck: 26 × 12-pounder guns; QD: 4 × 6-pounder guns + 6 × 24-pounder carronades; Fc: 2 × 6-pounder guns + 2 × 24-pounder carronades

HMS Triton was a 32-gun fifth-rate frigate of the Royal Navy designed by James Gambier and launched in 1796 at Deptford. Triton was an experimental ship and the only one built to that design; she was constructed out of fir due to wartime supply shortages of more traditional materials and had some unusual features such as no tumblehome. Her namesake was the Greek god Triton, a god of the sea. She was commissioned in June 1796 under Captain John Gore, with whom she would spend the majority of her active service, to serve in the Channel in the squadron of Sir John Warren.

Triton was a successful ship, serving throughout the majority of the French Revolutionary Wars and Napoleonic Wars in several capacities. She took a large number of warships and traders as prizes in the Channel and Mediterranean Sea during her service as a blockade ship and cruiser. Triton also played a prominent role in several small-scale battles, including the action of 16 October 1799 where she assisted in the capture of two powerful Spanish frigates and earned her captain one of the largest sums of prize money of the war. Her unique design was ultimately flawed, limiting her sailing abilities, and Triton only served at sea for seven years before being converted into a hulk in 1803. She served as a receiving ship and guard ship before being either sold at Plymouth in 1814 or broken up in Newfoundland in 1820.

== Construction ==
Triton was a 32-gun, 12-pounder frigate. She was a 'one-off' ship, built to the designs of the First Naval Lord James Gambier. (Note: Gambier served at the Admiralty for 6 years, with one of his main personal contributions being in the field of ship design. The painting of Triton by Nicholas Pocock was completed for Gambier to immortalise his creation.) She was unusually constructed of fir instead of oak due to financial and operational necessity. (Note: Triton was part of the first of three phases of fir-built ships during the French Wars, with her phase of seven ships being the longest serving of the three, however she herself was the shortest lived.) As per her nature as a 'one-off' experimental ship, she had a number of unique features, being described as 'the most singular frigate design of the period'. She was wall-sided instead of incorporating a tumblehome, had almost no sheer, and had a sharply overhanging bow. These uniquely squared off elements of the ship came about because of the difficulties the Royal Navy had in obtaining naturally curved pieces of wood and as an experiment for improving sailing qualities. Triton was also fitted with 'air pipes' which ran to the lower deck to assist in ventilating the usually stuffy area. Triton was ordered on 7 April 1796 and completed with the following dimensions: 142 feet (43.3 m) along the gun deck, 123 feet 0 1/8 inch (37.5 m) at the keel, with a beam of 36 ft 2 in (11 m) and a depth in the hold of 11 feet 10 1/2 inches (3.6 m). She measured 85580/94 tons burthen.

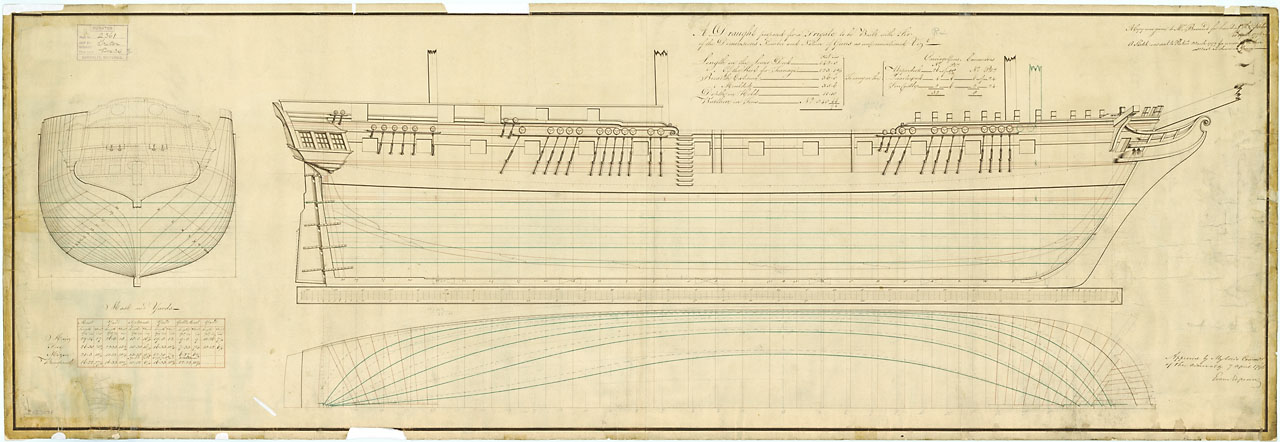
The 1796 lines of Triton, demonstrating her steep walls and flat deck

Triton was launched on 5 September 1796 and fitted out between 6 September and 31 October at Deptford. She had originally been intended to hold 18-pound guns rather than the 12-pounders she actually had; this was changed because of fears that the power of the larger guns would have been too much for the ship to withstand when firing. (Note: This was a common fear in ships made from alternative woods. In a similar fashion, the Maidstone-class frigates of 1795-6 were constructed with pitch pine and also downgraded from 18-pounders to 12-pounders.) While 32-gun 12-pounder frigates had been the standard of the Royal Navy for years prior, the advent of larger French 38-gun frigates meant that by the time of Triton's construction her armament was a rarity, and she was the only such example built until 1804. Worries over Triton would continue, with later proposals looking to downgrade her further to 9-pounders. (Note: When compared to frigates such as HMS Unicorn, which had the same number of guns and was built only two years earlier but was able to carry 18-pounders and larger carronades, the structural and firepower-related weaknesses of Triton are clear.) The experimental vertical sides and the very limited sheer meant that Triton was not a weatherly ship, while her peculiar bow caused her to slam heavily into waves. She required a very large amount of ballast, as she was also the shallowest frigate of the period, which made the ship roll greatly. Furthermore, her steering issues would have been exacerbated by her being designed to float on an even keel, rather than with more weight to the stern as was traditional.

In March 1797 Triton was slightly adapted; her fore mast was moved forward by 4 feet 6 inches (1.4 m) and her rudder was narrowed, greatly improving the responsiveness of the ship. Gambier was keen to learn about his personal design, and had the ship's first captain, John Gore, report the qualities of Triton to him. While Gore noted the difficulties with rolling and the bow he was pleased with the speed of the ship, saying that ‘we have fore-reached on everything we have met with’. The ship's surgeon was also pleased with the new 'air pipes', reporting that they had a positive effect on the health of the crew and rid the ship of the ‘thick noxious foul air’ that could usually be found on lower decks. Despite these benefits provided by Gambier's design, the timbers of the ship were put under considerable wear by Triton's abnormal sailing qualities, directly impacting her length of active service. (Note: Many of the experimental features of Triton were later perfected and used to design frigates such as HMS Ethalion.)

== Service ==
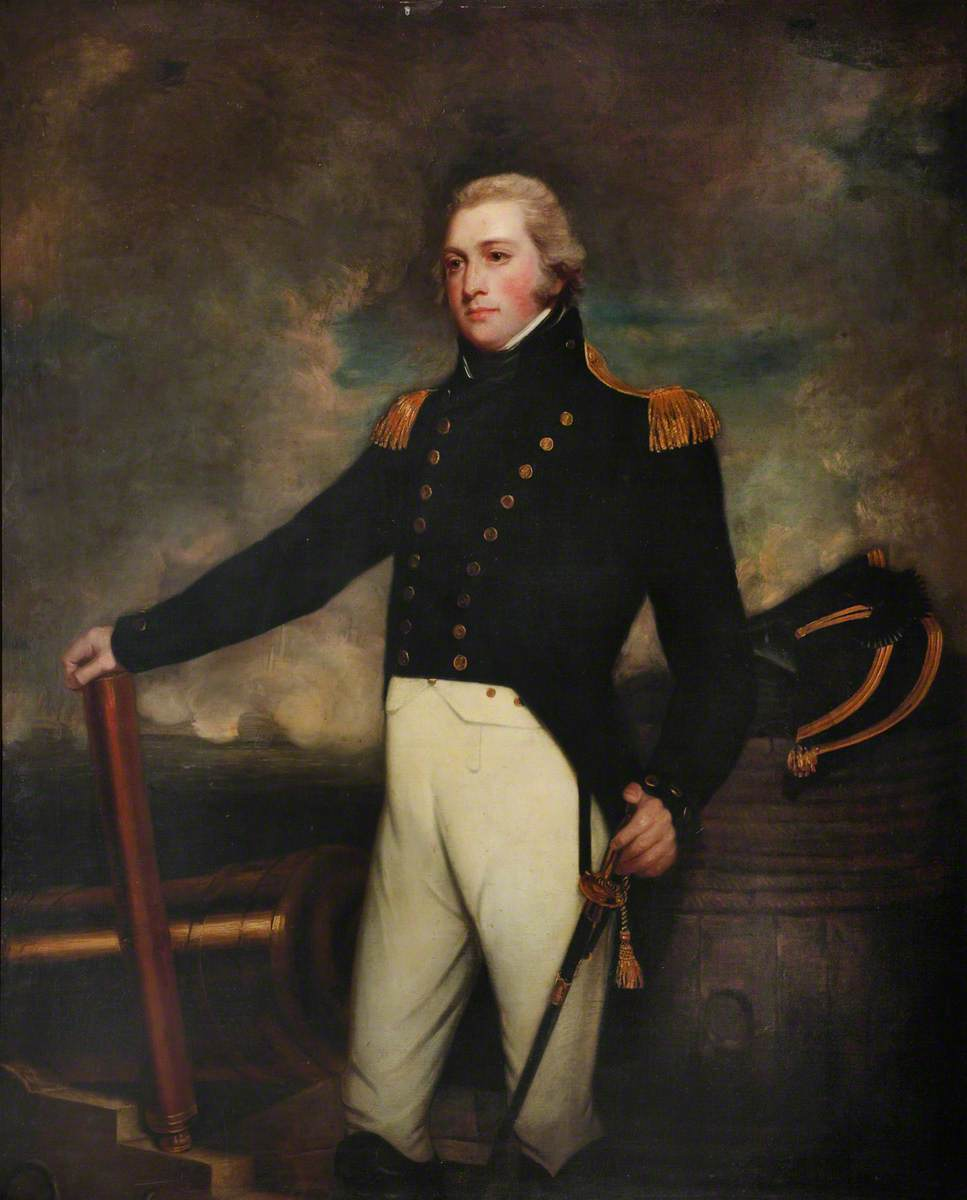
Captain John Gore, long time commander of Triton

Triton was commissioned in September 1796 by Captain John Gore, who would command her almost unbrokenly until 1801. Gore had recently returned from French captivity after he had been forced to surrender his command of the newly captured Le Censeur in 1795. From the launching of Triton until March 1797, the brother of Jane Austen and future Admiral of the Fleet Francis Austen served on board as a lieutenant.

=== Sir John Warren's squadron ===
Triton began active service in early 1797 by joining the blockading squadron of Sir John Warren in the English Channel. On 10 February she captured the French 14-gun privateer cutter Recovery, which was recently out of Le Havre and with a crew of forty-six had already taken a British smuggler and the American trader Atlantic which was retaken the same day. On 11 February she took the 10-gun privateer brig Jeune Emilie, which was forty days out of Saint-Malo and had taken the sloop Friendship as well as the 10-gun letter of marque Battalion. (Note: Triton captured Jeune Emilie at 49°10′N 12°24′W.) Continuing her string of successes, Triton took the 18-gun privateer La Difficile only a day after this. (Note: For Difficile and Jeune Emilie, Triton was in company with the frigate HMS Phoenix and the gun boat HMS Scourge; when taking Recovery the ships were joined by the frigates HMS Unite and HMS Stag.)

==== Resistance and Constance ====
On 9 March 1797 the British frigates HMS St Fiorenzo and HMS Nymphe spotted two French ships while returning from a reconnoitre of Brest. These ships were the 40-gun frigate Résistance and 22-gun corvette Constance. The two ships were attempting to return to France after participating in the landing of French troops at Fishguard on 22 February. St Fiorenzo and Nymphe quickly engaged the ships, despite the French Brest fleet being just over the horizon, first attacking Résistance which soon surrendered, followed around ten minutes later by Constance. At the close of the action, which would see Résistance purchased into the navy as Fishguard, Triton hove into sight alongside the ship-of-the-line HMS Robust; it has been suggested that the arrival of Triton and Robust facilitated the quick capture of the two French ships, however they did not play any part in the action itself. (Note: William James describes Triton here as a 28-gun frigate rather than her usual 32-gun configuration. Gregory Fremont-Barnes also notes Triton as such during her service, suggesting there were some irregularities with her armament.) Triton was more successful in reaching action after this, capturing the trader La Zoes on 12 June while sailing with a number of Warren's ships, and Boston on 25 July, now with a different part of the squadron. (Note: The former group of ships were the ships-of-the-line HMS Impétueux, HMS Mars, HMS Marlborough, and the frigate HMS Phaeton. The latter group were the frigates HMS Pomone, HMS Anson, and HMS Artois, the brig-sloop HMS Sylph, and the cutter Dolly.)

==== Convoy attacks ====
On 11 August Triton was sailing under Warren, with the frigates HMS Pomone and HMS Jason, and the brig-sloop HMS Sylph, off the coast of La Vendée. There, the squadron encountered a French convoy of brigs and chasse-marées protected by the 20-gun corvette Réolaise and a number of gun-boats. Upon seeing the threat, the convoy ran towards the Les Sables-d'Olonne river. The mouth of the river was protected by a fort which the convoy hoped would deter the squadron; however, Commander John Chambers White of Sylph volunteered to go in and attack the anchored ships, and was followed by Pomone and Jason half an hour later. The bombardment from the three ships sank the gun-boat guarding the river and heavily damaged Réolaise; Triton meanwhile had been chasing other ships of the convoy away. (Note: While Warren claimed in his report that Réolaise was 'so damaged as to be unfit for Service', by August 1799 she was operational again.) The attack on the convoy heavily disrupted the supplying of the naval base at Brest. The next day, the four ships took the trader Admiralitat.

Triton continued as part of the same squadron, and on 27 August discovered another French convoy around the mouth of the river Gironde. The squadron chased the convoy overnight; Triton and Jason were the fastest of the British and were able to capture five of the ships, which were likely Trois Soeurs, Egalité, St. Peter, St. Ann, and Dauphin. The convoy was carrying ship timbers, rosin, and tar, intended to help fit out new French privateers.

=== Blockade and Channel work ===
After these convoy actions Triton continued to patrol the Channel as a part of Warren's squadron, which for a brief period of time from March 1798 was commanded by Commodore John Willett Payne. The independent nature of the squadron had by this time been curtailed by the arrival of Admiral Lord Bridport to command the Brest blockade, with Triton now involving herself more in close blockade work. On 14 October 1797 while in company with the brig-sloop HMS Childers, she took the 4-gun privateer Le Furet near Île de Batz which was twenty-three days out of Tréguier and had fifty-three men on board. (Note: Le Furet was larger than the description suggests, being pierced for fourteen guns but only carrying four.) Near the end of the year she also took the privateer La Helene.

==== Action of 30 June 1798 ====
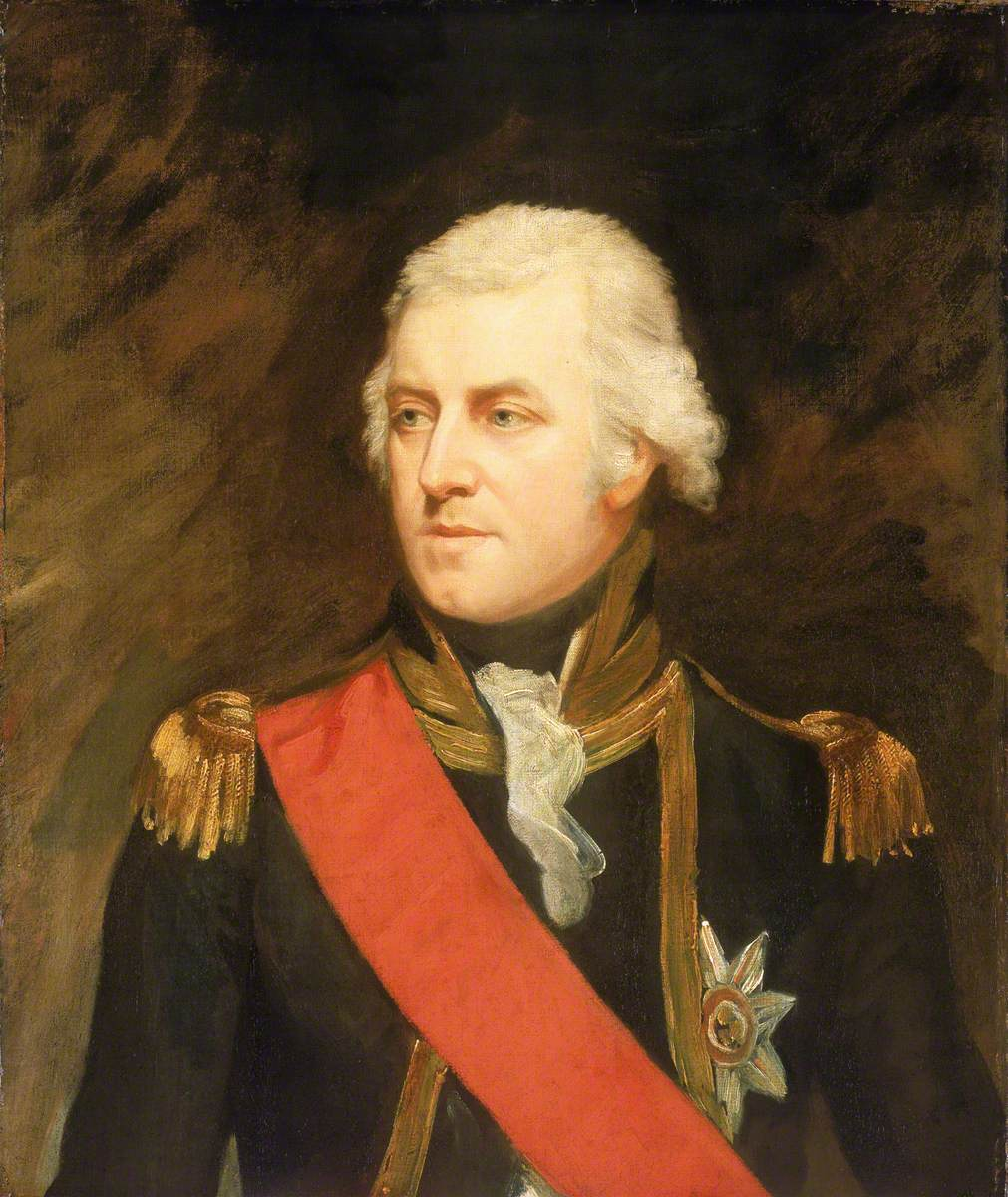
John Borlase Warren, of whose squadron Triton was frequently a part of

On 24 April 1798 the French 40-gun frigate Seine sailed from Port Louis, the capital of Mauritius, with 280 garrison troops onboard after being recalled from the Indian Ocean. At 7 a.m. on 29 June, Seine was sighted by Jason and the frigates HMS Pique, and HMS Mermaid off Brittany. At around 1:35 a.m. a long chase by the three frigates was concluded when Jason, Pique, and Seine all grounded on rocks off La Tranche-sur-Mer; dismasted, Seine surrendered as Mermaid approached. At this time Triton was serving in a small blockading squadron commanded by Captain Robert Stopford and consisting of Stopford's frigate HMS Phaeton alongside St Fiorenzo and Triton; all part of Warren's larger squadron. The squadron was called in by signal gun by Jason, as a force of French ships including two large frigates and a brig were leaving Rochelle with the intent of attacking the captors of Seine. The arrival of Stopford's squadron saved them from French attack, with William James arguing that without the intervention of Triton and the squadron, the situation 'would have been extremely critical'.

On 28 September Triton took the 5-gun schooner L'Arraigne as she attempted a passage from Bermeo to the Gulf of Saint Lawrence. Towards the end of 1798, Captain Gore was indisposed and temporarily replaced with Edward Griffith. Throughout this period Triton continued to serve alongside St Fiorenzo; on 11 and 12 December the ships captured the Spanish 4-gun privateer St. Joseph, the brand new French 14-gun brig La Rosée, and recaptured the trader George which had been captured while sailing to Lisbon with coal, copper, and bottles. On 31 December Triton had parted company with St Fiorenzo, and captured the 14-gun privateer brig L'Impromptu which had recently left Corunna.

==== Action of 18 June 1799 ====
From late January 1799, Gore returned to command Triton as part of the squadron of Vice-Admiral Sir Charles Thompson. On 29 January Gore forced a 16-gun cutter under the guns of the garrison of Guernsey, which then surrendered to the soldiers there. She took the 18-gun L'Aimable Victoire the next day after a chase of eight and a half hours. Victoire had sailed from Cherbourg on 28 January and had eighty-six men on board. By 13 March Triton was sailing with the frigates HMS Cambrian, HMS Naiad, and St Fiorenzo, together taking the merchant brig Victoire. A prize crew from Triton was assigned to take Victoire to Plymouth, but she foundered at her moorings off St Nicholas Island with her cargo of wine, brandy, and cordage still on board. In this period Triton also took the Spanish brig San Joachim with Cambrian.

On 25 April Triton was dispatched to Admiral Lord St Vincent in the Mediterranean Sea with news that the French fleet at Brest had escaped the blockade. This information was communicated to St Vincent's second in command, Vice-Admiral Lord Keith, whose fleet Triton then joined. In June Triton was still a part of this fleet of twenty-nine ships under Lord Keith. On 18 June the fleet encountered a squadron of French frigates under the command of Rear-Admiral Jean-Baptiste Perrée attempting to return to Toulon from Syria. A chase ensued and the frigates Courageuse, Alceste, and Junon, along with the brigs Salamine and Alerte were captured. It was deemed that Triton was one of the nine 'actual captors' of the French ships at the action. (Note: The other ships involved in the captures were the ships-of-the-line HMS Centaur, HMS Bellona, HMS Defiance, and HMS Captain alongside the frigates HMS Emerald and HMS Success, the sloop HMS Peterel, and the cutter HMS Santa Teresa.)

During this period Lord Keith had Triton and two other frigates search for the escaped French fleet from Toulon to Cádiz. The three ships discovered them in Cádiz, where the combined fleet amounted to thirty-eight ships of the line. The enemy fleet left Cádiz on 21 July, and after its frigates failed to chase Triton off her station Captain Gore ascertained that the fleet was sailing for Brest again. Triton overtook the enemy and arrived at Plymouth with the news of the fleet five days before it reached Brest. Triton was then sent to watch over the fleet in Brest with a squadron of frigates. While doing so, they deterred a Spanish squadron of five ships of the line and two frigates from entering the port through the Passage du Raz. Triton was then involved in the chase of the Spaniards, again in a squadron commanded by (now Rear-Admiral) Warren, who retreated to Ferrol and dismantled their ships.

==== Action of 16 October 1799 ====
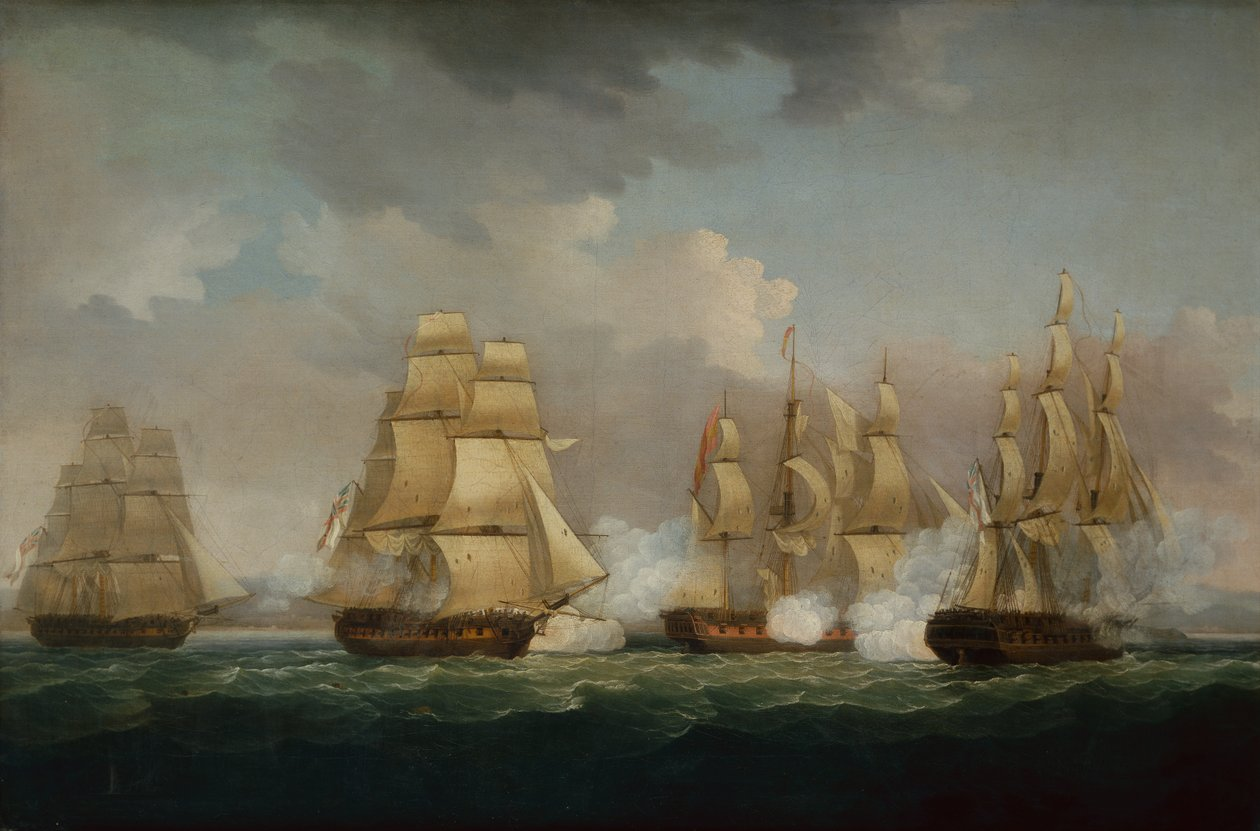
Painting of Triton engaging Santa Brigida alongside Naiad and Alcmene by Thomas Whitcombe

Warren ordered Triton to watch the Spanish ships inside Ferrol with the frigate HMS Ethalion. On 13 September she took the 6-gun lugger Le St Jacques after she was sighted while leaving L'Orient; St Jacques was carrying 662 13-inch shells to Rochefort.

On 15 October at 8 p.m. the Spanish 34-gun frigates Thetis and Santa Brigida were sighted by Naiad around Cape Finisterre. The two were travelling from the area of Vera-Cruz in New Spain with cargoes of treasure bound for any accessible Spanish port. Naiad began a chase of the Spaniards, and by the morning of 16 October had been joined by another frigate, HMS Alcmene; these two ships were then spotted by Triton and Ethalion who also joined the chase. At 7 a.m. Thetis and Santa Brigida split up to make their capture more difficult; the senior British officer Captain William Pierrepoint of Naiad ordered the leading ship, Ethalion, to ignore the closer Santa Brigida and instead chase Thetis. By 11:30 a.m. Ethalion was so close to Thetis that she was forced to engage and after a running fight of one hour, in which no Britons and only one Frenchman were killed, Thetis surrendered to Ethalion.

While Ethalion chased Thetis, Santa Brigida took a more southerly route of escape and by 17 October had managed to round Cape Finisterre. (Note: James notes that there are some discrepancies over the dating of events relating to the actions, but those stated are the consensus.) In order to do so she had run incredibly close to the rocks of the coast. Triton was the closest of the three British ships in pursuit, and took a similar course to Santa Brigida, however at 5 a.m. she grounded while going at a rate of seven knots, causing damage to her hull. By 7 a.m. Gore had managed to get Triton off of the rocks, and she began to fire at Santa Brigida. Alcmene in the meanwhile had sailed to cut Santa Brigida off from the coast, and the two British frigates began to attack her from either side. Santa Brigida attempted to escape, throwing her boats and anchors overboard to save weight and making elaborate manoeuvres among the rocks of Commarurto, but by 8 a.m. Naiad had engaged as well, and Santa Brigida surrendered off the entrance to Muros. Similarly to Ethalion's fight, the casualties involved were very limited. Triton was severely damaged with much water coming in from her grounding, but only had one man wounded during the action. Naiad did not close enough to receive casualties, while Alcmene had one seaman killed and nine wounded, and Santa Brigida two killed and eight wounded.

The action took place within sight of the Spanish squadron at Vigo. Upon seeing Santa Brigida captured, five of the squadron left port in an attempt to recapture her. Santa Brigida was taken in tow by Triton with Naiad ahead and Alcmene behind her. The ships prepared to fight off the Spanish squadron, but upon seeing their intent to defend their prize, the Spanish returned to Vigo. Around this time, Triton recaptured the American ship Abigail while in company with the same three frigates and detained another American, Polly.

On 21 October Thetis arrived at Plymouth, with Santa Brigida following one day later. While the ships were not bought into the Royal Navy, their true value was in their cargo. The treasure on board the two frigates exceeded £600,000 and included around 877 boxes of Spanish dollars, two bales of indigo, twenty-six of cochineal, twenty-three of cocoa, and sixteen of sugar. Sixty-three wagons were required to hold the large amount of treasure when it was transported to London. When proportioned for the crews this meant that Captain Gore alone received £40,730, which was an incredible amount. (Note: Exact prize money figures were: Captains £40,730 18s, Lieutenants £5,091 7s 3d, Warrant officers £2,468 10s 9d, Midshipmen 'etc' £791 17s, Seamen and Marines £182 4s 9d. Gore's share is the equivalent to approximately £1,800,000 in the modern day.)

==== Incident off Brittany ====
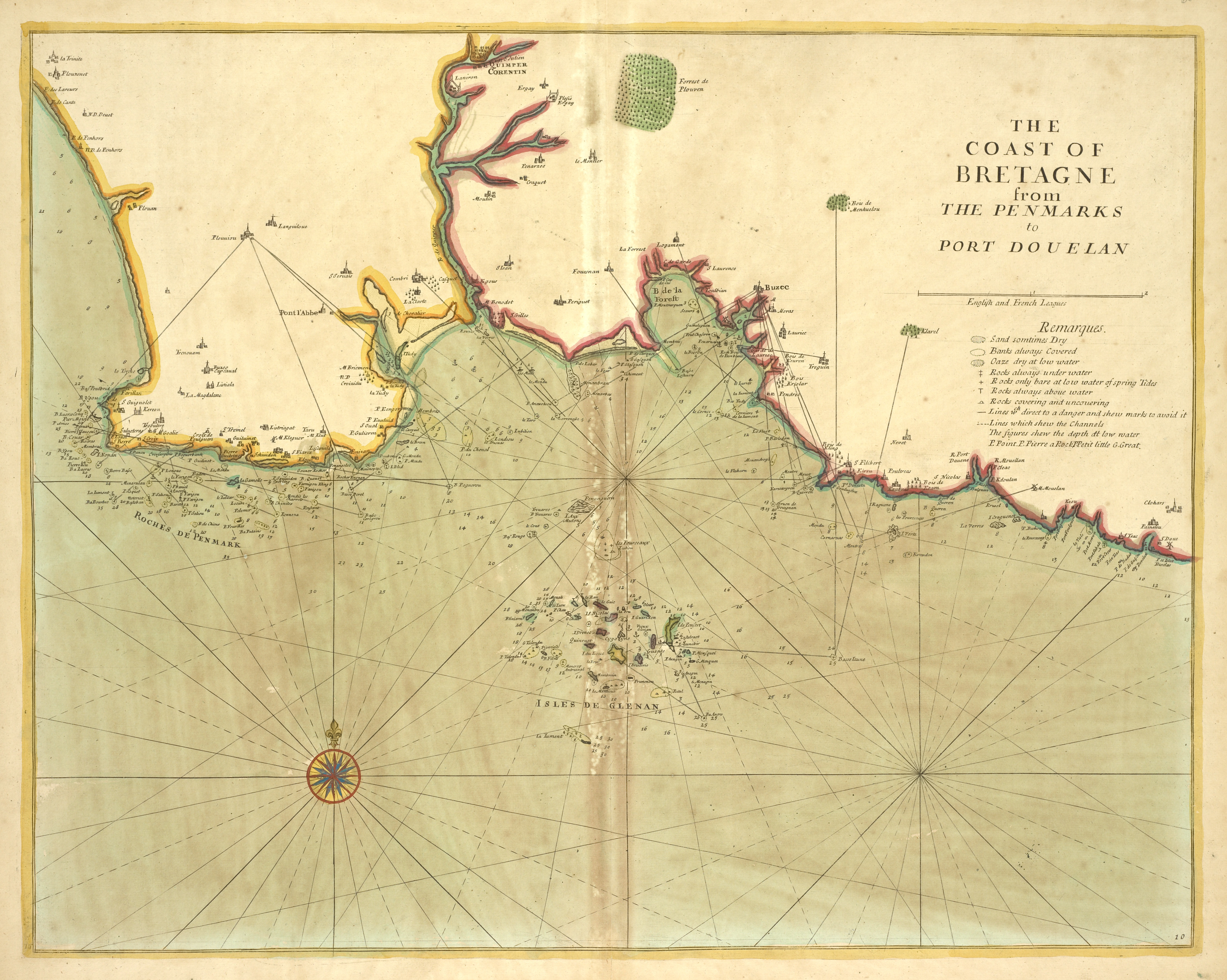
Map showing the coastal area patrolled by Triton at the time of the incident

Triton was docked and repaired and then sent to join the Channel Fleet off Brest once more. On 11 February 1800 she took the 14-gun brig La Vidette, which had previously been the British privateer Thought, as she travelled from Brest to L'Orient.

Around 12 March, Triton was chasing a cutter off the Penmarks when one of her 12-pounder guns burst upon firing. The explosion created a number of large splinters which killed the ship's second lieutenant, Lieutenant Alford, and a gunner's mate. Alford had been dining with Captain Gore, and was opening the door to leave the captain's cabin when the explosion blew his head off. Eighteen other members of Triton's crew were wounded in the accident, and a large section of the deck was ripped up as well as the captain's cabin being damaged. The wounded were taken to the Royal Naval Hospital; Alford and the gunner's mate were buried there on 13 March.

By 15 March Triton was cruising with the gun boat HMS Fowey and the cutter Joseph. Fowey was damaged in a gale and left the station off Brittany, leaving Triton and Joseph to attempt to burn the remains of the ship-of-the-line HMS Repulse which had been lost on rocks off the coast on 10 March. (Note: Michael Phillips has Fowey participating in the attempted destruction of Repulse and only leaving the station on 30 March.) The ships failed in doing so, as the French brought a battery of guns to bear on them from above the wreck of Repulse. On 15 April the trader San Sebastian arrived at Plymouth having been taken by Triton and fellow frigate HMS Stag while attempting a voyage from Santander. By July Triton was the lead frigate of the inshore squadron, reporting the movements of the combined fleet in Brest to Lord St Vincent.

=== Later service ===
In the spring of 1801 Captain Gore was replaced in Triton by Captain Robert Lewis Fitzgerald after reporting himself too fatigued from the heavy service of Triton to go back to sea. (Note: In July 1800 Gore had been hit in the head by a block and despite his protests, clearly incapacitated for a while. He later reported himself fit for service and was appointed to the frigate HMS Medusa on 1 May 1801.) She continued to serve in the Channel, taking the French letter of marque Le Jeune Theodore on 15 September 1801. Triton was not deemed a success on this commission and was paid off in April 1802.

From July 1803 to 1809 Triton was commanded by Commander William Cashman; she was fitted as a receiving ship at Woolwich in September 1803, likely because of the wear on the ship caused by her experimental design. By this time the ship's armament had been decreased to twelve nine-pounders and ten twenty four-pound carronades only. In 1807 Triton was the guard ship at Waterford; at the beginning of the Anglo-Russian War on 2 September she successfully detained the ships Norway Lion and Karen Helena. Her final service was as receiving ship at Plymouth from August 1810.

== Fate ==
Triton was either sold at Plymouth for £1,870 on 3 November 1814 or hulked in 1817 and broken up in Newfoundland in 1820.

== Prizes ==
Vessels captured or destroyed for which Triton's crew received full or partial credit
Date	Ship	Nationality	Type	Fate	Ref.
10 February 1797	Recovery	French	14-gun privateer cutter	Captured	
10 February 1797	Atlantic	American	Merchant vessel	Recaptured	
11 February 1797	Jeune Emilie	French	10-gun privateer brig	Captured	
12 February 1797	La Difficile	French	18-gun privateer	Captured	
12 June 1797	La Zoes	French	Merchant vessel	Captured	
25 July 1797	Boston	Not recorded	Not recorded	Captured	
11 August 1797	Not recorded	French	Gun boat	Destroyed	
12 August 1797	Admiralitat	Dutch	Merchant vessel	Captured	
4–29 August 1797	Trois Soeurs	French	Not recorded	Captured	
4–29 August 1797	Egalité	French	Not recorded	Captured	
4–29 August 1797	St. Peter	French	Not recorded	Captured	
4–29 August 1797	St. Ann	French	Not recorded	Captured	
4–29 August 1797	Furet	French	Not recorded	Captured	
4–29 August 1797	Dauphin	French	Not recorded	Captured	
28 August 1797	Le Petit Diable	French	18-gun cutter	Destroyed	
14 October 1797	Le Furet	French	4-gun privateer	Captured	
December 1797	La Helene	French	Privateer	Captured	
28 September 1798	L'Arraigne	French	5-gun schooner	Captured	
11–12 December 1798	St. Joseph	Spanish	4-gun privateer	Captured	
11–12 December 1798	La Rosée	French	14-gun privateer brig	Captured	
11–12 December 1798	George	British	Merchant vessel	Recaptured	
31 December 1798	L'Impromptu	French	14-gun privateer brig	Captured	
December 1798	Succés	French	Privateer	Captured	
29 January 1799	Not recorded	Not recorded	16-gun cutter	Captured	
30 January 1799	L'Aimable Victoire	French	18-gun ship	Captured	
13 March 1799	Victoire	French	Merchant brig	Captured	
March 1799	San Joachim	Spanish	Merchant brig	Captured	
18 June 1799	Courageuse	French	32-gun frigate	Captured	
18 June 1799	Alceste	French	32-gun frigate	Captured	
18 June 1799	Junon	French	40-gun frigate	Captured	
18 June 1799	Salamine	French	18-gun brig	Captured	
18 June 1799	Alerte	French	14-gun brig	Captured	
13 September 1799	Le St Jacques	French	6-gun lugger	Captured	
16 October 1799	Santa Brigida	Spanish	34-gun frigate	Captured	
October 1799	Abigail	American	Merchant vessel	Recaptured	
October 1799	Polly	American	Not recorded	Detained	
11 February 1800	La Vidette	French	14-gun brig	Captured	
April 1800	San Sebastian	Spanish	Merchant vessel	Captured	
15 September 1801	Le Jeune Theodore	French	Letter of marque	Captured	
2 September 1807	Norway Lion	Danish	Merchant vessel	Detained	
2 September 1807	Karen Helena	Danish	Merchant vessel	Detained	
