= Pierre Alexandre Pastour de Costebelle =

French naval officer (1750–1791)

Pierre Alexandre Pastour de Costebelle (Nyons, 20 February 1750 – Bellone, off Paris, 1791) was a French Navy officer.

== Biography ==
In November 1782, Costebelle was at Ceylon, in command of Naïade, a 20-gun corvette.

He took part in the Battle of Cuddalore on 20 June 1783, commanding the 40-gun frigate Consolante.

== Sources and references ==
Notes

Bibliography

- Cunat, Charles (1852). Histoire du Bailli de Suffren. Rennes: A. Marteville et Lefas. pp. 447.
- Roche, Jean-Michel (2005). Dictionnaire des bâtiments de la flotte de guerre française de Colbert à nos jours. Vol. 1. Group Retozel-Maury Millau. ISBN 978-2-9525917-0-6. OCLC 165892922.

External links

- "Pierre Alexandre PASTOUR de COSTEBELLE". Parcours de vie dans la Royale.
