= HMS Scourge (1803) =

Sloop of the Royal Navy

History

Great Britain
- Name: Herald
- Owner: Robert Waite, and J. Barry
- Builder: J. Barry, Whitby
- Launched: 1799, or 1800
- Fate: Sold to the Admiralty 1803

United Kingdom
- Name: HMS Scourge
- Acquired: June 1803 by purchase
- Fate: Sold 1816

United Kingdom
- Name: Herald
- Owner: Ward & Co.
- Acquired: 1816 by purchase
- Fate: Lost 1835

General characteristics
- Type: Sloop
- Tons burthen: Originally:338, or 339, or 340 (bm); After lengthening in 1823: 357 (bm)
- Length: 107 ft 0 in (32.6 m) (overall); 84 ft 3 in (25.7 m) (keel)
- Beam: 27 ft 6 in (8.4 m)
- Depth of hold: 12 ft 9 in (3.9 m)
- Sail plan: Sloop
- Complement: 100
- Armament: Herald:6 × 4-pounder guns; HMS:14 × 32-pounder carronades + 2 × 6-pounder bow chasers

HMS Scourge was the former merchant sloop Herald, launched in 1799, that the Admiralty purchased in 1803 for service as a convoy escort. The Admiralty had her laid up in 1805, and sold in 1816. Subsequent owners returned her to mercantile service and she sailed until 1835 when she was lost.

== Merchantman ==
Herald entered the 1800 volume of the Register of Shipping with R. White, master, J. Berry, owner, and trade Newcastle—St Petersburg. In the 1803 volume of Lloyd's Register her master is R. Waite, her owner "Capt. & Co.", and her trade Hull—Baltic.

== HMS ==
With the outbreak of the Napoleonic Wars, the Admiralty faced a sudden need for vessels to escort convoys in Home waters and protect them from French privateers. As stop-gap measure the Admiralty therefore purchased 20 ship-rigged vessels and armed them.

The Admiralty appointed Commander William Wooldridge, late of the hired armed brig Sir Thomas Pasley, to command Scourge. She was fitting in Deptford between July and September. In August he commissioned her for North Sea.

On 10 January 1804, pursuant to orders from Admiral Edward Thornbrough, Wooldridge took Scourge off Vlie, where he encountered a Prussian coming out of Amsterdam. The Prussian advised Wooldridge that there was a large vessel flying a flag designating her as a prize in the Vlie Roads awaiting for wind to enable her to sail up the passage. The Prussian further reported that the pilots had said that the vessel was an English ship carrying a cargo of timber. Wooldridge decided that it would be a worthwhile endeavour to deprive the enemy of the vessel and her cargo so after dark he brought Scourge into the State Mille Passage, where he anchored her a musket shot's distance from the quarry. Wooldridge then sent in Scourge's boats. These succeeded in cutting out the ship without sustaining any casualties though their quarry was armed with eight guns and lay under the protection of shore batteries. The vessel turned out to be of 400 tons burthen (bm), and to have been carrying lumber from Hull to Memel when on 19 December the Dutch 18-gun privateer brig Union had captured her off Norway.

The vessel was the Stranger, Law, master. Wooldridge sent her into Yarmouth. Scourge underwent fitting at Deptford between March and the beginning of May.

Scourge spent May to September convoying vessels in the Channel. She then went into ordinary at Deptford in October, where she remained for the remainder of the Napoleonic Wars.

== Disposal ==
The Commissioners of His Majesty's Navy offered the "Scourge sloop, of 339 tons" for sale at Deptford on 18 April 1816. She sold that day for £800.

== Herald ==
New owners registered her in London in 1816, and resumed her original name. She is first listed in Lloyd's Register in 1818 with Foreman, master, Ward & Co., owner, and trade London—Île de France. The listing gives her launch year as 1800.

Her owners had Herald lengthened in 1823, which increased her burthen.

In 1827, Herald, of Shields, Sopwith, master, was on a voyage from Danzig to Portsmouth when she grounded at Yarmouth. She was gotten off.

| Year | Master | Owner | Trade |
|---|---|---|---|
| 1820 | Stranach | Ward & Co. | London—St Vincent |
| 1825 | A. Young | Ward & Co. | London—Halifax |
| 1830 | R. Sopwith | J.Ratcliffe | Bristol—Newcastle |
| 1835 | T. Simkin; Blackburn | Smiths | Newcastle—Quebec |
| 1836 | Blackburn | Smiths | Newcastle—Quebec |

The 1836 volume of Lloyd's List has the notation "LOST" besides Herald's name. It shows her as launched at Whitby in 1799, and with Newcastle as her port of registry.
