= Sir John Strachan, 5th Baronet =

John Strachan, 5th Baronet^{[a]}
- Died: 28 December 1777; Bath, England
- Relatives: Richard Strachan (Nephew)
- Military career
- Allegiance: United Kingdom of Great Britain and Ireland
- Branch: Royal Navy
- Service years: 1727–1777
- Rank: Captain
- Commands: HMS Fortune; HMS Experiment; HMS Sapphire; HMS Orford
- Conflicts: Seven Years' War; Battle of Quiberon Bay

Sir John Strachan (died 28 December 1777) was a baronet and chief of Clan Strachan. He served in the Royal Navy, rising to the rank of captain and commanding a number of warships. His nephew, Richard Strachan, would also go on to have a distinguished career in the navy.

== Early life ==
John Strachan was born the eldest son of Patrick Strachan, M.D., physician to the Greenwich Hospital, and his wife, the daughter of a Royal Navy captain. Little is known about his early life, but he appears to have entered the Navy in about 1727. It would be twenty years before he would be promoted to the rank of lieutenant, in January 1747.

== Seven Years War ==
In 1755, Strachan was appointed second lieutenant aboard the 98-gun HMS St George, which was then the flagship of Lord Hawke. The following year Strachan accompanied Hawke to Gibraltar aboard HMS Antelope, to relieve John Byng. On arriving he was appointed to command the 18-gun sloop HMS Fortune, and on 9 September 1756 was posted to HMS Experiment.

Serving on the Experiment he captured the 20-gun French privateer Télémaque off Alicante on 19 July 1757, in a lopsided engagement that saw 110 French sailors killed and 156 wounded, against a total of 41 British casualties. During the encounter Strachan came alongside and sent a boarding party onto the Télémaque under William Locker, who secured her surrender. Strachan took the prize into Gibraltar and along with Locker, was reassigned to the 32-gun HMS Sapphire. He returned to England aboard her and in 1759 was attached to the Grand Fleet under Sir Edward Hawke. He was then assigned to the light squadron in Quiberon Bay under Commodore Robert Duff, and was present at the Battle of Quiberon Bay on 20 November 1759.

Strachan remained in command of the Sapphire until 1762.

== Later life ==
In 1770 Strachan was appointed to command HMS Orford, one of the squadron which went with Rear-Admiral Robert Harland to the East Indies. Ill health forced him to return to England just two years later whereupon he retired from active service.

He had married Elizabeth, daughter of Robert Lovelace of Battersea, but the marriage produced no children. He died at Bath on 28 December 1777. After his death the baronetcy passed to his nephew, Richard John Strachan who also became a distinguished Navy officer.

== Notes ==
a. Some confusion over which baronet he was exists. The Oxford Dictionary of National Biography lists him as the 3rd, but both Debrett's and Burke's Peerage list him as the 5th.

Baronetage of Nova Scotia
Preceded by Francis Strachan	Baronet (of Thornton, Kincardine); 1777–1828	Succeeded by Richard John Strachan
