= Gibraltar (1786 ship) =

Whaling ship

History

Great Britain
- Launched: 1776, France
- Acquired: 1786
- Captured: February 1796
- Fate: Burnt after capture

General characteristics
- Tons burthen: 304, or 306, or 350 (bm)
- Armament: 6 × 6-pounder guns

Gibraltar was launched in 1776 in France, almost certainly under another name. Between 1787 and 1795, she was a whaler in the northern whale (Greenland) fishery. A French privateer captured her in February 1796 as she was on her way to the fishery, and burnt her. Her loss led the British government to increase the protection of the outward-bound whaling fleet.

== Career ==
Gibraltar first appeared in Lloyd's Register (LR) in 1786.

Year	Master	Owner	Trade	Source
1786	W.Wray	Sparks & Co.	Hull–Greenland	LR

In late 1786 William Sparks and four other partners founded William Sparks & Co. They contributed £3,000 to outfit Gibraltar. Sparks & Co. outfitted Gibraltar at a cost of about £2800. Half the cost of outfitting a whaler went to doubling and fortifying the hull, specialist cordage, and the provision of blubber casks.

In the 1786 whaling season Wray was master of Young Maria. She returned from Greenland with seven whales, 15 seals, and one bear.

The whaling season lasted from March to July–August, or so. Favourable conditions could result in short seasons. When not whaling, the vessels would occasionally engage in the coal or Baltic trades, though with a crew a third of the size of that they required for whaling. (Note: The average size of a whaling crew was 44 men. Crews ranged in size from 30 to 45. They would include a master, mate, cook, surgeon, and one or two carpenters. The 1771 Bounty Act specified that all vessels of 200 tons had also to carry four boats with six men per boat. For every 50 tons above 200, the whaler was required to carry another boat and six-man crew.)

The data in the table below is from Coltish, augmented with reports in the press.

Year	Master	Where	Whales	Tuns blubber	Seals
1787	Wray	Greenland	3	63	1500

The 1786 voyage was a success Sparks & Co. So in March 1788 they contributed another £1,750, plus £1,000 to outfit another vessel, the Enterprise. (Note: That investment was not a success. The partners in 1793 ended up selling Enterprise at a loss.)

Year	Master	Where	Whales	Tuns blubber	Seals
1788	Wm. Wray	Greenland	16	129	30

During the 1788 season there was one extraordinary day. Gibraltar, Molly, and Manchester were in sight of each other when they took 21 whales. Gibraltar took 11, Manchester took 10, and Molly took six. Manchester was the most successful Hull whaler that season, and Gibraltar was the second most. They both had taken 16 whales, but Manchester had taken 310 seals, and gathered 306 butts of oil. Molly was fifth.

Year	Master	Where	Whales	Tuns blubber	Seals
1789	Wray	Greenland	2	25	45
1790	Wray	Greenland	4	72	1100
1791				33	0
1792	Wray	Greenland	14	70	35

In the 1792 season Gibraltar was the third best Hull whaler, behind Scarthingwell and Manchester.

Year	Master	Where	Whales	Tuns blubber	Seals
1793	Wray	Greenland	4	35	
1794	Wray	Greenland		53	
1795		Greenland	11	255	
1796			0	0	0

By late June 1795, Gibraltar had returned to Hull from Greenland a little early as she was already a "full ship". She was the second most successful Hull whaler. In November, Lloyd's List reported that Gibraltar, Wray, master, had returned to Hull from Archangel. (Note: One source incorrectly reported that Gibraltar had sailed for Archangel, was captured, and was never heard from again.)

Year	Master	Owner	Trade	Source & notes
1796	W.Wray	J.Burstall	Hull–Greenland	LR; damages repaired 1789, thorough repair 1793, & good repair 1795

== Loss ==
In February 1796, near Tinmouth, a French privateer captured Truro, Mackie, master, and Gibraltar. Truro was on her way from London to Leith, while Gibraltar was on her way to Greenland. The privateer burnt Gibraltar.

Gibraltar and Molly had sailed from Hull on 24 February, the first two vessels to sail for the fisheries for the season. With days Sir Samuel Standidge, the mayor of Hull, had received letters from Shields reporting that a French privateer was on the coast and that the privateer had already taken a ship and two sloops. It was feared that she had burnt Gibraltar as a large ship had been observed on 25 February to be on fire off the coast. Also, a boat had washed up on the beach, marked "Wray, Hull, No.5, 1796".

Captain Wray returned to Hull on 11 March and reported what had transpired. Gibraltar had been 6 or 7 miles off Shields when the French privateer brig Nayade, of 16 guns, Captain Leonard, had captured her. Leonard had removed Gibraltar's crew in her boats, and had set her on fire.

That evening Nayade had encountered HMS Star, one of two cutters that had been dispatched from the Firth of Forth to look for the privateer. (Note: There is no record of a Royal Navy cutter or hired armed vessel by that name based in the North Sea. There is even no record of a revenue cutter by that name in 1797.) The engagement, which lasted all night, cost Star one man killed and several men wounded. Nayade broke off the engagement in the morning and sailed to France. Captain Wray and his men were imprisoned at Dunkirk for four days before they were exchanged.

The loss of Gibraltar led the government in 1796 to assign the armed lugger Black Joke, under the command of Lieutenant Boarder, to sail to protect the Hull whaling fleet sailing to Lerwick.
