= HMS Barracouta (1782) =

Cutter of the Royal Navy

History

Great Britain
- Name: HMS Barracouta
- Acquired: June 1782 by purchase
- Fate: Sold 1792

Great Britain
- Name: Thought
- Builder: Joshua Stewart, Sandgate
- Acquired: 1792 by purchase
- Captured: 3 September 1793

France
- Name: Pensée
- Acquired: September 1793 by capture
- Renamed: Montagne, then Pensée, then Vedette
- Captured: 10 January 1800

Great Britain
- Name: Vidette
- Acquired: 10 January 1800 by capture
- Fate: Sold 1802

General characteristics
- Tons burthen: 190, or 197, or 19714/94, or 20210/94 (bm)
- Length: Overall:75 ft 2 in (22.9 m), or 76 ft 11 3/4 in (23.5 m); Keel:54 ft 11 in (16.7 m)
- Beam: 25 ft 11 3/4 in (7.9 m), or 26 ft 0 in (7.9 m)
- Depth of hold: 10 ft 6 in (3.2 m), or 10 ft 7 1/2 in (3.2 m)
- Complement: Royal Navy:90 (60 peacetime); Privateer:100; French Navy:60–100
- Armament: Royal Navy: Initially:14 × 6-pounder guns + 12 × ½-pounder swivel guns; 1783:14 × 4-pounder guns + 12 × ½-pounder swivel guns; Privateer:16 × 6-pounder guns; French Navy:
- Notes: Clincher-built and coppered

The Royal Navy purchased HMS Barracouta on the stocks in 1782. After she had served for almost ten years patrolling against smugglers, the Navy sold her in 1792. She became the privateer Thought, which had a successful cruize, capturing several prizes including a French privateer, but then was herself captured in September 1793. She served the French Navy under the names Pensée, Montagne, Pensée, and Vedette, until the British recaptured her in 1800 and renamed her HMS Vidette. The Royal Navy sold her in 1802.

== Royal Navy service ==
The Royal Navy purchased Barracouta on the stocks. It named and registered her as a sloop on 15 June 1782. She was registered as a cutter on 13 March 1783, and Lieutenant Daniel Folliott commissioned her that month for the Western Channel.

Barracouta was paid off in August 1786, but recommissioned in September by Lieutenant Robert Barlow for Rame Head and the Cornish coast. He cruised with great success against smugglers until he was promoted to the rank of Commander in 1790, and soon after appointed to the brig Childers with orders to resume his former station on the coast of Cornwall.

In 1790 Barracouta was under the command of Lieutenant Alexander Douglas for the Yorkshire coast. She underwent fitting at Sheerness in 1790 and then in 1791 she was under the command of Lieutenant James Malcolm.

The "Principal Officers and Commissioners of his Majesty's Navy" offered "His Majesty's Cutter Barracouta, Burthen 197 Tons, lying at Sheerness" for sale on 12 January 1792. The Navy sold her at Sheerness for £260 on 19 January.

== Privateer ==
Barracouta became the privateer Thought in 1793. However, she did not appear in Lloyd's Register.

On 13 May Captain Sedgefield Dale acquired a letter of marque. Then on 31 May Captain Harding Shaw acquired a letter of marque.

On 19 July Lloyd's List (LL) reported that the privateer Thought, of London, had brought several vessels into Falmouth. One was the French privateer Passe Partout, of 16 guns and of Bordeaux. (Note: Passe Partout had been commissioned at Bordeaux in June 1793. She was armed with 16 guns and had a crew of 120 men.) Passe Partout had on board some dollars and chests of sugar that she had taken from a Spanish ship. There were two American vessels: Rawlinson which had been sailing from New York to Havre de grace with pork and flour, and Active, Blair, master, which had been sailing from Philadelphia to Nantes with sugar and coffee. Thought captured Active in company with the privateer Weymouth, of Weymouth. (Note: Captain John Sturmey had acquired a letter of marque for the lugger Weymouth, of 30 tons (bm), on 29 May 1793. She had a crew of 25 men and was armed with six 6-pounder guns and eight swivel guns.) Thought also recaptured Neptune, which had been sailing from West Indies to Liverpool.

On 3 September a French frigate captured Thought and took her into Lorient.

== French service ==
Thought became the French naval brig Pensée in January 1794. She was at Dunkirk in February. In January 1795 she was renamed Montagne. She became Pensée again in January 1796, and Vedette in July.

In July 1796, she escorted a convoy from Lorient to Audierne under Ensign Gravereau. On 2 February 1797 she was off Croisic, where she captured the British privateer Loterie.

HMS Triton captured Vedette on 10 February 1800. (Note: Roche gives the date of capture as 11 February. The discrepancy in dates is probably due to the Royal Navy counting the day from midday to midday, rather than midnight to midnight.) Triton was with a squadron off the Stevenet Rock when she captured Vedette, of 14 guns and 84 men, which was sailing from Brest to Lorient.

French records indicate that Vedette, lieutenant de vaisseau Kerdrain, was escorting a convoy from Lorient to Brest. The capture took place at the mouth of the Iroise Sea.

The prize arrived safely in Falmouth on the 19th. Captain John Gore's report described Vedette as a national (i.e., naval) brig and the former cutter Barracouta. Lloyd's List (LL) reported on 18 February that Videt, of 14 guns and 80 men, a prize to the frigate Triton, had arrived at Falmouth. She had arrived on 12 February. The news item noted that Videt was the former cutter Thought.

Vidette was offered for sale at Plymouth on 9 April 1800, at Plymouth.

== Royal Navy service ==
By one account, the Royal Navy took her in as Vidette, but did not commission her.

Admiralty records indicate that Vidette served as a hired vessel between 1800 and 1801, suggesting that private parties had bought her in 1800. She was sold in 1802.
