= Hired armed cutter Black Joke =

History

Great Britain
- Name: Black Joke
- Namesake: Black Joke - a bawdy song
- Commissioned: 12 January 1795
- Decommissioned: 19 October 1801
- Renamed: Suworow, 1799
- Fate: Returned to owner, 1801

General characteristics
- Type: Cutter
- Tons burthen: 9886/94 (bm)
- Armament: 10 × 6-pounder guns

The hired armed cutter Black Joke was a cutter that served the Royal Navy from 12 January 1795 to 19 October 1801. In 1799 she was renamed Suworow, and under that name she captured numerous prizes before she was paid off after the Treaty of Amiens.

== Service as Black Joke ==
In May 1795, the "lugger" Black Joke, under the command of Lieutenant Richard Clark, was part of Sir Sidney Smith's squadron in the Channel. On 24 February 1796, His Majesty's cutter Black Joke captured Poor Jack.

In 1796, the armed lugger Black Joke, under the command of Lieutenant Boarder, protected the Hull whaling fleet sailing to Lerwick. This was a response to a French privateer capturing the whaler Gibraltar as she was on her way to Greenland.

By some accounts, in 1797 Black Joke alerted the Fleet to the Dutch entry into the North Sea before the Battle of Camperdown. The majority of accounts attribute the warning to the hired cutter Active. Also in 1797, the lugger Black Joke recaptured Ceres and Good Intent. Black Joke was in company with the hired armed vessel Liberty and the Excise cutter Lively at the time of the recapture of Ceres, and Liberty at the time of the recapture of Good Intent.

On 10 March 1798 His Majesty's hired armed lugger Black Joke was briefly under the command of Lieutenant Mauritius Adolphus Newton de Stark when she captured the fishing vessel Saint Petre. On 26 May Black Joke and the sloop Hound captured the brig Minerva.

On 27 April 1799, while under the command of Lieutenant James Nicolson (or Nichelson), Black Joke captured the French chasse-marée Rebecca, of four swivel guns and seven men, just out of Brest having on board a capitaine de frégate with dispatches for Ireland. The dispatches were a ruse that drew British attention to the Irish coast, when the Brest fleet had sailed to reinforce French forces in Corfu, Malta, and Egypt (see: Bruix' expedition of 1799).

Then on 10 July Black Joke captured Flora. Flora, of Dublin, had been sailing with a cargo of wine, fruit, and cotton, when the French privateer Vengeance, of 20 guns and 130 men, had captured her. Black Joke sent Flora into Torbay.

== Service as Suworow ==
By 2 November 1799 she was sailing under the name Suworow. (Note: Alternatively Suwarrow, Soworrow or Zuwarrow, presumably after Alexander Suvorov, who won a series of victories against the French during 1799.) Under Lieutenant James Nicholson she carried despatches to and from Lord Bridport, commander of the Channel Fleet, off Brest, and captured numerous prizes. On 27 November the French privateer rowboat Revanche arrived at Portsmouth, sent in by the schooner Suwarrow.

On 1 and 14 March, and 19 April and 10 June 1800, she captured the ketch Jean Bart, the chasse marees Bon Citojan and Morbihan, and the ketch Clair Voyante. To capture the chase marees, Nicholson had had to drive off three French luggers, one of 10 guns and two of eight, in the Passage du Raz. Actually, Nicholson captured three chase marees, one in ballast and two carrying wine, and he sent all three into Falmouth or Plymouth.

On 5 March Suworow shared in the capture, with Agamemnon and Repulse, of the brig Sophie. On 5 April Suworow chased a French privateer of 16 guns for several hours but lost her in the night. Then on 12 May, together with the frigates Clyde and Thames, she captured another chasse maree.

Also during May Nicholson reconnoitered Belle Île. He took an officer from Impetueux into Rochefort where they counted five sail-of-the-line and three frigates ready for sea. When Nicholson returned to Belle Île in August he found that the French had fortified every point of land or creek that he had found unfortified in May.

On 12 September 1800 Nicholson cut out the French brig Providence from under two batteries near Camaret Point. She was carrying wine, soap and brandy for the Brest fleet; the capture took place under heavy fire but Suworow suffered no casualties. Although the third rate Elephant and the frigate Naiad were in sight, they voluntarily relinquished their share of the prize money to Nicholson and his crew "in testimony of their approbation of their conduct."

On 23 November 1800 Captain Sir Richard Strachan in Captain chased a French convoy in to the Morbihan. There shore batteries and the 20-gun corvette Réolaise were able to provide protection. Magicienne harried the corvette until she ran onshore at Port Navale; her crew got her off again later. Suworow then towed in four boats with Lieutenant Hennah of Captain and a cutting-out party. The hired armed cutters Nile and Lurcher towed in four more boats from Magicienne. Although the cutting-out party was exposed to heavy fire cannon and small arms fire, it reached the corvette. The party set fire to the corvette before withdrawing; shortly thereafter the corvette blew up. The boats also brought out two merchant vessels that their captors later burnt. Only one British seaman, a crewman from Suworow, was killed in the attack; seven seamen were wounded. However, Suworow's sails and rigging were so badly cut up that Captain had to tow her.

Suworow sailed on 21 December 1800 to cruise off the Penmarks as part of Sir Edward Pellew's squadron. On 3 February 1801 she captured the French brig Jeune Annette (or Jeune Nannette). Jeune Annette, under Lieutenant de vaisseaux Feuqueux, was armed with 18 guns and had a crew of 45 men. She had been sailing from Cayenne to Bordeaux with a cargo of "anatto, dye wood, elephants teeth, etc." and a number of deported priests, who were emaciated after their confinement. Because Suworow had previously sent in four Danish vessels, Suwarrow had only 16 men and boys on board when she chased and captured Jeune Annette. Jeune Annette became the hired armed brig (or cutter) Sir Thomas Pasley.

On 23 June, while Suworow was off Santander with dispatches from Admiral William Cornwallis when she encountered a Spanish 44-gun frigate and a gun-brig. The Spaniards chased her for 14 hours and were gaining on her so Nicholson had to throw all his guns overboard to gain speed. He succeeded in escaping only when darkness arrived. Suworow then came into Plymouth for a refit.

In early October Suworow sailed into Brest under a flag of truce, bringing with her a senior officer. Nicholson ended up having dinner with Admiral Villaret, the commander of the French fleet, and the Spanish Admiral, Don Gravina. Madame Villaret presented Lieutenant Nicholson with a Morocco purse, having a bust of Bonaparte under glass, set in silver. Admiral Villaret sent a basket of fruit to Admiral Cornwallis as well.

== Fate ==
After the signing of the Treaty of Amiens brought peace with France, the Admiralty terminated Suworow's contract on 28 October, as it did the contracts of the other hired vessels. The hired vessels turned in their guns and stores prior to being paid off. Prize money from Jean Bart, Bon Citojan, Morbiham, Clair Voyante, and Jeune Annette was paid on 22 March 1802.

One report has Black Joke (under that name and not Suworow) being accidentally burnt in Sutton Pool, Plymouth, on 28 January 1802. She was discovered to be on fire amongst a tier of ships and after she had burned with great fury she was scuttled. She sank without doing any harm.

However, another report suggests that she may have reverted to her old name and served as the hired armed lugger Black Joke from 1808 until her capture by the French in 1810.
