= Battalion (comics) =

Battalion, in comics, may refer to:

- Battalion (DC Comics), a.k.a. Alexander Lyons, a member of Team Titans, an alternative universe version of the Teen Titans
- V-Battalion, a fictional organisation in the Marvel Universe

== See also ==
- Battalion (disambiguation)
