= French corvette Naïade (1780) =

History

France
- Name: Naïade
- Ordered: 23 July 1779
- Builder: Toulon
- Laid down: July 1779
- Launched: 21 December 1779
- Commissioned: April 1780
- Captured: 1805

United Kingdom
- Name: HMS Naiad
- Fate: Sold 1784

General characteristics
- Class & type: Coquette-class corvette
- Type: corvette
- Tons burthen: 400 tonnes
- Length: 38.7 metres
- Beam: 9.9 metres
- Draught: 4.9 metres
- Armament: 18 × 8-pounder long guns

Naïade was a 20-gun Coquette-class corvette. She took part in the Indian theatre of the Anglo-French War with the squadron under Suffren. The British Royal Navy captured her in 1783 but never commissioned her; it sold her in 1784.

== French service ==
On 11 February 1782, Naïade departed Brest. She called Isle de France (Mauritius) and arrived at Cuddalore on 10 March 1782 to support the squadron under Suffren.

In November 1782, she was at Ceylon under Costebelle.

On 11 April, Captaine de Brûlot Villaret de Joyeuse was given command of Naïade. Suffren sent her to Madras to warn the French blockading squadron, composed of the 74-gun Fendant, the 64-gun Saint-Michel and the frigates Cléopâtre and Coventry, of the imminent arrival of a superior British force. Three days after her departure, on 11 April 1783, Naïade spotted the 64-gun HMS Sceptre, under Captain Graves; after trying without success to elude his much stronger opponent, Villaret was forced into battle, and struck his colours after a five-hour fight. When Villaret surrendered his sword, Graves allegedly told him "Sir, you have given us a fairly beautiful frigate, but you made us pay dearly for her!"; some authors add that Graves returned Villaret his sword.

== British service ==
The British armed Naïade with twenty-two 12-pounder guns, and two 18-pounder and six 12-pounder carronade, but never commissioned her. From 26 April 1783, she was under Lieutenant Richard Strachan.

== Fate ==
Naïade was sold on 17 August 1784.
