= French ship Consolante =

At least three ships of the French navy were named Consolante:

- French frigate Consolante (1775), a Pourvoyeuse-class frigate
- French felucca Consolante (1794) in service 1794-1795
- French frigate Consolante (1800), lead ship of the Consolante-class frigate
