= HMS Requin (1795) =

Brig of the Royal Navy

History

France
- Name: Requin
- Namesake: Shark in French
- Builder: Boulogne-sur-Mer
- Launched: March 1794
- Captured: 20 February 1795

Great Britain
- Name: HMS Requin
- Acquired: 1795 by capture
- Fate: Wrecked 1 January 1801

General characteristics
- Displacement: 110 tons (unladen); 171 tons (laden)
- Tons burthen: 16529/94 (bm)
- Length: French; Overall: 22.25m; Keel:18.52m; British; Overall: 71 ft 2 in (21.7 m); Keel: 54 ft 11 1/2 in (16.8 m)
- Beam: French: 7.15m; British: 23 ft 9 1/2 in (7.3 m)
- Depth of hold: French: 3.3m; British: 10 ft 3 in (3.1 m)
- Complement: French Navy: Royal Navy:59
- Armament: French Navy: 12 × 6-pounder guns + 2 × 12-pounder obusiers; Royal Navy: 10 × 4-pounder guns

HMS Requin was the French Navy cutter Requin, launched at Boulogne in 1794. HMS Thalia captured Requin in 1795. Requin captured one small French privateer and participated in the capture of Suriname before wrecking in 1801.

== French Navy ==
Requin was the sole vessel of her class. She was built to plans by Daniel Denÿs dated 4 February 1793. She was originally a cutter, but was re-rigged as a brig in early 1795.

On 14 July 1794 she sailed from Brest under the command of enseigne de vaisseau Dominique Morel, and in a squadron commanded by Jean L'Hermite. The squadron sailed around the British Islands, entering the North Sea from the north. There the squadron destroyed many British and Dutch fishing boats. A gale caused Requin to separate from the French squadron and she sailed towards Dunkirk. On her way she encountered a British frigate. Morel sailed away, throwing his guns, anchors, and a spare mast overboard to lighten his brig, firing from his stern. Eventually the frigate caught up and after firing a broadside, which the frigate returned, Requin struck.

HMS Thalia captured Requin on 20 February 1795. As a prize she sold for about £1500. The capture took place in sight of the fleet and there was delay in paying out the prize money because of disagreement among the captains as to whether the entire amount should go to Thalia or whether it was to be distributed over the fleet.

== Career ==
Requin was commissioned in July 1795 under Lieutenant William Champain, for the Leeward Islands Station. Then in 1798 Lieutenant Kenneth M'Kenzie replace Champain, and was in August in Barbados in turn replaced by Lieutenant William Wood Senhouse.

In early 1798 Senhouse was in company with George. Senhouse instructed Lieutenant Michael Mackay to sail George to Martinique. On the way, George encountered two Spanish vessels of superior force and after a sanguinary engagement was forced to strike.

On 1 May 1798 of St Bartholomew Requin captured the French privateer sloop Mutine, of six guns and 44 men.

In August 1799 Requin was part of the force under Vice-Admiral Lord Hugh Seymour that captured Surinam. Admiral Seymour then sent Requin and Senhouse to England with the dispatches announcing the capitulation of Suriname. Senhouse arrived at the Admiralty on the afternoon of 12 October 1799.

Lieutenant Frederick Thesiger assumed command of Requin in December. Next year, Lieutenant Samuel Fowell replaced Thesiger.

The great gale of 8–9 November 1800 cost Requin her mainmast and caused so much damage to her that she had to go into harbour at Portsmouth to effect repairs.

== Fate ==
Requin was wrecked on a sunken rock in Quiberon Bay on 1 January 1801. She was forced onto a reef, got off, but was filling rapidly with water. Her crew fired distress guns and rockets, threw guns overboard, and cut away her foremast and booms. Fowell dispatched a boat with 20 men to the shore to get help, but the French took the men prisoner. Boats from HMS Excellent and Requin's own boats took off the rest of the crew.

The hired armed cutter Nile went in under a flag of truce to offer to exchange 20 French prisoners aboard her for the 20 men from Requin who had one ashore to get help. The French refused the exchange pending receiving authorization from the Premier Consul (Napoleon Bonaparte).
