= HMS George (1796) =

Sloop of the Royal Navy

History

Great Britain
- Name: George
- Acquired: 1796 by purchase of a prize
- Captured: 3 January 1798

General characteristics
- Tons burthen: 105 (bm)
- Sail plan: Sloop
- Complement: circa 40
- Armament: 6 × 4–pounder guns

HMS George was a sloop that the Royal Navy acquired in 1796, probably as the acquisition of a prize. She was captured by two Spanish privateers of superior force on 3 January, 1798 in a intense engagement.

== Capture ==
Lieutenant Michael Mackay sailed from Demerara on 2 January 1798 under orders from Lieutenant Stenhouse of HMS Requin to proceed to Martinique. The next day Mackay sighted two vessels, a schooner and a cutter. The two were flying British colours but Mackay was suspicious and prepared for action. As the cutter came within cannonshot of George the cutter hauled down her British colours and raised Spanish colours, opening fire as she did so.

The ensuing engagement lasted 40 minutes. The sloop held her own until her helmsman was killed and she lost the wind. George ran into the cutter, which grappled her. The schooner took a position off George's starboard quarter and raked her. George's crew repelled two boarding attempts, but on their third the Spaniards succeeded in taking possession.

British casualties, out of the 40 men on board, were eight killed (one a civilian passenger), and 17 wounded, one of the wounded being Mackay. He reported that the Spaniards had 32 men killed and several wounded. Mackay reported that the cutter carried 12 guns and 109 men, and the schooner 6 guns and 68 men.

The Spaniards took their captives to St Thomas of Oronoque, from whence the Spanish vessels had come. There the governor took good care of the wounded and the rest of the prisoners.
