= HMS Orford (1749) =

Ship of the line of the Royal Navy

- Orford

History

Great Britain
- Name: HMS Orford
- Ordered: 31 August 1745
- Builder: John Hollond (1746); Thomas Fellowes (1746–1749), Woolwich Dockyard
- Laid down: 24 February 1746
- Launched: 15 November 1749
- Commissioned: March 1755
- Fate: Sunk as a breakwater, Sheerness, 1783

General characteristics
- Class & type: 1745 Establishment 70-gun third rate ship of the line
- Tons burthen: 1,414 56/94 (bm)
- Length: 160 ft 2 in (48.8 m) (gundeck); 131 ft 4 in (40 m) (keel)
- Beam: 45 ft 0 in (13.7 m)
- Depth of hold: 19 ft 4 in (5.9 m)
- Sail plan: Full-rigged ship
- Complement: 520
- Armament: 70 guns: Gundeck: 26 × 32 pdrs; Upper gundeck: 28 × 18 pdrs; Quarterdeck: 12 × 9 pdrs; Forecastle: 4 × 9 pdrs

HMS Orford was a 70-gun third rate ship of the line of the Royal Navy, built to the draught specified by the 1745 Establishment at Woolwich Dockyard, and launched in 1749.

== Construction ==
Orford was a 70-gun third rate ship of the line of the 1745 Establishment. This Establishment was designed as an improvement on the 1741 Establishment, which had called for smaller 64-gun ships to be built, and accordingly added six guns to the standard ship of the line design.

Orford was ordered on 31 August 1745 to be built at Woolwich Dockyard by the shipwright John Hollond, but while Hollond began the project, construction was completed from June 1746 by Thomas Fellowes. She was laid down on 24 February 1746 and launched on 15 November 1749 with the following dimensions: 160 feet 2 inches (48.8 m) along the gun deck, 131 feet 4 inches (40 m) at the keel, with a beam of 45 feet (13.7 m) and a depth in the hold of 19 feet 4 inches (5.9 m). She measured 1,414 56/94 tons burthen. The fitting out process for Orford was completed on 12 December.

== Service ==
Orford was commissioned in March 1755 by Captain Lord Northesk to serve in the Western Squadron of Admiral Edward Hawke. By May illness had forced Northesk to resign his command and he was replaced in Orford by Captain Charles Steevens the same month. As part of Hawke's fleet she participated in the destruction of the en flûte French 74-gun ship of the line L'Esperance on 13 November before transferring to the fleet of Admiral Edward Boscawen in the summer of 1756 and then again to that of Admiral Charles Knowles in November of the same year. In 1757 Captain Richard Spry took over command of Orford from Steevens and she then sailed for North America on 16 April to continue her service in the Seven Years' War, in a fleet commanded by Boscawen. In the middle of 1758 the fleet participated in the successful Siege of Louisbourg, bombarding fortifications and protecting the landings of the army.

Orford sailed for England some time after the siege, thus missing the Battle of Quiberon Bay, but returned to North America on 16 February 1759 in time to participate in the Battle of Quebec on 13 September. Orford then sailed for the English Channel to join the Brest blockade fleet of Hawke in 1760; there she captured the French 8-gun privateer schooner La Marguerite on 4 April. For part of the year Orford was the lead ship of a small squadron of ships tasked with watching and recording the locations of French ships that had returned to France after escaping from Quiberon Bay. Orford was so successful in this task that Spry was granted an audience with King George III at St James's Palace on 16 March 1761. Captain Mariot Arbuthnot replaced Spry in command of Orford in either July or August and she continued off Brest, taking the French 14-gun L'Anemone and 4-gun La Sardoine alongside the ship of the line HMS Mars in the Bay of Biscay on 13 August. (Note: Orford is recorded as a 66-gun ship at this time in her service.)

On 25 February 1762 Orford sailed for the Leeward Islands where she took part in the successful Siege of Havana between 6 June and 13 August; here Orford's role was to serve as a signalling ship off the coast, controlling the landing of stores. Some time after this she returned to England. She was brought into dock for a survey between 15 May 1764 and 23 July 1765, the result of which was the ordering of a large series of repairs to her at Chatham Dockyard which were completed in August 1767 at the cost of £28,659, which was only £3,000 less than her original construction price. Orford was not immediately put back into service, only being recommissioned in November 1770 under the command of Captain Sir John Strachan to serve in the Falklands Crisis. (Note: John Charnock records Strachan assuming command in 1771.) After the Crisis ended Orford sailed to the East Indies on 25 March 1771 as part of Rear-Admiral Robert Harland's squadron. While there Strachan was replaced in command of Orford by Captain Charles Leslie in October 1772. Orford returned to England in 1775 where Leslie died of an illness on 29 December.

Orford was put in ordinary in July 1776 at Chatham. She was then fitted to serve as a hospital ship at Sheerness Dockyard between January and March 1777, for the purpose of which her command was given to Lieutenant Richard Vavasor. Orford continued in her role as a hospital ship, with command changing to Lieutenant Joseph Novil Eastwood in 1782.

== Fate ==
In June 1783 Orford was sunk as a breakwater at Sheerness.
