= HMS Nile (1806) =

Cutter of the Royal Navy

History

United Kingdom
- Name: HMS Nile
- Namesake: Battle of the Nile
- Acquired: November 1806
- Fate: Sold 1810 but then broken up 1811

General characteristics
- Tons burthen: 166 20/94 (bm)
- Propulsion: Sails
- Complement: 55
- Armament: 12 × 12-pounder carronades

The British Royal Navy purchased HMS Nile on 3 November 1806. She was the hired armed cutter Nile. After a brief, undistinguished career, the Navy sold her in 1810 only to have to break her up in 1811.

== Career ==
Between 15 November 1806 and 13 January 1807 Nile was at Portsmouth undergoing repairs. Lieutenant James Lloyd had commissioned her in November 1806.

On 12 February HMS Atalante was wrecked off the Île de Ré, near Rochefort. She had been cruising to watch enemy vessels in Rochefort when she hit the Grande Blanche rock. Despite attempts to lighten her that included cutting away her masts, she continued to founder. At daybreak three British vessels approached and took off the crew, enduring fire from shore batteries as they did so. The first was Nile, followed later by the frigates Penelope and Pomone.

Lloyd proved a disappointment.

Lieutenant Lloyd always in his cabin — sea sick, I suppose, ... [Nile] has been no manner of use to Commodore Keats, nor will be to anyone, unless an officer who is a cutter sailor has the direction of her. Little Simmons of Plymouth would do it well.

— Admiral John Jervis, Earl St Vincent (9 March 1807)

Within 1807, Lieutenant Thomas Johnson, who had commanded the hired armed cutter Nile, replaced Lloyd. Unfortunately, Johnson was imprisoned for smuggling.

Lieutenant Symons replaced Johnson for the Channel, but on 4 December Symons sailed for the Mediterranean. On 25 December 1807 she captured Industry. At about the same time, Nile also detained, and sent into Dartmouth Æolus, Angel, master, which had been sailing from Caediz to St Petersburg.

At end-April 1809 Symons brought Nile into Falmouth with dispatches from Lisbon and Seville. These were rushed overland to London. Nile then sailed to Plymouth.

== Fate ==
The "Principal Officers and Commissioners of His Majesty's Navy" sold Nile on 18 October 1810. However the purchaser withdrew from the sale. The Navy then broke her up at Plymouth in November 1811.
