= Battalion (1795 ship) =

Ship launched at Whitby in 1795

History

Great Britain
- Name: Battalion
- Builder: John Barry
- Launched: 1795, Whitby
- Captured: 1797
- Fate: Last listed 1797

General characteristics
- Tons burthen: 200, or 211, or 212 (bm)
- Complement: 18
- Armament: 10 × 9-pounder guns

Battalion was launched at Whitby in 1795. She traded with the Baltic and then in 1796 became a Liverpool-based West Indiaman. A French privateer captured her in 1797 in a single ship action as Battalion was outbound on her first voyage to Jamaica. The Royal Navy quickly recaptured her. She was last listed in Lloyd's Register (LR) in 1797.

Battalion first appeared in Lloyd's Register in 1795.

Year	Master	Owner	Trade	Source
1797	T.Banks	J.Atty	London–Gothenburg	LR
1797	T.Banks; Thomas Oxton	J.Atty; Litt & Co.	London–Gothenburg; Liverpool–Jamaica	LR

Battalion was sold to Liverpool in 1796. Her new owners sailed her as a West Indiaman.

Captain Thomas Oxton acquired a letter of marque on 4 January 1797. On 29 January Battalion, Oxton, master, was sailing from Liverpool to Jamaica when the French privateer Jeune Emilie captured her at 45°53′N 10°30′W, after an engagement between the two vessels of three-quarters of an hour. Jeune Emilie was armed with 10 guns and eight swivel guns, and had a crew of 80 men. (Note: Jeune Émilie was a 60-ton (bm) brigantine built in the USA and commissioned as a privateer in Saint Malo in February 1793. She was under Jacqus Dupuy-Fromy with 69 men and 12 carriage guns (five 4-pounders and seven 3-pounders), plus 12 swivel guns. She was decommissioned in April 1793. The French government requisitioned her prior to July 1794 and commissioned her.The French Navy renamed her Isolé in May 1795, but reverted to Jeune Émilie in 1796. In 1796 the Navy returned her to her owners. They commissioned her as a privateer in 1796 under A. Le Bedel, with 60 to 62 men and 16 guns. Le Bedel was an experienced captain. He had been second captain of Jeune Émilie in 1793 and had taken command of her when Dupuy-Fromy fell ill.)

On 11 February HMS Triton took the 10-gun privateer brig Jeune Emilie, which was forty days out of Saint-Malo and had taken the sloop Friendship as well as the 10-gun letter of marque Battalion. Triton captured Jeune Émilie at 49°10′N 12°24′W.

Battalion was sold for Livres 93,249, about £stg3800.
