= Hired armed vessel Sir Thomas Pasley =

The Royal Navy employed two vessels designated as His Majesty's Hired armed vessel Sir Thomas Pasley during the French Revolutionary Wars. The two vessels were named for Admiral Sir Thomas Pasley. The vessels are also sometimes described as cutters, but more generally as brigs. The Spanish captured the first Sir Thomas Pasley. The second had a brief, but highly productive, career that later led to her crew qualifying for the Naval General Service Medal. After she was returned to her owners in March 1802, she may have been wrecked in the Mediterranean that same year.

Records of their service are far from complete and even their name is ambiguous as contemporary records refer to them interchangeably as Admiral Pasley, Pasley, and Sir Thomas Pasley. (The National Maritime Museum's database has all three names, with considerable overlap in the service notes.) Sometimes the vessel is referred to as Paisley, Admiral Paisley, or Sir Thomas Paisley.

== First Sir Thomas Pasley ==
One account describes this vessel as the hired brig Pasley, of 204 83/94 tons burthen (bm), and armed with two 6-pounder bow chasers and twelve 12-pounder carronades. she served the Royal Navy from 18 September 1800 to 9 December 1800. (Note: This same account reports that Pasley was a former French prize. However, this is verifiable for the second hired armed vessel Sir Thomas Pasley, but not this one.)

She had a crew of 44 men and boys under the command of Lieutenant Charles Niven, or Nevin. (Note: The National Maritime Museum records (and others) give the commander's name as Lieutenant J.C. Nevis, though most give the name as "Nevin".) She left Plymouth on 17 October with despatches for Lisbon, Gibraltar, and Tetuan Bay. She returned to Plymouth on 10 November in a remarkably quick round trip. She then left again on 22 November with despatches for Lisbon, Gibraltar, and Malta. Flora was to have carried the dispatches but she had grounded in The Hamoaze.

On 10 December Pasley was off Ceuta when one, or perhaps two, Spanish gunboats engaged her. Spanish sources report that the attacker was the Spanish gunboat San Francisco Javier, alias Poderoso, from Cadiz. Poderoso was armed with one 24-pounder and two 6-pounder guns, and under the command of Miguel Villalba. All accounts agree that a gunboat sat on Pasley's stern and proceeded to fire on her with the gunboat's long gun. The lack of wind prevented Pasley from turning to bring her two bow chasers into action. The location of the carronades thwarted attempts to bring the guns to the stern. (Had Pasley not had to rush to carry the dispatches to Gibraltar, she would have been modified at Plymouth to enable the guns to be moved to the stern when necessary.)

After a two-hour resistance, Nevin struck. He had been wounded three times, and the master had been wounded as well. In all, Pasley suffered three men killed and eight wounded of her crew of 45 men. The court martial of Nevin absolved him of any culpability. The Spanish took Pasley into Ceuta and then Algeciras. Nevin wrote from Algeciras on 10 December briefly describing the action and reporting that he and his wounded men were recovering rapidly.

== Second Sir Thomas Pasley ==
On 3 February 1801, Lieutenant James Nicholson of HM hired armed schooner Suwarrow captured the French brig Jeune Annette (or Jeune Nannette). Jeune Annette, under Lieutenant de vaisseau Feuqueux, was armed with 18 guns and had a crew of 45 men. She had been sailing from Cayenne to Bordeaux with a cargo of "anatto, dye wood, elephants teeth, etc." and a number of deported priests, who were emaciated after their confinement. Because Suworow had previously sent in four Danish vessels, Suwarrow had only 16 men and boys on board when she chased and captured Jeune Annette. Jeunne Annette came into Plymouth. There orders arrived on 11 April that she be surveyed in preparation for being taken into the navy.

The Naval Chronicle reported on 24 April "That beautiful brig La Jeune Annette, now Paisley, of sixteen six-pounders, is commissioned, and the command given to Lieutenant W. Wooldridge, late of the Centaur." Other records describe the vessel as the cutter Sir Thomas Pasley, of 16 cannons (two 12-pounder chase guns and fourteen 12-pounder carronades), and 162 74/94 tons (bm). This record states that Sir Thomas Pasley served the Royal Navy as a hired vessel from 20 May to 6 March 1802. (Note: The National Maritime Museum records (and others) give the commander's name as Lieutenant W. Woolridge, though the lieutenant signed his name "Wooldridge".)

On 23 May Pasley was ready for sea. She sailed on 2 June with dispatches for the Channel Fleet. She returned six days later to Plymouth with dispatches from Admiral the Honourable Cornwallis, off Brest. On the way Wooldridge chased a French lugger of 16 guns and a cutter of 12 guns, but lost them in the fog. When the fog lifted, he sighted the cutter some distance to leeward, but being under orders to deliver the dispatches immediately, declined to resume the chase. Pasley sailed on 9 June with dispatches. Then on 15 June Pasley sailed from Plymouth as part of a squadron under Admiral Sir James Saumarez. The squadron had supplies for five months and sealed orders that the admiral was not to open until they had crossed a certain latitude. As it turned out, Saumarez was under orders to establish a blockade of Cadiz.

On 25 June Pasley captured the Spanish privateer felucca Golondrina off Cape St. Vincent. Golondrina was armed with two guns and small arms, and had a crew of 33 men, nine of whom were away as prize crews on a Guernsey lugger and a Portuguese schooner that Golondrina had captured.

In early July Saumarez sent Pasley to try to find Rear-admiral Sir John Borlase Warren. Pasley sailed as far as Malta but was unable to locate the rear-admiral.

Then on 21 July Pasley was on her way back to Menorca when at 7am, six or seven leagues south west of the island of Carbera, she encountered a Spanish naval xebec of 22 guns. An engagement that lasted an hour and a half developed in which Pasley lost one man killed and two wounded. Pasley succeeded in silencing the xebec, which however escaped to Ivica by nightfall. The wind had fallen away and both vessels resorted to their sweeps, with the xebec being faster.

Eight days after that, on 29 July, Pasley was off Cape Tresforcas. There she captured the Spanish privateer schooner Atamara. Atamara was pierced for 14 guns, but only mounted seven 6 and 12-pounder guns. She had a crew of 55 men, was ten days out of Malaga, and had taken a schooner from Oran that had been carrying cattle to Gibraltar.

Pasley's most costly victory came on 28 October. She was some 20 leagues E.S.E. of Cape de Gat when she encountered a Spanish polacca that commenced to give chase, and drew close. A battle ensued that lasted about an hour when Wooldridge, realizing that most of Pasley's rigging had been shot away, decided that her only hope was to run into the polacca and board her. Pasley ran across the polacca's hawse and lashed her bowsprit to Pasley's capstan. The British boarded and after a hand-to-hand battle of about 15 minutes, prevailed even though the Spaniards had 40 more men. The Spanish polacca was the privateer Virgine de Rosario, of Malaga. She was pierced for 20 guns and mounted 12, two 24-pounder and eight 12-pounder guns. She had been out 20 days but had not captured anything.

Virgine de Rosario had commenced the fight with a crew of 94 men. The battle cost her her first and second captains killed, as well as another 19 officers and men killed. She also had 13 men wounded. Pasley had three men killed and eight men wounded, out of a crew of 53 men. One of the wounded was Wooldrige, who had been shot through the shoulder. Subsequently, the master, one of Pasley's wounded, died of his wounds.

Admiral Suamarez promoted Wooldridge to the rank of Commander for his heroism. In December Wooldridge and Pasley returned to England. From there he wrote that his wound still had not healed. In 1847 the Admiralty awarded the Naval General Service Medal with clasp "Pasley 28 Octr. 1801". Wooldridge's next command was Scourge.

Wooldridge's successor as captain of Pasley was Lieutenant Morris, who replaced Wooldridge in or before February 1802. Morris sailed from Gibraltar on 9 February 1802 and arrived at Plymouth on 24 February.

The Treaty of Amiens, signed 25 March 1802, ended the French Revolutionary Wars. Shortly before, the Royal Navy returned Sir Thomas Pasley to her owners. The next mention of a vessel by that name is a report in December in Lloyd's List that the Sir Thomas Pasley, Neale, master, had run on shore at the island of Majorca while on a voyage from Newfoundland to Leghorn. Another report had the brig Sir Thomas Pasley driven ashore and wrecked at Menorca while on a voyage from Newfoundland to Naples, Kingdom of Sicily.
