= Molly (1759 ship) =

British merchant ship and whaler 1759–1806

History

Great Britain
- Name: Molly
- Launched: 1759
- Captured: 1806

General characteristics
- Tons burthen: 273, or 290, or 300 (bm)
- Armament: 1781: 6 × 6-pounder + 6 × 9-pounder guns; 1794: 6 × 6-pounder guns

Molly was launched in the Thirteen Colonies in 1759, probably under the same name. From 1776 on she was a whaler, sailing to the northern whale fishery from Kingston-on-Hull. She made annual whaling voyages until 1806 when a French frigate captured her.

== Career ==
Molly first appeared in an online copy of Lloyd's Register in 1776. Although there is no readily accessible data on her career before 1775, apparently she had made 32 annual whaling voyages prior to her capture in 1806, which suggests that she had been whaling since 1774. She made the sixth most whaling voyages of any northern whale fishery whaler.

The whaling season lasted from March to July–August, or so. Favourable conditions could result in short seasons; in 1799 Molly sailed to Greenland on 17 March and returned to Hull 87 days later, on 12 June, with a good catch. When not whaling, the vessels would frequently engage in the coal or Baltic trades, though with a crew a third of the size of that they required for whaling.

Year	Master	Owner	Trade	Source
1776	Jn.Potts	B.Thompson; B.Blaydes	Memel–Hull; Hull–Greenland	LR

Captain Potts remained Molly's master until 1786.

Year	Master	Whales	Tuns whale oil	Seals
1775		0	0	0
1776	Potts	3	28.25	0
1777	Potts	6	110	0
1778		2	36.5	0
1779	Potts	11	92	15
1780	Potts	9	70	0
1781	Potts	7	100.5	0
1782	Potts	14	87.5	0
1783		8	60	0
1784			100.5	
1785	Potts	1	24.5	0

Year	Master	Owner	Trade	Source
1786	Potts; Edward Hall	Tong & Co.	Hull–Greenland	LR; good repair 1774, & new wales 1782

Year	Master	Whales	Tuns whale oil	Seals
1786	Hall	9		427
1787	Hall	4	86.5	0

In 1787 Molly was in Greenland when she took an extremely large whale.

The largest whale I ever heard of was got in Greenland by Molly of Hull in 1787. It yielded no less than 40 tuns (the old-fashioned tun), and I believe it was the largest fish that ever was known to be got.

— Smith

That same year Chance gathered one whale. However, Molly claimed it. The matter went to court and on 30 November 1787 the judge found for the plaintiff. The judge awarded Molly £478.

Year	Master	Whales	Tuns whale oil	Seals
1788	Hall	7	60	7
1789	Hall	1	9	140
1790		8	88	0
1791	Hall			
1792	Hall	3	35	0
1793	Hall	9	66.5	0
1794	Hall			

Year	Master	Owner	Trade	Source & notes
1795	E.Hall; N.Newham	Gilder & Co.	Hull–Greenland	LR; good repair 1774, new wales 1782, damages repaired 1790, & good repair 1793

Year	Master	Whales	Tuns whale oil	Seals
1795	Newham			

Year	Master	Owner	Trade	Source & notes
1796	Newham; A.Sadler	Gilder & Co.	Hull–Greenland	LR; good repair 1774, new wales 1782, damages repaired 1790, & good repair 1793

Year	Master	Whales	Tuns whale oil	Seals
1796	Sadler	8	98	0
1797	Sadler	12 (full ship)	150	0
1798				
1799	Sadler	11 (full ship)	176.5	0
1800	Sadler	13	131.75	0
1801	Sadler	29	219	0
1802		16	204.25	0
1803	Sadler	7	167.5	0
1804		19	192.5	0
1805	Sadler	18	140	18
1806	Sadler	0	0	0

== Fate ==
In 1806 Molly was attempting to "double the ice", in fog, when she encountered the French frigate Sirène, which captured her. Lloyd's List reported in July 1806 that the frigate had captured the whalers Lion, of Liverpool, and Molly, of Hull. (Note: The report was partially in error. Lion had not been taken and returned to Liverpool in late July or so. She went on to whale until at least 1816.) In August Lloyd's List reported that a French frigate had taken Molly, Sadler.

In 1806, 40 vessels sailed for the whale fisheries. Molly had made 32 whaling voyages, making her among the most long-lived whalers.
