= Sir Richard Strachan, 6th Baronet =

Royal Navy Admiral (1760–1828)

Admiral Sir Richard Strachan GCB Bt
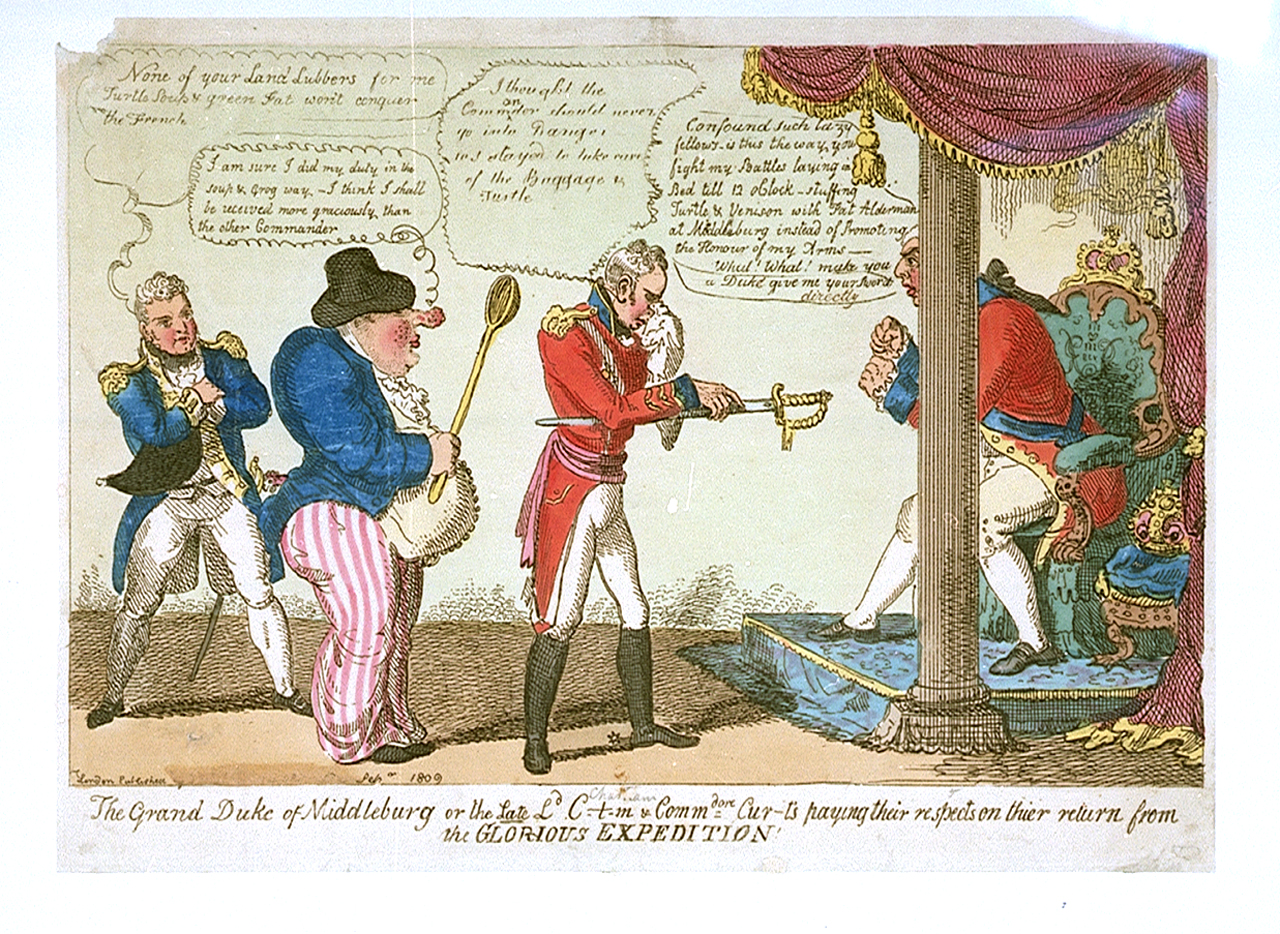
- Strachan (far left) in a political cartoon mocking the Walcheren Campaign's failure
- Born: 27 October 1760; Devon, England
- Died: 3 February 1828 (aged 67); London, England
- Relatives: John Strachan (Uncle)
- Military career
- Allegiance: Great Britain; United Kingdom
- Branch: Royal Navy
- Service years: 1772–1828
- Rank: Admiral
- Commands: HMS Lizard; HMS Naiad; HMS Vestal; HMS Phoenix; HMS Concorde; HMS Melampus; HMS Diamond; HMS Captain; HMS Donegal; HMS Caesar
- Conflicts: American War of Independence; Battle of Porto Praya; Battle of Sadras; French Revolutionary Wars; Action of 23 April 1794; War of the Third Coalition; Battle of Cape Ortegal; War of the Fifth Coalition; Walcheren Campaign
- Awards: GCB

Admiral Sir Richard John Strachan, 6th Baronet, GCB (27 October 1760 – 3 February 1828) was a Royal Navy officer who served in the American War of Independence and French Revolutionary and Napoleonic Wars, eventually rising to the rank of admiral. "Sir Dicky", as his friends referred to him, was the last chief of Clan Strachan. His baronetcy became dormant in 1854 as he died without a male heir.

== Early life ==
Strachan was born in Devon on 27 October 1760, the eldest son of Lieutenant Patrick Strachan RN and a daughter of Captain Pitman RN. His uncle was Sir John Strachan, fifth baronet. Strachan entered the Royal Navy in 1772 at the age of twelve, serving first aboard HMS Intrepid. He sailed with Intrepid to the East Indies, before moving to HMS Orford, then under the command of his uncle. He went on to serve in a number of different ships on the North American Station, first aboard HMS Preston under Commodore William Hotham, followed by HMS Eagle, the flagship of Lord Howe.

== Early career ==
Strachan went on to serve aboard HMS Actaeon off the coast of Africa, and in the West Indies. On the death of his uncle on 26 December 1777, he succeeded to the baronetcy. He was promoted to lieutenant on 5 April 1779 and was then appointed to HMS Hero in early 1781, under the command of Captain James Hawker. Aboard Hero Strachan was part of Commodore George Johnstone's squadron, and was present at the Battle of Porto Praya against the Bailli de Suffren on 16 April 1781. After this action, Hero moved on to the East Indies, where Strachan moved to take up a post, first aboard HMS Magnanime and then aboard HMS Superb. It was whilst aboard Superb that Strachan was present at the first of four actions that took place between Sir Edward Hughes and de Suffren, the Battle of Sadras on 17 February 1782.

== First commands ==
After acquitting himself well, Strachan was promoted by Hughes in January 1783 to the command of the cutter HMS Lizard, and then again on 26 April 1783 to be captain of the corvette Naiad. Strachan's next appointment was in 1787 to HMS Vestal. He sailed in the spring of 1788 for China, carrying the ambassador, the Hon. Charles Alan Cathcart. Cathcart died during the journey, as Vestal passed through the Strait of Banca, and the ship returned to England. Strachan and Vestal were then ordered to the East Indies again, to join a squadron under the command of Commodore William Cornwallis.

On arrival, Strachan was reassigned to HMS Phoenix. In November 1791 she was ordered to stop and search the French frigate Résolue, which was escorting a number of merchant ships believed to be carrying military supplies to support Tippu Sultan. Résolue resisted Phoenix and a brief fight ensued before Résolue struck her colours. Trublet de Villejégu, captain of Résolue, insisted on considering his ship as a British prize, so Cornwallis ordered Strachan to tow her into Mahé and return her to the French commodore.

== Off the French coast ==
Strachan returned to England in 1793, and was appointed to command the frigate HMS Concorde and in spring 1794 joined a squadron patrolling off Brest, under the command of Sir John Borlase Warren. The squadron engaged a rival squadron of four French frigates on 23 April 1794 and succeeded in capturing three of them. Strachan and Concorde had forced the surrender of one of them, the frigate L'Engageante. Strachan was then appointed to the 42-gun HMS Melampus which was attached in the summer to the main British fleet. In spring 1795 Strachan was dispatched in command of a squadron of five frigates to cruise off the Normandy and Brittany coasts. He was highly successful at this, capturing or destroying a considerable number of French coastal craft, many laden with military stores and conveyed by armed French warships. On 9 May 1795, he captured Crache-feu, a French three-gun vessel.

=== Command of the Diamond and the Captain ===
In 1796 Strachan was appointed to command HMS Diamond, after her previous captain, Sir Sidney Smith had been captured during a cutting-out expedition. On 31 December 1796, Strachan captured the French 12-gun brig Amaranthe, which the Royal Navy took into service as HMS Amaranthe.

Strachan commanded Diamond until 1799, when he took command of the 74-gun third rate HMS Captain. He took her off the west coast of France, at times operating as part of a squadron, and at other times alone. On 5 November 1800 he came to the assistance of the stranded and sinking HMS Marlborough, which had struck a ledge of rocks near Isle Grouat during the previous night's gale. Captain's boats were pushed through the surf and were able to take off Marlborough's officers and crew.

Later that month, on 17 November, Captain chased a French convoy through the Teignouse Passage between Quiberon and the Ile de Houat, and tried to keep them from reaching safety in the Gulf of Morbihan. Despite his efforts, the convoy reached the cover of a 20-gun corvette, and a number of coastal forts the next day. The situation changed when the hired armed cutter Nile attacked the corvette and forced her aground in Port Navalo. The corvette struck her colours, at which point boats from HMS Magicienne attempted to board and capture her. They were driven off by fire from the corvette and returned to Magicienne. Strachan meanwhile devised a plan to attack the French.

Later that day, Magicienne was ordered to approach, to draw the fire of the batteries. Strachan ordered Lieutenant Hannah and a party of seamen and marines into four boats, which were towed into the harbour by Suwarrow; while Nile and HMS Lurcher towed another four more boats manned by Marlborough's men who had been rescued by Strachan three weeks previously. Under heavy fire of grape, round and musket-balls from the shore battery high above, they boarded the corvette, and set her on fire. They then re-embarked and began heading back towards Captain, when the corvette blew up with a tremendous explosion. The British lost only one man killed, when a shot hit the fluke of Suwarrow's anchor, ricocheted, and struck the head of a sailor. Seven others were injured.

In January 1801, Strachan almost died when Captain struck a rock off Ushant with such force that she started taking on water at almost 3 inches a minute, which constantly increased. The damage was so severe that the incoming water nearly overloaded the pumps. She eventually made it into the Sound on 11 January attended by HMS Fisgard and the cutter from HMS Lord Nelson. Captain fired distress guns until she reached the narrows, when all the boats from the dock and the fleet came out to assist her. Captain eventually made it to the Hamoaze, and went back into Cawsand Bay on 5 May.

=== Command of the Donegal ===
In 1802 Strachan was appointed to command HMS Donegal. Whilst serving aboard her, he was made senior officer at Gibraltar and ordered to watch the combined French and Spanish fleet at Cádiz, under the orders of Nelson. Whilst on this station, she spotted and gave chase to the large 42-gun Spanish frigate Amfitrite in November 1804. After pursuing her for 46 hours, Amfitrite lost her mizzen-top-mast and was subsequently overhauled by Donegal.

A boat was dispatched from Donegal and the Spanish captain was brought aboard. Strachan did not speak Spanish and the captain did not speak English, so it was with difficulty that Strachan attempted to inform him that his orders were to return the Amfitrite back to Cádiz. Strachan allowed the captain three minutes to decide whether he would comply with the order, but after waiting for six minutes without an answer, opened fire on Amfitrite. The engagement lasted only eight minutes, and resulted in a number of deaths, including the Spanish captain, who fell to a musket ball. Amfitrite surrendered and after being searched, was found to be laden with stores and carrying dispatches from Cádiz to Tenerife and Havana. She was taken over and later commissioned into the Navy as HMS Amfitrite. Donegal would later make another capture off Cádiz, taking a Spanish vessel carrying a cargo reputed to be worth £200,000.

== After Trafalgar ==
Annuity to Sir Richard Strachan Act 1806
- Act of Parliament
- Parliament of the United Kingdom
- Long title: An Act to enable his Majesty to grant a certain annuity to rear-admiral Sir Richard Strachan baronet, in consideration of the eminent services which he has rendered to his Majesty and the publick.
- Citation: 46 Geo. 3. c. 5
- Territorial extent: United Kingdom

Dates
- Royal assent: 28 February 1806
- Commencement: 28 February 1806 (Note: The Acts of Parliament (Commencement) Act 1793.)
- Repealed: 6 August 1872
Other legislation
Repealed by	Statute Law Revision Act 1872

Status: Repealed

Text of statute as originally enacted

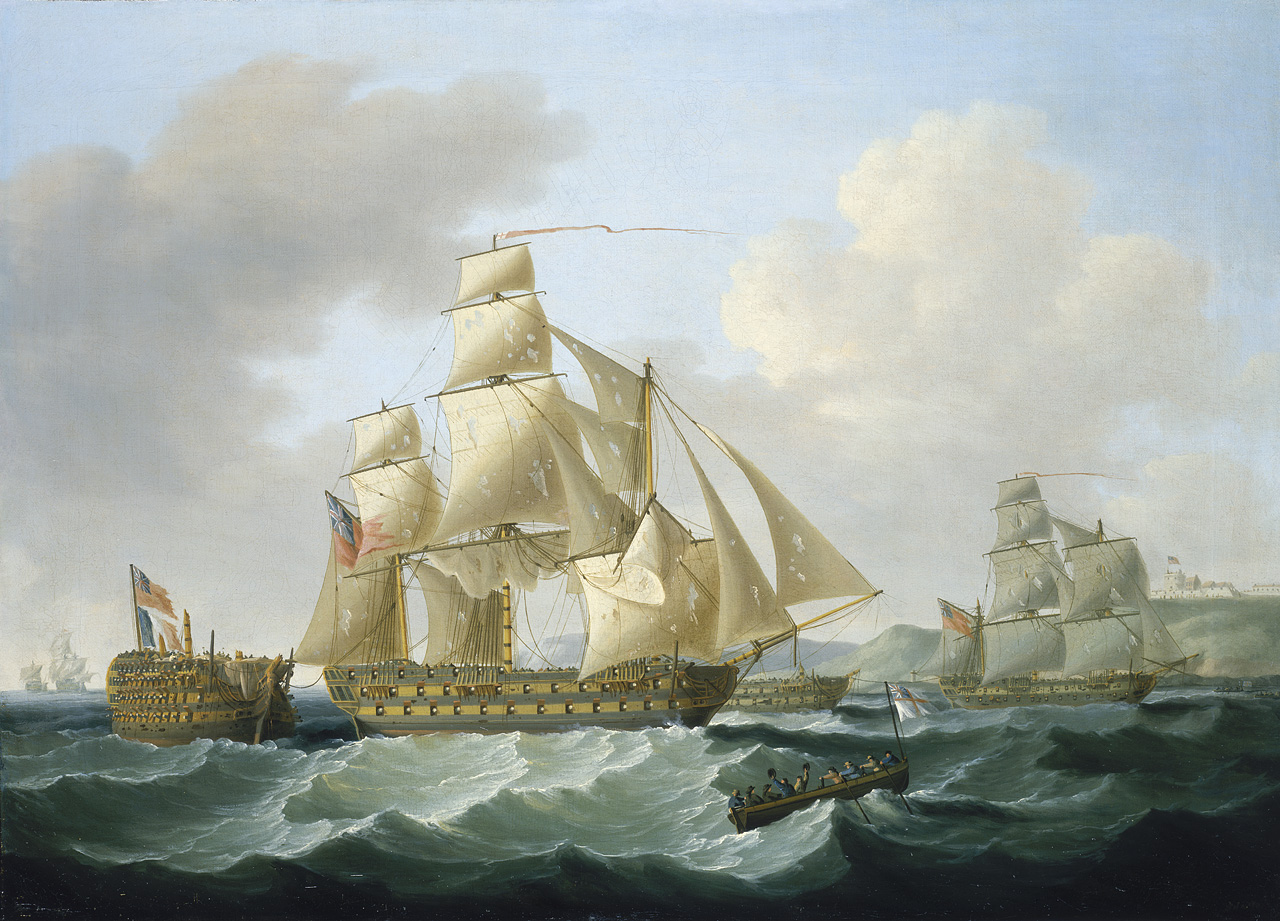
The Battle of Cape Ortegal, in which Strachan completed the destruction of the French fleet at Trafalgar

On 23 April 1804 Strachan was made a Colonel of Marines, and returned to England in HMS Renown. On arrival he was immediately appointed to HMS Caesar and placed in command of a detached squadron including three ships of the line and four frigates in the Bay of Biscay. Whilst sailing off Cape Finisterre on 2 November 1805, the squadron encountered four French ships of the line that had escaped from the Battle of Trafalgar under the command of Rear-Admiral Dumanoir le Pelley. Strachan pursued them, bringing them to battle on 4 November. After a short engagement, known as the Battle of Cape Ortegal, he captured all of them, completing the destruction of the French fleet. Strachan was promoted to the rank of Rear-Admiral of the Blue on 9 November 1805. When, on 28 January 1806, the thanks of both Houses of Parliament were voted to those who had fought at Trafalgar, Strachan and his command was specially included. He was also, by special act of Parliament, the Annuity to Sir Richard Strachan Act 1806 (46 Geo. 3. c. 5), rewarded with a pension of £1,000 a year. On 29 January he was created a Knight Companion of the Order of the Bath (KB), and the City of London voted him the freedom of the city, and awarded him a sword of honour.

== Later career ==
Strachan was soon back in service, being dispatched early in 1806 to search for a French squadron reported to have sailed for America. After searching for some time, he failed to locate it and instead returned to watch the port of Rochefort. Thick fog and poor weather covered the port in January 1808, and allowed the French to sail out undetected and escape to the Mediterranean. Strachan gave chase, joining Admiral Collingwood's forces, but the French were able to gain the safety of Toulon. Strachan was ordered to return home, where, in 1809, he became Commander-in-Chief, North Sea, watching the Dutch coast.

On 9 June 1809, he was appointed as the naval commander of an expedition, consisting of 264 warships and 352 transports carrying 44,000 troops, to attack the island of Walcheren and destroy the French arsenals in the Scheldt. Strachan was ill-qualified for the position, lacking both the experience and the temperament to hold a joint command in such a complex combined operation. Whilst he was careful to attend to the details of the problems that the Navy might encounter, he failed to consider the army's problems. Relations with the army's commander, John Pitt, 2nd Earl of Chatham, quickly became strained and the ambitious Walcheren Campaign ended up being abandoned, having only achieved the capture of Flushing. A period of angry recriminations followed the withdrawal, with Chatham presenting a narrative to King George III in 1810, blaming Strachan for the expedition's failure. Strachan defended himself, declaring that the ships had done all that had been required of them. He nevertheless became the scapegoat for the failure, and was not given any more assignments.

The confusion and conflicting accounts led to the following doggerel verse:

Great Chatham, with his sabre drawn,

Stood waiting for Sir Richard Strachan;
Sir Richard, longing to be at 'em,

Stood waiting for the Earl of Chatham.

== Later life ==
Despite these controversies, promotion being entirely on the basis of seniority, he was made a Rear-Admiral of the Red on 25 October 1809, a Vice-Admiral of the Blue on 31 July 1810, Vice-Admiral of the White on 12 August 1812, Vice-Admiral of the Red on 4 June 1814, and Admiral of the White on 19 July 1821. After the defeat of Napoleon, and his temporary incarceration aboard HMS Bellerophon in 1815, Strachan set out to see the man he had spent most of his career fighting to defeat. Napoleon himself was apparently aware of Strachan's deeds.

On Thursday he [Napoleon Bonaparte] gratified the spectators with his appearance frequently on the poop and gangway, on which occasions the British, as well as the French officers, stood uncovered and apart! One of his officers intimating to him, that Sir Richard Strachan was in a barge alongside, Bonaparte instantly took off his hat, and bowed to him with a smile.

The Order of the Bath was reorganised on 2 January 1815, with surviving Knights Companion becoming the first Knights Grand Cross (GCB). Strachan died at his house in Bryanston Square, London, on 3 February 1828. He had married Louisa Dillon, Marchioness of Salsa, in 1812, and together they had three daughters, but no son. The baronetcy became extinct upon his death.

== Assessment ==
Strachan became famous during his career for his ungovernable temper and violent cursing. This eventually earned him the nickname of 'Mad Dick' among his men, but he remained a popular and sought-after commander. Captain Graham Moore, the brother of Sir John Moore, described him on the eve of the Walcheren expedition as

one of those in our service whom I estimate the highest. I do not believe he has his fellow among the Admirals, unless it be Pellew, for ability, and it is not possible to have more zeal and gallantry.

Despite the failure of the venture, he was later to declare that

It is my wish to serve with Strachan, as I know him to be extremely brave and full of zeal and ardour, at the same time that he is an excellent seaman, and, tho' an irregular, impetuous fellow, possessing very quick parts and an uncommon share of sagacity and strong sense.

== Bibliography ==
a. Some confusion over which baronet he was exists. The Oxford Dictionary of National Biography lists him as the 4th, but both Debrett's and Burke's Peerage list him as the 6th.

- Thomas A. Wise, Life and Naval Career of Admiral Sir Richard J. Strachan, Baronet, G.C.B. in 'Transactions of the Royal Historical Society', Vol. 2. (1873), pp. 32–53.
- The Creevey papers, ed. H. Maxwell, 2nd edn, 2 vols. (1904)

Military offices
Preceded by Thomas Russell	Commander-in-Chief, North Sea; 1809–1810	Succeeded by Sir Edward Pellew
Baronetage of Nova Scotia
Preceded by John Strachan	Baronet (of Thornton, Kincardine); 1777–1828	Dormant
