= HMS Captain (1787) =

Ship of the line of the Royal Navy

- Captain (left) at the Battle of Cape St. Vincent

History

Great Britain
- Name: HMS Captain
- Ordered: 14 November 1782
- Builder: Batson, Limehouse Yard
- Laid down: May 1784
- Launched: 26 November 1787
- Commissioned: August 1761
- Decommissioned: 1813
- Honours and awards: Participated in: Battle of Genoa; Battle of Cape St. Vincent
- Fate: Burned and broken up, 1813

General characteristics
- Class & type: Canada-class third-rate ship of the line
- Tons burthen: 1638 63/94 (bm)
- Length: 170 ft (52 m) (gundeck)
- Beam: 46 ft 9 in (14.25 m)
- Depth of hold: 20 ft 6 in (6.25 m)
- Propulsion: Sails
- Sail plan: Full-rigged ship
- Complement: 550 officers and men
- Armament: Lower gundeck: 28 × 32-pounder guns; Upper gundeck: 28 × 18-pounder guns; QD: 14 × 9-pounder guns; Fc: 4 × 9-pounder guns

HMS Captain was a 74-gun third-rate ship of the line of the Royal Navy, launched on 26 November 1787 at Limehouse. She served during the French revolutionary and Napoleonic Wars before being placed in harbour service in 1799. An accident caused her to burn and founder in 1813. Later that year she was raised and broken up.

== French Revolutionary Wars ==
At the start of the French Revolutionary War, she was part of the Mediterranean fleet which occupied Toulon at the invitation of the Royalists in 1793 before being driven out by Revolutionary troops in an action where Napoleon Bonaparte made his name. During this operation Captain was deployed in the Raid on Genoa. In June 1796, Admiral Sir John Jervis transferred Captain Horatio Nelson from HMS Agamemnon into Captain. Jervis appointed Nelson commodore of a squadron that was first deployed off Livorno during Napoleon's march through northern Italy. In September 1796, Gilbert Elliot, the British viceroy of the Anglo-Corsican Kingdom, decided that it was necessary to clear out Capraja, which belonged to the Genoese and which served as a base for privateers. He sent Nelson, in Captain, together with the transport Gorgon, Vanneau, the cutter Rose, and troops of the 51st Regiment of Foot to accomplish this task in September. On their way, Minerva joined them. The troops landed on 18 September and the island surrendered immediately. Later that month Nelson oversaw the British withdrawal from Corsica.

In February 1797, Nelson had rejoined Jervis's fleet 25 miles west of Cape St. Vincent at the southwest tip of Portugal, just before it intercepted a Spanish fleet on 14 February. The Battle of Cape St. Vincent made both Jervis's and Nelson's names. Jervis was made Earl St Vincent and Nelson was knighted for his initiative and daring. Nelson had realised that the leading Spanish ships were escaping and wore Captain to break out of the line of battle to attack the much larger Spanish ships. Captain exchanged fire with the Spanish flagship, Santísima Trinidad, which mounted 136 guns on four decks. Later Captain closely engaged the 80-gun San Nicolás de Bari when the Spanish ship was disabled by a broadside from Excellent and ran into another ship, the 112-gun San José. With Captain hardly manoeuvrable, Nelson ran his ship alongside San Nicolás de Bari, which he boarded. Nelson was preparing to order his men to board San José next when she signalled her intent to surrender. The boarding of San Nicolás de Bari, which resulted in the taking of the two larger ships was later immortalised as 'Nelson's Patent Bridge for Boarding First Rates.'

Captain was the most severely damaged of the British ships as she was in the thick of the action for longer than any other ship. She returned to service following repairs and on 6 May 1799 sailed for the Mediterranean, where she joined Captain John Markham's squadron. After the Battle of Alexandria, a French squadron under Counter-admiral Jean-Baptiste Perrée, consisting of the 40-gun Junon, 36-gun Alceste, 32-gun Courageuse, 18-gun Salamine and the brig Alerte escaped to Genoa. On 17 June 1799, Perrée's squadron was en route from Jaffa for Toulon when it encountered the British squadron under Markham in Centaur. In the ensuing action of 18 June 1799, the British captured the entire French squadron, with Captain capturing Alerte. Markham described Alerte as a brig of 14 guns and 120 men, under the command of Lieutenant Dumay.

On 23 November 1800, Captain Richard Strachan in Captain chased a French convoy in to the Morbihan where it sheltered under the protection of shore batteries and the 20-gun corvette Réolaise. (Note: Réolaise was a British merchant vessel built in England in 1788 that the French purchased or seized, and that the French Navy had requisitioned at Bordeaux in August 1793. French records show her as having a crew of 103 men and being armed with eighteen 4-pounder guns.) Magicienne was able to force the corvette onto the shore at Port Navalo, though she got off again. The hired armed cutter Suworow then towed in four boats with Lieutenant Hennah of Captain and a cutting-out party of seamen and marines. The hired armed cutters Nile and Lurcher towed in four more boats from Magicienne. Although the cutting-out party landed under heavy fire of grape and musketry, it was able to set the corvette on fire; shortly thereafter she blew up. Only one British seaman, a crewman from Suworow, was killed. However, Suworow's sails and rigging were so badly cut up that Captain had to tow her. A French report of the action stated that Captain Duclos, seeing the approach of the British, ran Réolaise on shore and burnt her.

== Napoleonic Wars ==
In 1807 it had been one of the escorts for the expedition leaving Falmouth that would eventually attack Buenos Aires. Turned back north once the expedition reached the Cape Verde Islands.

Captain shared with Amaranthe, Pompee, and Morne Fortunee in the prize money pool of £772 3s 3d for the capture of Frederick on 30 December 1808. This money was paid in June 1829.

Captain took part in the capture of Martinique in 1809. In April 1809, a strong French squadron arrived at the Îles des Saintes, south of Guadeloupe. There they were blockaded until 14 April, when a British force under Major-General Frederick Maitland invaded and captured the islands. Captain was among the naval vessels that shared in the proceeds of the capture of the islands. (Note: The prize agent for a number of the vessels involved, Henry Abbott, went bankrupt. In May 1835 there was a final payment of a dividend from his estate. A first-class share was worth 10s 2 3/4d; a sixth-class share, that of an ordinary seaman, was worth 1d. Seventh-class (landsmen) and eighth-class (boys) shares were fractions of a penny, too small to pay.)

== Fate ==
Later that year, Captain was put into harbour service. On 22 March 1813, she was accidentally burned in the Hamoaze, off Plymouth, Devon. At the time, she was undergoing conversion to a sheer hulk. When it was clear that the fire, which had begun in the forecastle, had taken hold, her securing lines were cut and she was towed a safe distance away from the other vessels so that she could burn herself out. Even so, orders were given that she be sunk. Ships' launches with carronades then commenced a one-hour bombardment. She finally foundered after having burned down to the waterline. Two men died in the accident. The wreck was raised in July and broken up at Plymouth.
