= Hired armed cutter Nile =

During the French Revolutionary and Napoleonic Wars, the British Royal Navy employed at least two cutters designated His Majesty's hired armed cutter Nile.

== First hired armed cutter Nile ==
The first hired armed cutter Nile was of 13682/94 tons (burthen). She carried ten 12-pounder carronades and two 6-pounder bow guns. Her contract ran from 29 March 1799 to 21 November 1801. From at least May her commander was Lieutenant George Argles.

On 17 November, Captain Sir Richard Strachan in Captain chased a French convoy in to the Morbihan where it sheltered under the protection of shore batteries and the 20-gun corvette Réolaise. Lieutenant Argles skillful maneuvered Nile, as the first British vessel up, and kept the corvette from the north shore. Magicienne was then able to force the corvette onto the shore at Port Navale, though she got off again. The hired armed cutter Suworow then towed in four boats with Lieutenant Hennah of Captain and a cutting-out party of seamen and marines. Nile and the hired armed cutter Lurcher towed in four more boats from Magicienne. Although the cutting-out party landed under heavy fire of grape and musketry, it was able to set the corvette on fire; shortly thereafter she blew up. Only one British seaman, a crewman from Suworow, was killed; seven men from Captain were wounded. However, Suworow's sails and rigging were so badly cut up that Captain had to tow her. Nile captured a merchant vessel that was then burnt.

Nile and Argeles captured the brig Assistance, A.H. Stark, master, on 12 October 1800. This was the Swedish brig Assistansen, Alex Stark, master, that had been sailing from Bayonne to Stockholm with a cargo of rosin and that Nile brought into Plymouth on 22 October.

About three weeks later, on 13 November, Nile and Lurcher captured the French brig Prothee. Five days later they captured a French privateer brig of 14 guns.

On 7 December, Nile discovered a convoy of 15 or 16 small vessels coming round the point of Croisic near the mouth of the river Vilaine in Quiberon Bay. Lurcher joined Nile and together the two cutters captured or destroyed nine vessels at a cost of only one man wounded on Lurcher, despite fire from shore batteries. The four largest were decked and Argles believed that they could be sailed back to England. The others were not. The four largest had been sailing from Boulogne to Brest with cargoes of brandy and wine. They were:

- Aimable François, of 55 tons, Geldo Bouligan, master;
- Maria Joseph, of 48 tons, Pierre Midago, master;
- St Pierre, of 39 tons, Pierre Hoeck, master; and lastly,
- Notre Dame De Consolation, of 36 tons, Clouarie, master.

On 8 February 1801 Nile came into Plymouth from Quiberon with the officers of Requin, which had wrecked there, with no loss of life. However, the French had captured 20 of her men when they reached shore. Nile went in with a flag of truce to ascertain their fate. Excellent rescued those crew members of Requin that the French hadn't captured.

Earlier during this cruise, Lieutenant Argles and Nile drove on shore a cutter of sixteen 12-pounders and a lugger of twelve 9-pounders. Heavy fire from shore batteries prevented Nile from recovering them. At high tide the French were able to recover the two vessels, though fire from Nile had damaged them badly, and take them into Morbihan.

Around this time Argeles received promotion to the rank of Commander. Lieutenant T. Newton replaced him in command of Nile. On 13 May Newton brought Nile into Plymouth after a two-hour battle with a French 16-cutter in Douarnenez Bay. The French vessel, which had a large number of soldiers aboard, eventually took refuge under the guns of a large shore battery. Both vessels were much damaged and Nile suffered one man wounded. Newton believed that the French cutter had tried to disable Nile's rigging so that it could come up with and take her by boarding.

Nile shared with Confiance, Stork, and the hired armed cutter Flirt in the proceeds of the capture of San Pedro D'Alcantare. San Pedro D'Alcantare was captured on 27 July 1801. On the same day Nile also captured Egalité.

In August 1801, Nile's boats attempted to cut out a French brig sheltering in Douarnenez Bay Bay. A musket shot killed Newton and the fire from shore batteries was so intense that the boats withdrew, giving up their attempt.

On 19 November 1801 Nile departed Torbay for Plymouth to be paid off.

== 1803 ==
Nile may have been the cutter Nile, of 135 tons (bm), 30 men, and twelve 6 & 12-pounder guns, whose master, Solomon Bellevill jnr., received a letter of marque on 11 June 1803.

In August the privateer Success, of Jersey, and the cutter Nile, of Hastings, captured Union, Pancen, master. Union had been sailing from Cayenne to France. Union was off Hastings by 21 August.

== Second hired armed cutter Nile ==
The second hired armed cutter Nile had a burthen of 16620/94 tons. She carried ten 12-pounder carronades and two 6-pounder bow guns. Her contract ran from 30 May 1804 to 1 March 1805. In 1804 she was renamed Phyllis. In 1806 she resumed the name Nile and served a second contract, this time from 18 February 1806 to 12 December 1806.

1804: Nile, under the command of Lieutenant John Nugent, recaptured several vessels in 1804: Excellent (21 June), Mary of Newcastle (6 July), and Providence (7 July). Excellent, Davis, master, had been sailing from Carmarthen to London when a French privateer captured her. After Nile recaptured her, Nile sent her into Ramsgate. A French privateer had captured Mary, which had been sailing from Emsworth to Hull, and Providence, Lownsbro, master, which had been sailing from Jersey to Petersburg. Nile, operating out of Hastings, had recaptured them near Bordeaux.

On 23 July Nile recaptured Albion. Then on 3 September Nile captured Nostra Senora del Bon Voiage.

While in command of Nile, Nugent chased a praam on shore off Fecamp, recaptured five brigs, and drove on shore and destroyed, off St. Valery, the French lugger Etoile.

1806: On the evening of 14 January 1806 two French privateers anchored themselves off the harbour at Dover. The Sea Fencibles went to man their batteries, only to have sentinels turn them away. The commanding general, Lord Forbes, was away at Canterbury and the sentinels would not permit the Fencibles to proceed without his permission. At the same time Nile was in the harbour, and under the command of Thomas Johnson. A concerned citizen asked him why he did not set out to chase them away. The Times quoted him as saying:

My brave commander is gone on another station, but I expect orders to sail very soon, when be assured the cutter shall not disgrace her name

— Thomas Johnson, quoted in The Times (20 January 1806), & Grocott

The Times went on to comment:

The Nile is manned by a very brave set, who although they may not have particularly attended to the revenue of the country, would not suffer her honour to be tarnished; and when they have smuggled spirits to quaff the king's health would draw their swords and protect him with their lives.

— The Times (20 January 1806), & Grocott

A few months later Nile captured the American brig Truxton on 20 April. (Note: The share of the prize money for a petty officer was £10 7s 9d; the share of an able seaman was £1 18s 7d.) Then she captured the French chasse maree Elizabeth 30 June and the sloop Susannah Margaretta on 14 July. (Note: The share of the prize money for a petty officer was £25 15s 2d; the share of an able seaman was £4 12s 8d.)

This may be the cutter Nile that the Royal Navy purchased and registered on 3 November 1806.
