= Théobald René de Kergariou-Locmaria =

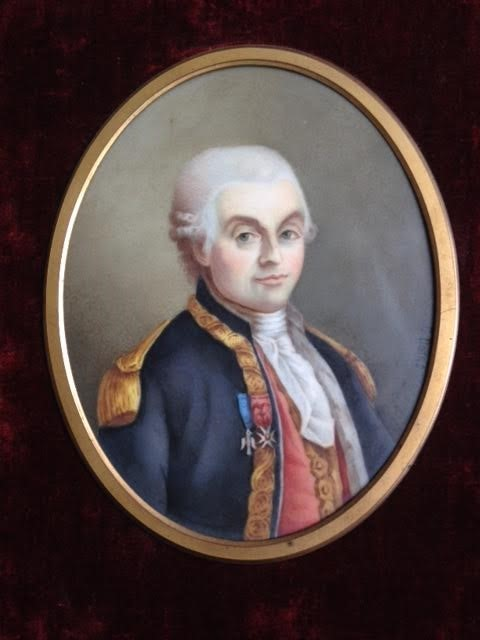
- Born: 17 September 1739
- Died: 16 July 1795 (aged 55)
- Allegiance: France
- Branch: Navy
- Rank: Ship-of-the-line captain
- Commands: Esturgeon; Serin; Oiseau; Belle Poule; Junon; Sibylle; Calypso

Théobald-René, Comte de Kergariou-Locmaria (Note: Or Thibaud-René de Kergariou-Locmaria; see Taillemite, p. 273) (17 September 1739 – 16 July 1795) was a French Navy officer who served in the American Revolutionary War.

== Career ==
Kergariou-Locmaria was born on 17 September 1739 at Coatilliau Castle, near Lannion, in a family of old nobility. He was brother to Jonathas de Kergariou-Locmaria, (Note: killed in 1765 during the Larache expedition) to Pierre-Joseph de Kergariou-Rosconnet and to Raymond-Marie de Kergariou-Coatlès.

=== Early career ===
Kergariou-Locmaria joined the Navy in the Gardes de la Marine in 1755, and served on the 50-gun Aigle, under Captain de Saint-Alouarn, in a fleet bound for Saint-Domingue and commanded by Perier.

Promoted to Ensign on 17 April 1757, he was appointed to command the batteries of the coastal defences of Saint-Domingue. He served at sea from 1758 to 1770, appointed first on Amphion and taking part in the Siege of Louisbourg, and from 1759 on Sardine.

He then served on Orient, on which he took part in the Battle of Quiberon Bay on 20 November 1759. He later served as an officer on the frigates Hébé, from 1760, and Licorne, from 1762. In Licorne, he took part in the raids against British establishments on Newfoundland, under Admiral de Ternay.

After Ternay's expedition, Kergariou-Locmaria returned to the Caribbean, serving on the frigate Comète from 1763, the 80-gun Saint-Esprit from 1764, the fluyt Balance in 1766 and eventually the frigate Belle Poule from 1769.

In February 1770, Kergariou-Locmaria was promoted to Lieutenant. In 1772, he took part in a campaign in the Indian Ocean on Belle Poule, before taking command of the fluyt Esturgeon in 1773. In 1774, he was appointed to command the 14-gun corvette Serin, on which he patrolled and captured several British slave ships. In 1775, Kergariou-Locmaria was appointed Knight of the Order of Saint-Louis.

In 1776, Kergariou served off Île de France as an officer on the 56-gun Brillant. Two years after, he was appointed to command the frigate Oiseau, part of a fleet under Orvilliers. In 1779, he returned on Belle Poule, this time as her captain.

=== Service on Junon ===
Promoted to Captain on 13 March 1779, Kergariou-Locmaria received command of the frigate Junon, on which he captured the British corvette HMS Rover, on 13 September of that year.

In May 1781, Kergariou transferred to the prestigious first-rate Royal-Louis, on which he served as first officer in Guichen's squadron.

=== Service on Sibylle ===
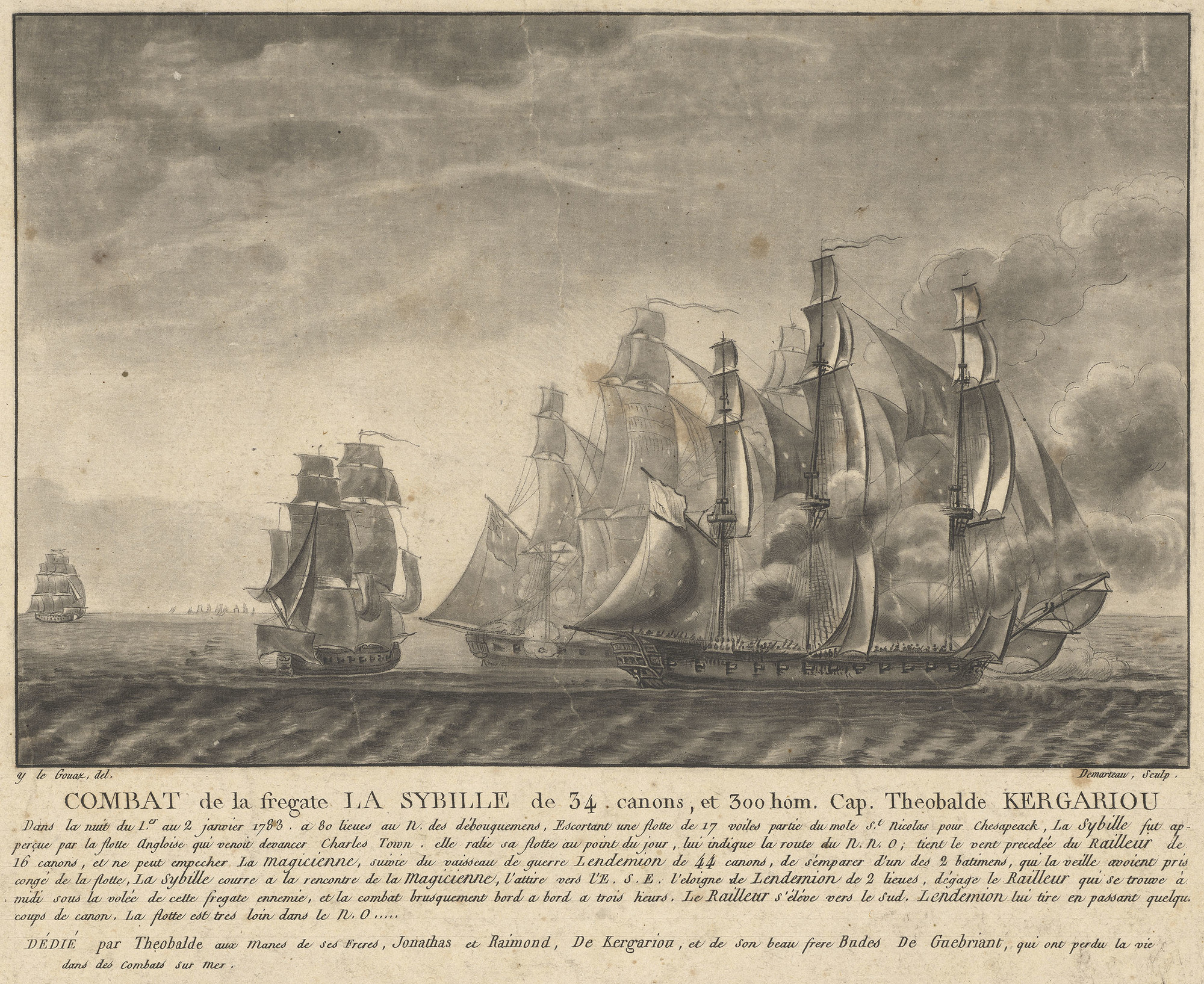
A view of the action between the French frigate Sybille and British ships on the night of 1–2 February 1783

In June 1781, Kergariou was appointed to command the 32-gun frigate Sibylle. During the action of 18 October 1782, Sibylle supported Scipion, under Grimouard.

Sibylle departed Saint-Domingue, along with the 14-gun corvette Railleur, escorting a 16-ship convoy bound for North America. On 2 January 1783, the convoy was chased by the 44-gun ship of the line HMS Endymion and the 32-gun frigates HMS Emerald and Magicienne. Kergariou-Locmaria signaled the convoy to pursue its route with the Railleur, and endeavoured to cover its retreat, first engaging Magicienne. In the ensuing exchange of fire, Kergariou-Locmaria was severely wounded, but his first officer, Morel d'Escures, took command and managed to dismast Magicienne. Sibylle retreated when the Endymion and Emerald intervened. Thomas Graves, who commanded Magicienne, later commissioned two engravings of the battle, one representing its beginning, and the other its end.

Four days later, a gale entirely dismasted Sibylle; Kergariou-Locmaria was forced to have twelve guns thrown overboard to keep his ship afloat. In distress, Sibylle was spotted by the British corvette, HMS Hussar, under Thomas McNamara Russell, yielding the action of 22 January 1783. Kergariou ordered a British flag hoisted over the French ensign, indicating that Sibylle was a British prize captured from the French, and furthermore had a yachting ensign hoisted upside down as a distress signal; Hussar was not fooled by the ruse, and Kergariou lowered the British flag and fired a broadside at Hussar to prevent her from warning the rest of the British forces of his presence. However, the yachting ensign got stuck and could not be lowered. Hussar fired a single broadside that struck Sibylle under the floating line, inundated her poweder reserves and caused leaks so severe that her pumps could not compensate. Kergariou ordered twelve more guns thrown overboard; when Hussar returned with the 50-gun HMS Centurion, Kergariou's situation became hopeless and he struck his colours after Centurion's second broadside.

Russell was infuriated with Kergariou for violating the law of war, as ships were expected to only fly a distress flag if they were actually in distress. After receiving Kergariou's sword, Russell broke it publicly and said to him:

"Sir, I must humbly beg leave to decline any compliments to this ship, her officers, or company, as I cannot return them. She is indeed no more than a British ship of her class should be. She had not fair play; but Almighty God has saved her from the most foul snare of the most perfidious enemy. Had you, Sir, fought me fairly, I should, if I know my own heart, receive your sword with a tear of sympathy. From you, Sir, I receive it with inexpressible contempt. And now, Sir, you will please observe, that lest this sword should ever defile the hand of any honest French or English officer, I here, in the most formal and public manner, break it."

Kergariou and his officers were kept under guard in Hussar's orlop, fed basic rations and were not given bedding to sleep. Once they reached New York City, Kergariou sent Charles Gabriel Morel d'Escures to see Russell, who threatened him with retaliation should he ever publish an account of the battle. D'Escures claimed that when Kergariou was released, he would use his influence at the French court to acquire another ship to hunt Russell down should that happen. When Russell failed to be moved, Kergariou, again through d'Escures, issued a duel challenge to Russell to demand personal satisfaction. Russell replied in response that "Sir I have considered your challenge maturely... I will fight him, by land or by water, on foot or on horseback, in any part of this globe that he pleases. You will, I suppose, be his second; and I shall be attended by a friend worthy of your sword."

Once they arrived in England, British Admiral Robert Digby received them with much greater courtesy. In the automatic court-martial for the loss of his ship, the allegations were brought to the attention of the court; Kergariou was honourably discharged of all accusations of wrongdoing. On 16 August 1784, Kergariou was admitted to the Society of the Cincinnati. At the end of the American War of Independence, he totalled nine campaigns in America, three journeys in the Indian Ocean, had fought in three battles and had been severely wounded.

=== French Revolution and the Battle of Quiberon ===
In 1786, Kergariou was given command of the frigate Calypso, leading a three-year expedition in the Indian Ocean.

At the beginning of the French Revolution, Kergariou-Locmaria emigrated.

He later took part in the British-sponsored Invasion of France in 1795, where he was captured by Republican forces under General Hoche. Tried by the Revolutionaries, he was sentenced to death. Geoffroy d'Antrechaux later reported that Kergariou thus addressed his troops:

You have no need for someone to give you an example on how to die; but, as your elder, I request the honour to go to be the first to walk to execution. (Note: "Vous n'avez pas besoin qu'on vous donne l'exemple de mourir; mais, comme votre ancien, je réclame l'honneur de marcher au supplice le premier." Quoted in Guérin, vol.6, p. 94)

Kergariou is also reported to have recited a memorial office to his fellow prisoners before being shot. Amongst the others executed that day was his brother Kergariou-Rosconnet.
