= HMS Endymion (1779) =

Fifth-rate of the Royal Navy

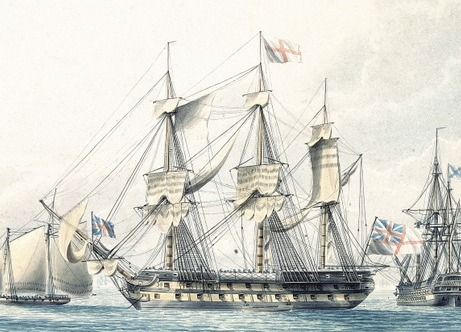
- Endymion's sister ship HMS Argo

History

Great Britain
- Name: HMS Endymion
- Ordered: 2 February 1778
- Builder: Edward Greaves, Limehouse
- Cost: £19,820
- Laid down: 18 March 1778
- Launched: 28 August 1779
- Completed: 5 November 1779
- Commissioned: July 1779
- Fate: Wrecked 22 August 1790

General characteristics
- Class & type: Roebuck-class fifth-rate
- Tons burthen: 893 59/94 (bm)
- Length: 140 ft (42.7 m) (gundeck); 115 ft 7 in (35.2 m) (keel)
- Beam: 38 ft 1 1/2 in (11.6 m)
- Draught: 10 ft 3 in (3.1 m) (forward); 14 ft 2 in (4.3 m) (aft)
- Depth of hold: 16 ft 4 in (5 m)
- Propulsion: Sails
- Complement: 300
- Armament: Lower deck: 20 × 18-pounder guns; Upper deck: 22 × 9-pounder guns; Quarterdeck: Nil; Forecastle: 2 × 6-pounder guns

HMS Endymion was a 44-gun fifth-rate Roebuck-class ship of the Royal Navy launched in 1779. Based on the design of HMS Roebuck, the class was built for use off the coast of North America during the American Revolutionary War. Commissioned by Captain Philip Carteret, Endymion spent the war serving in the English Channel and West Indies. There, she was damaged in the Great Hurricane of 1780. Sent to England for repairs, Endymion returned to the West Indies in 1782, repeating signals at the Battle of the Saintes. She was present but not engaged at the action of 2 January 1783, before being paid off towards the end of the year.

Endymion was recommissioned as an en flute troopship in 1787, conveying various regiments of foot to the West Indies, Ireland, and North America. On 22 August 1790, under the command of Lieutenant Daniel Woodriff, Endymion was carrying supplies to the Turks and Caicos Islands when she struck an uncharted rock off Turks Island. Unable to dislodge the ship, Woodriff abandoned Endymion on the following day.

== Design ==
Endymion was a 44-gun, 18-pounder Roebuck-class ship. The class was a revival of the design used to construct the fifth-rate HMS Roebuck in 1769, by Sir Thomas Slade. The ships, while classified as fifth-rates, were not frigates because they carried two gun decks, of which a frigate would have only one. Roebuck was designed as such to provide the extra firepower a ship of two decks could bring to warfare but with a much lower draught and smaller profile. From 1751 to 1776 only two ships of this type were built for the Royal Navy because it was felt that they were anachronistic, with the lower (and more heavily armed) deck of guns being so low as to be unusable in anything but the calmest of waters. (Note: This problem was demonstrated in a sister ship of Endymion, HMS Argo, which two French frigates captured in 1783 because the weather was so bad she was not able to open her lower gun ports during the battle.) In the 1750s the cruising role of the 44-gun two deck ship was taken over by new 32- and 36-gun frigates, leaving the type almost completely obsolete.

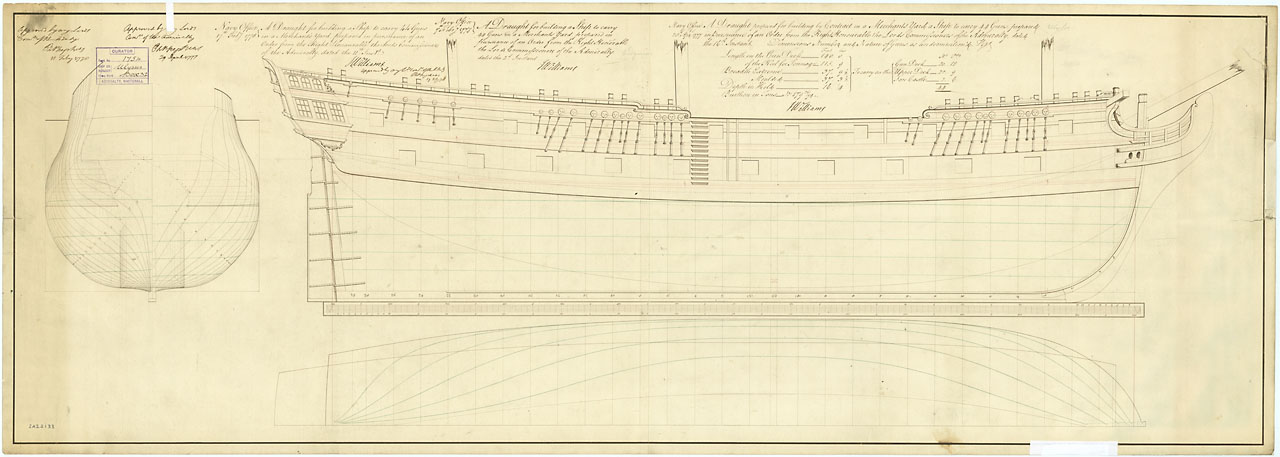
Plan of the Roebuck-class ships

When the American Revolutionary War began in 1775 a need was found for heavily armed ships that could fight in the shallow coastal waters of North America, where two-decked third-rates could not safely sail, and so the Roebuck class of nineteen ships, alongside the similar Adventure class, was ordered to the specifications of the original ships to fill this need. The frigate classes that had overtaken the 44-gun ship as the preferred design for cruisers were at this point still mostly armed with 9- and 12-pounder guns, and it was expected that the class's heavier 18-pounders would provide them with an advantage over these vessels. Frigates with larger armaments would go on to be built by the Royal Navy later on in the American Revolutionary Wars, but these ships were highly expensive and so Endymion and her brethren continued to be built as a cheaper alternative.

== Construction ==
Ships of the class built after 1782 received an updated armament, replacing the small upper deck 9-pounder guns with more modern 12-pounders. Endymion, constructed before this, followed more closely to the 1769 armament of Roebuck and did not receive these changes. All ships laid down after the first four of the class, including Endymion, had the double level of stern windows Roebuck had been designed with removed and replaced with a single level of windows, moving the style of the ships closer to that of a true frigate. (Note: While the earlier ships of the class had two levels of stern windows, there was only ever one level of cabins behind them.)

All but one ship of the class was contracted out to civilian dockyards for construction, and the contract for Endymion was given to Edward Greaves at Limehouse. Named after the mythological Endymion, the ship was ordered on 2 February 1778, laid down on 18 March and launched on 28 August 1779 with the following dimensions: 140 feet (42.7 m) along the gun deck, 115 feet 7 inches (35.2 m) at the keel, with a beam of 38 feet 1 1/2 inches (11.6 m) and a depth in the hold of 16 feet 4 inches (5 m). Her draught, which made the class so valued in the American Revolutionary War, was 10 feet 3 inches (3.1 m) forward and 14 feet 2 inches (4.3 m) aft. She measured 893 59/94 tons burthen. The fitting out process for Endymion was completed, including the addition of her copper sheathing, on 5 November at Woolwich Dockyard.

Endymion received an armament of twenty 18-pounder long guns on her lower deck, with twenty-two 9-pounders on the upper deck. These were complemented by two 6-pounders on the forecastle; the quarterdeck was unarmed. The ship had a crew of 280 men, which was increased to 300 in 1783.

== Service ==
=== English Channel ===
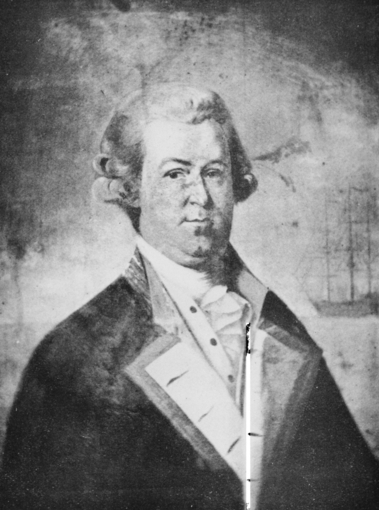
Philip Carteret, who first commissioned Endymion

Endymion was commissioned in July 1779 under the command of Captain Philip Carteret, who joined on 1 August, although newspapers initially reported that command would be given to Captain Richard Pearson. The ship began patrolling the English Channel for French shipping on 31 October. While preparing for a journey to the Guinea Coast on 15 January 1780 Endymion was badly damaged in a storm, losing her mizzenmast and cracking the mainmast. She went in to Portsmouth Dockyard to be repaired, which curtailed her activities until 26 February, when Endymion returned to the Channel.

Carteret was given command of a small blockading squadron based at Guernsey. Ordered by Admiral Sir Thomas Pye to intercept a convoy making for Cherbourg, Endymion detained two neutral Danish merchant ships; Jarlsberg on 10 April, and De Mathia four days later. While the Admiralty approved of Carteret's actions, he was later forced to pay costs and damages to the owner of De Mathia.

On 28 May the ship travelled as an escort to trade sailing to Africa, herself carrying soldiers for Goree. From there Carteret was to organise an attack on the French-controlled Senegal. He was immediately obstructed in this plan when the previous commanding officer at Goree refused to hand over to the successor Endymion had brought, providing only sixty men for any Senegal operation. Carteret abandoned the plan and sailed Endymion on to join the West Indies Station.

=== West Indies ===
Endymion arrived at Barbados on 17 September. The ship was stationed off St Lucia when the Great Hurricane of 1780 arrived there on 10 October, driving her and the other vessels present from their anchorages and dismasting them; Endymion was nearly wrecked, and Carteret badly injured in a fall during the storm. The ship limped into Port Royal on 30 October, capturing two French merchant ships that had been forced out of Martinique by the hurricane as she did so.

News travelled slowly, and until the start of 1781 Endymion was thought in England to have been destroyed in the Great Hurricane. Early in that year Carteret was ordered to sail Endymion back to England so that she could be fully repaired, at the time having only jury masts. The ship escorted a convoy as she made the journey, and captured the French 60-gun Indiaman Marquise de la Fayette, which was sailing en flute, on 3 May after a running battle of two hours. This brought the number of ships captured by Endymion in the West Indies to four. The ship arrived in Britain in July and then, to the "astonishment and mortification" of Carteret, who believed Endymion only needed relatively minor repairs, was paid off.

The ship was recommissioned by Captain Edward Smith in October 1781 and sailed to join the Leeward Islands Station on 11 February the following year. Having joined Admiral Sir George Rodney's fleet, Endymion was present at the skirmishes between the British and French fleets in the Dominica Channel on 9 April and then at the culminating Battle of the Saintes on 12 April, where she served outside of the line of battle as a repeating ship. (Note: Repeating ships stationed out of the line of battle mirrored the flag signals sent out by their admirals so that messages could be more easily spread throughout the fleet.) In July the ship sailed with Admiral Hugh Pigot to America to shelter during the hurricane months, and then in November returned to the Leeward Islands to participate in the blockade of Cape Francois as part of the Jamaica Station.

On 18 December Endymion departed Charles Town as part of the escort to a convoy of 130 ships carrying loyalists and soldiers. Making for Jamaica, on 2 January 1783 the ships encountered a Franco-American convoy of seventeen ships being escorted by the French 32-gun frigate Sibylle and 14-gun sloop Railleur. Ordered to chase the ships, Endymion was quickly overtaken by the 36-gun frigate HMS Magicienne which, off San Domingo, engaged the French vessels in the action of 2 January 1783.

Having attacked and silenced the sloop, Magicienne engaged in a close action with Sibylle for several hours. In sight of this, Endymion was unable to assist Magicienne because she was becalmed. Eventually Magicienne's masts fell, and the badly damaged Sibylle used the opportunity to disengage. An hour after this Endymion caught up with the mauled Magicienne, cheering her as she passed in an attempt to catch Sibylle. Smith failed to locate the French ship, which was eventually captured in a separate action on 22 January. Endymion returned to the British convoy on 4 January, having captured the French merchant ship Celerity whose cargo was valued at £20,000. Celerity hit a sunken rock on 9 January and was lost. Endymion was paid off later in the year.

=== Troopship ===
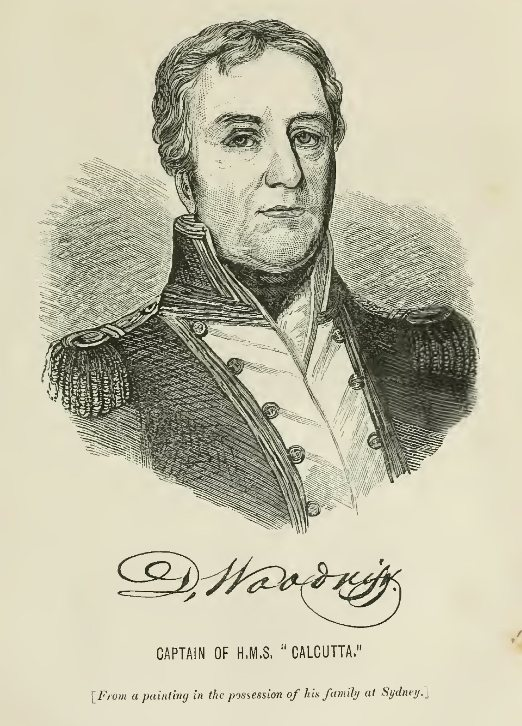
Daniel Woodriff, under whose command Endymion was wrecked off Turks Island

Endymion underwent a repair at Woolwich Dockyard between December 1783 and December 1784 at a cost of £6,291. With the American Revolutionary War having ended, the ship was not recommissioned until October 1787 when Lieutenant Joseph Sall took command of her to operate as an en flute troopship. With this change her crew decreased to 155 men. She was one of two vessels that early in the following year carried military reinforcements to the garrison at Jamaica.

Under the command of Lieutenant Daniel Woodriff from February 1789, the ship embarked the 24th Regiment of Foot at Monkstown on 29 June to convey it to Quebec. Having completed this, she departed Quebec for England on 31 July with the 53rd Regiment of Foot on board. The ship then conveyed the 8th Regiment of Foot to Guernsey in March 1790, and in the same month took the 22nd Regiment of Foot from Sheerness to Cork. Having reached North America, on 12 June Endymion sailed from Halifax, Nova Scotia, taking the 47th Regiment of Foot to the Bahamas. The ship arrived at Nassau on 2 July.

=== Loss ===
Continuing in the West Indies, on 22 August Endymion had recently finished escorting the West Indiamen Lord Hood and Wheadon through the Windward Passage. Next tasked with delivering supplies to the Turks and Caicos Islands, at about 8 a.m. the ship was sailing to the south of Turks Island in what the crew expected to be deep water. A leadline suddenly showed that Endymion was in only 7 fathoms (13 m) of water, and the ship struck an uncharted rock. One man drowned in the incident.

Woodriff attempted to dislodge the ship, hoisting out the boats, lightening the ship, and cutting away the damaged foremast. As the mast fell to the side it damaged several of the ship's boats, and Endymion did not move. Meanwhile, some members of the crew broke into the spirit room, stealing all of Woodriff's alcohol before being apprehended. Water began to breach the ship, and two hours later the crew was rescued by the passing schooner New Hope. Two officers and thirty-two seamen were taken to Jamaica, while Woodriff and the rest of the crew stayed at Turks Island. Endymion continued to fill with water the next day, while Woodriff worked to salvage stores from the ship. He had to abandon his operations as she began to sink.

The rock which Endymion struck has since been known as Endymion Rock. Endymion's wreck was still visible, lying on her beam-ends, on 14 September when the area was re-surveyed, discovering that the ship had struck a 200 yards (180 m) by 100 yards (91 m) ledge of hitherto uncharted submerged rock that was at its highest point only 4.3 feet (1.3 m) below the waterline.
