= Sibylle-class frigate =

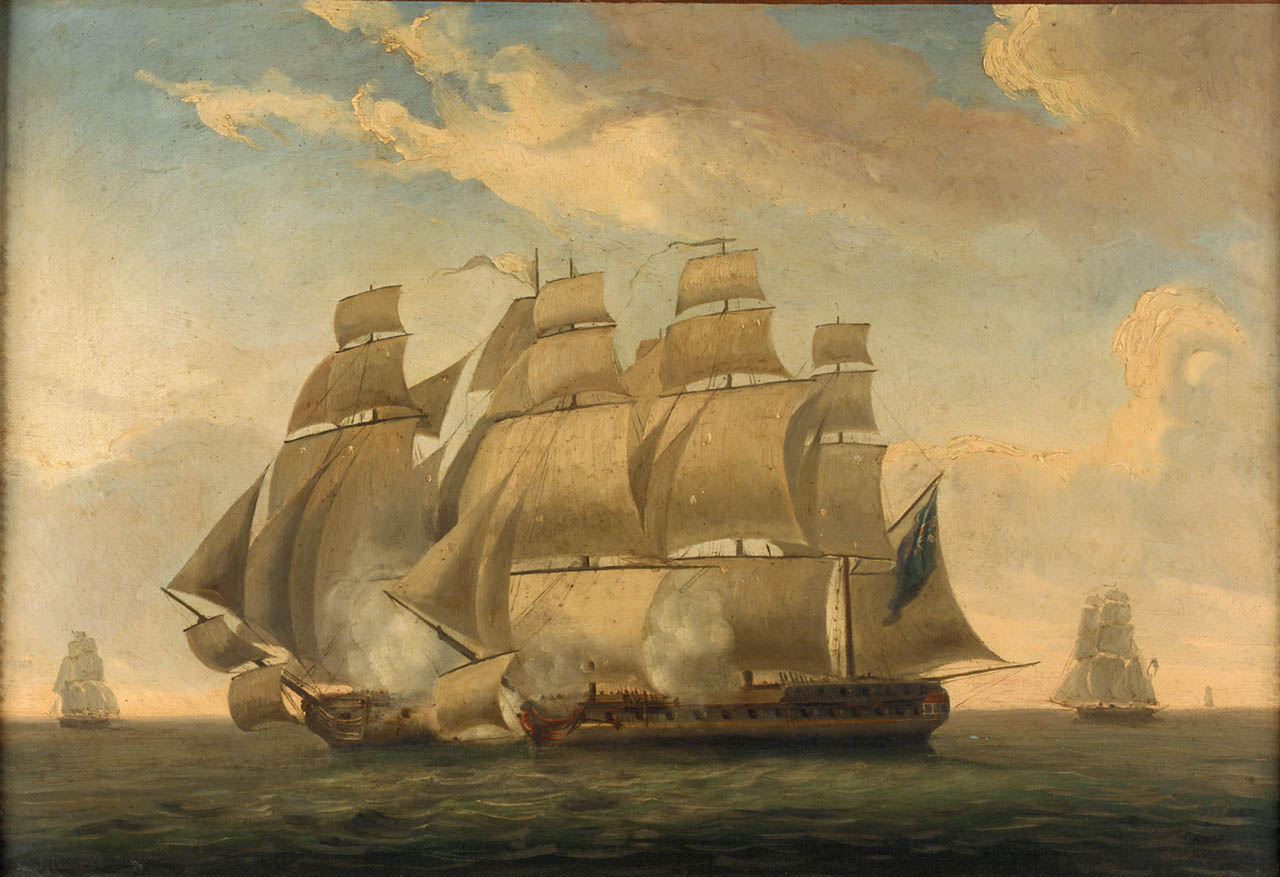
- Sibylle (left) at the action of 2 January 1783

Class overview
- Name: Sibylle
- Operators: French Navy; Royal Navy
- Planned: 5
- Completed: 5
- Lost: 3
- Retired: 2

General characteristics
- Displacement: 1,082 tonneaux
- Tons burthen: 600 port tonneaux
- Length: 43.9 metres
- Beam: 11.2 metres
- Draught: 5.4 metres
- Propulsion: Sail
- Complement: 260
- Armament: 32 guns: 26 × 12-pound long guns on upper deck; 6 × 8-pound long guns on quarterdeck and forecastle

The Sibylle class was a class of five 32-gun sail frigates designed by Jacques-Noël Sané and built for the French Navy in the late 1770s. They carried 26 × 12-pounder guns on the upper deck and 6 × 8-pounder guns on the forecastle and quarterdeck.

- Sibylle

Builder: Brest
Begun: April 1777
Launched: 1 September 1777
Fate: Captured by the Royal Navy in the action of 22 January 1783, broken up in 1784

- Néréide

Builder: Saint Malo
Begun: October 1778
Launched: 31 May 1779
Fate: Captured by the Royal Navy in December 1797, becoming HMS Nereide; retaken by the French Navy at the Battle of Grand Port in August 1810, but destroyed during the British invasion of Isle de France in December 1810.

- Fine

Builder: Nantes
Begun: October 1778
Launched: 11 August 1779
Fate: Wrecked in Chesapeake Bay in November 1793.

- Diane

Builder: Saint Malo
Begun: March 1778
Launched: 18 January 1779
Fate: Lost in a tempest on 17 March 1780 off St Lucia

- Émeraude

Builder: Nantes
Begun: December 1778
Launched: 25 October 1779
Fate: Broken up in 1797.
