= Action of 2 January 1783 =

1783 battle of the American Revolutionary War

- Part of the American Revolutionary War
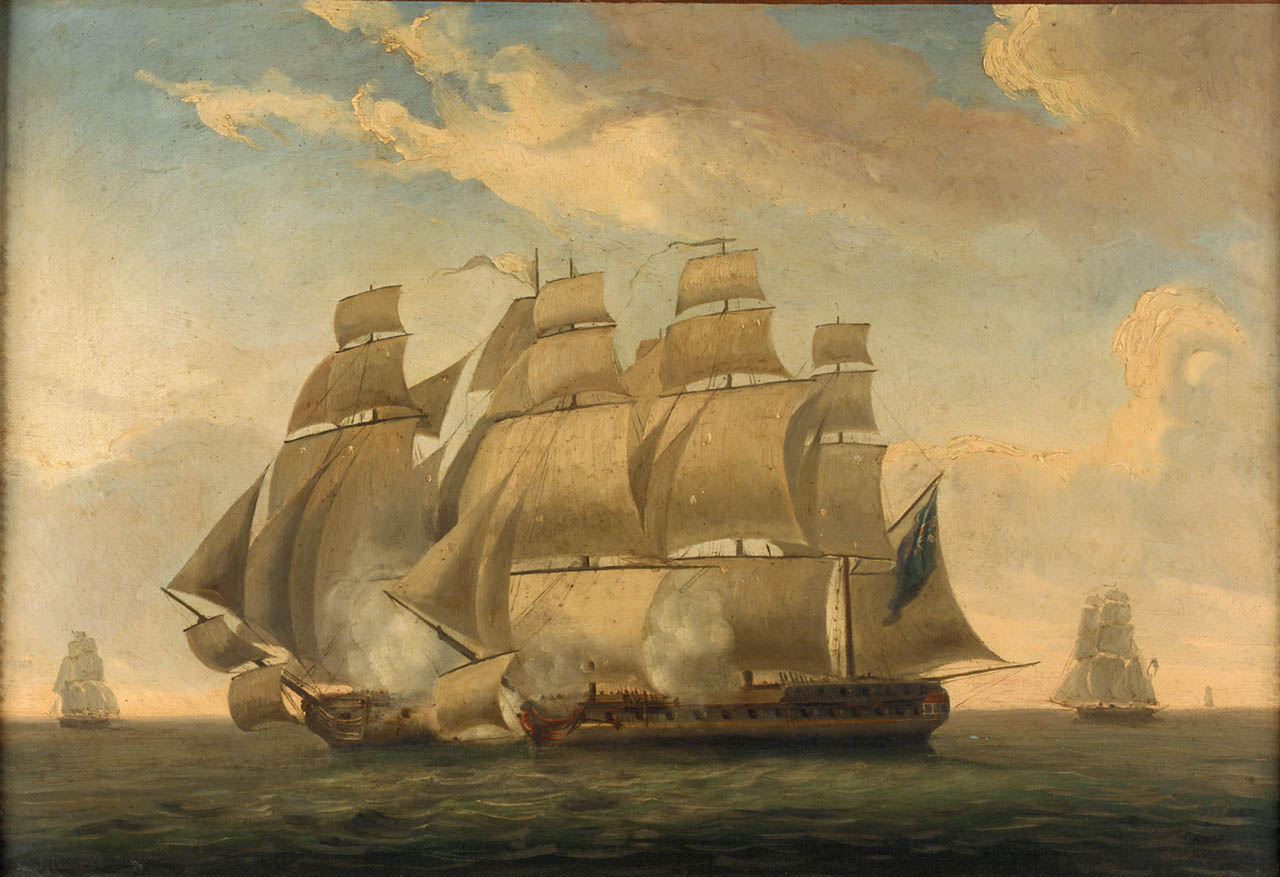
- Start of the action between HMS Magicienne and La Sibylle, 2 January 1783; Robert Dodd, 1784
Date	2 January 1783
Location	Off Cap-François, Caribbean Sea
Result	Inconclusive

Belligerents
Great Britain	France

Commanders and leaders
Thomas Graves	Kergariou-Locmaria

Strength
1 frigate	1 frigate 1 sloop

Casualties and losses
16 killed 31 wounded	14 killed 42 wounded

The action of 2 January 1783 was a minor naval battle that took place in the Caribbean Sea during the last stages of the American War of Independence. Severe fighting between a Royal Navy frigate HMS Magicienne and a French frigate Sibylle went on for nearly two hours, but in that time both frigates were reduced to wrecks.

== Events ==
=== Background ===
Captain Thomas Graves was in command of HMS Magicienne and was part of the British blockade off Cap-François, Saint-Domingue by the Royal Naval Jamaica station.

Off Cap-François into the open sea, a French convoy was sighted by HMS Endymion. At 0630 the Endymion made a signal that the convoy was French. The French convoy had sailed from Cap-François on 27 December 1782 carrying goods and money to Chesapeake Bay. A ship of the convoy had strayed and steered toward the British ship. At 0900 the Endymion came up with her and captured what turned out to be the Celerity, a rich prize valued at 20,000 Francs. Meanwhile, the Magicienne came up to assist in shifting the prisoners and goods. At 0930 Endymion signalled Magicienne to chase to the northeast. Théobald René de Kergariou-Locmaria decided to steer toward the British in order to draw them away from the convoy and signalled the convoy to continue on its course.

=== Action ===
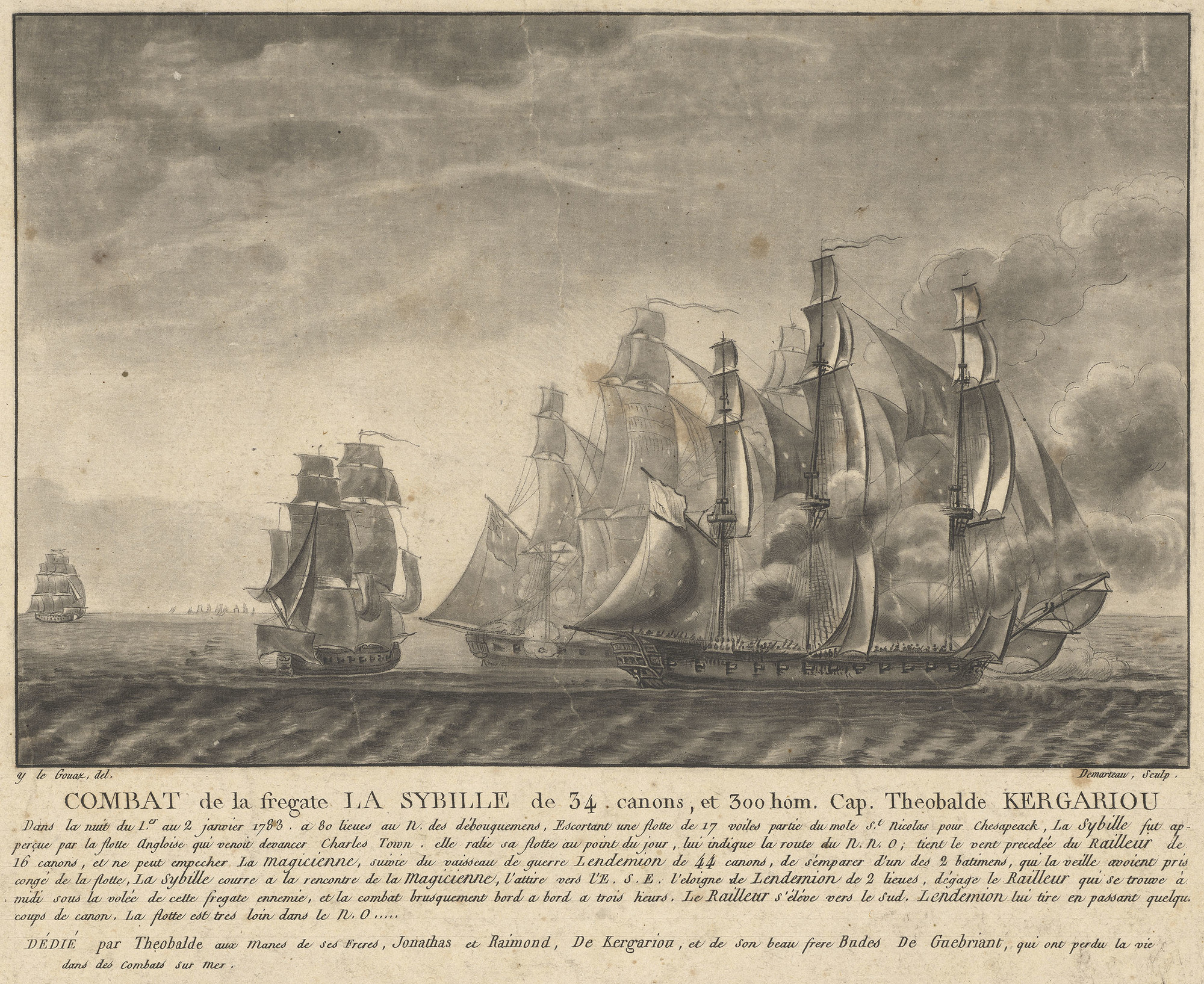
A French view of the action

Graves then set about clearing his ship for action. Shortly after, the three leewardmost of the French vessels bore away and followed the French convoy. The French warships raised their colours and prepared to give battle.

At 1230 the Magicienne closed up with the smaller ship, the French sloop Railleur of 14 guns, and a short action took place. After having fired two broadsides into the sloop, the French frigate Sibylle dropped back to assist the struggling Railleur, and Magicienne moved away. Sibylle was rated at 600 tons and mounted twenty-six 12-pounders and six 6-pounders. She had been coppered and was a fast-sailing frigate. She had a crew of 271 men under Kergariou. (Note: Sibylle was a member of a five-ship class of 32-gun frigates designed by Sané.) Magicienne sailed on and soon got on the port quarter of the Sybille. The guns were practically muzzle to muzzle as men hurled shot by the hand and frequently at each other through the port holes with half pikes and gun rammers to distract each other from firing.

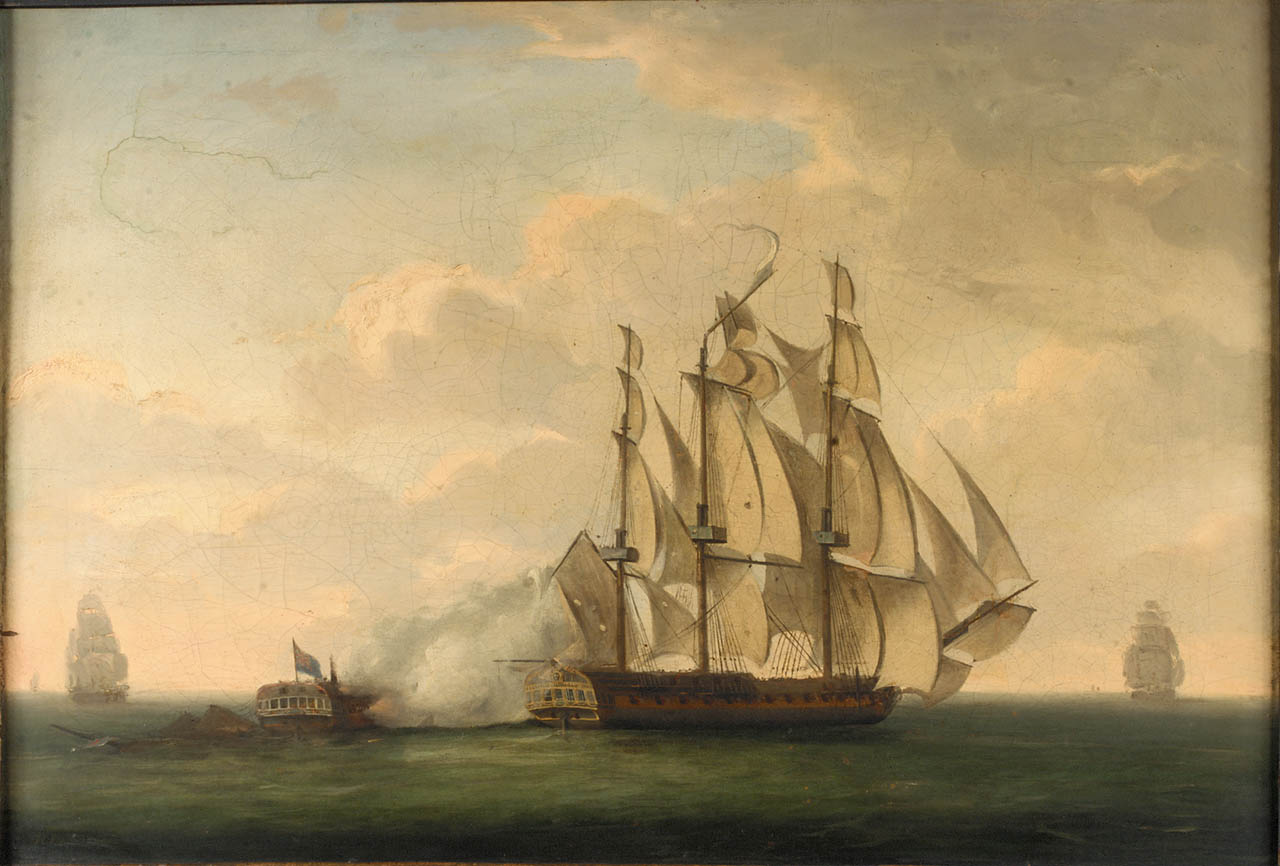
HMS Magicienne (left) lays dismasted after battling Sybille.

At 1415 the Magicienne had nearly silenced the Sybille’s fire and the British began to hope and expect that the French would soon surrender. Then, a French shot brought down Magicienne’s mizzen and fore-topmast. The wreck fell clear of the Sybille and she fell astern. Just after Magicienne’s masts fell, a broadside from the British ship cleared Sybille’s forecastle and killed eleven men. Kergariou was struck down on the quarterdeck and his men thought he was dead for some time but he was only wounded. Lieutenant de vaisseau Charles Gabriel Morel d'Escures, the second in command, continued the action.

About 1420 the Magicienne’s fore and main masts went overboard. Sybille now made off as Endymion and Emerald were seen to approach. Magicienne was unable to do anything except fire every available gun into her stern. The action had lasted for an hour and forty-five minutes.

=== Aftermath ===
The Magicienne was towed by Endymion and Emerald and went to Jamaica a fortnight later. The only prize, the Celerity, never made port and was lost on a rock on 9 January off the island of Heneaga. The Sybille had been severely damaged and was captured on 22 January 1783 by HMS Hussar under Thomas McNamara Russell. Thomas Graves later produced two engravings of the battle, one representing its beginning, and the other its end.
