= Admiral Graves =

Admiral Graves may refer to:

- Samuel Graves (1713–1787), fleet commander in America from 1774
- Thomas Graves, 1st Baron Graves (1725–1802), fleet commander in America from 1781, and in command during the Napoleonic Wars
- Thomas Graves (Royal Navy officer, died 1814) (c. 1747–1814), admiral after service in the Seven Years' War
