= Action of 22 January 1783 =

- Part of the American Revolutionary War
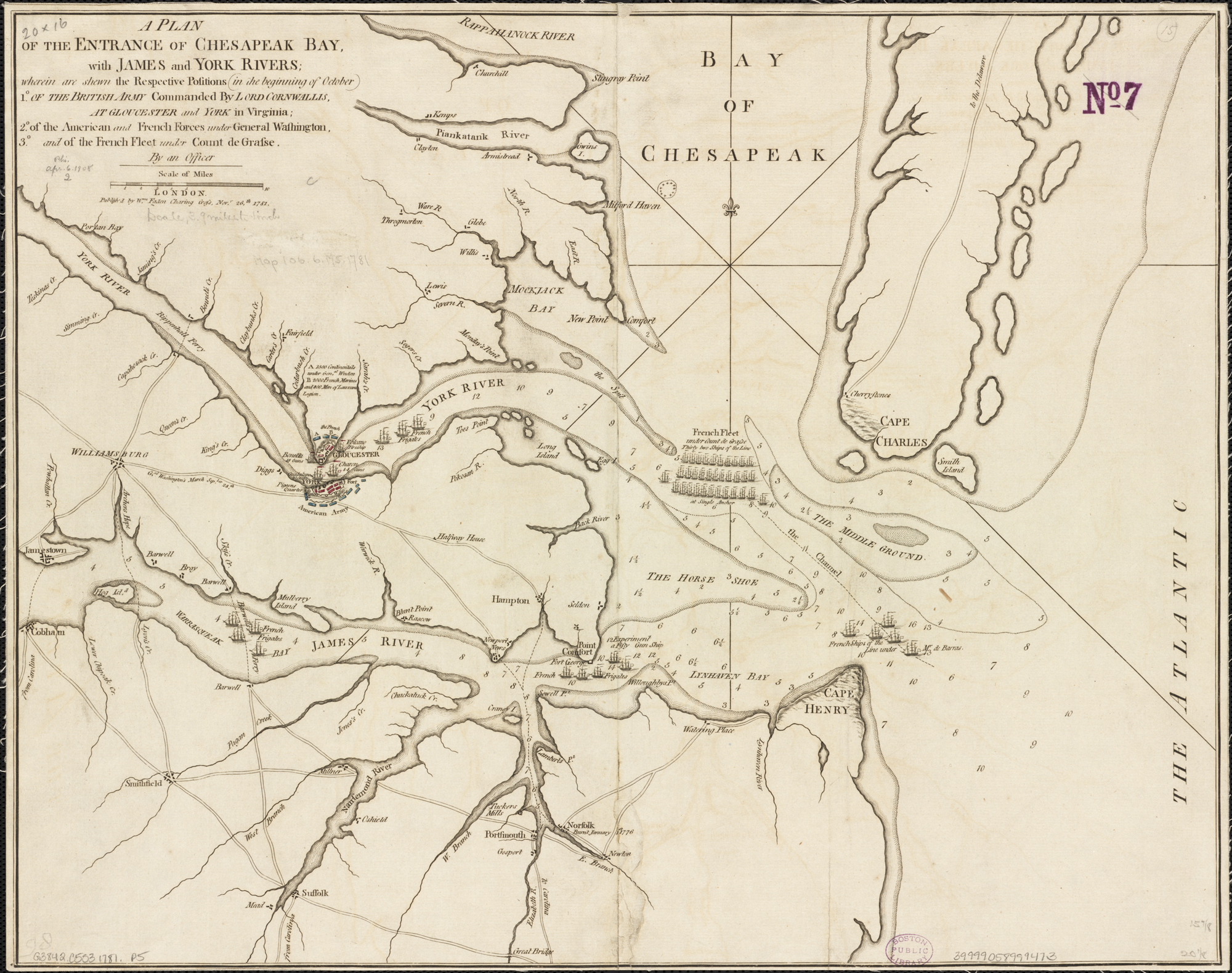
- 1781 map of the Virginia Capes
Date	22 January 1783
Location	Off the Virginia Capes, Atlantic Ocean 37°5′24.86″N 76°9′26.02″W
Result	British victory

Belligerents
Great Britain	France

Commanders and leaders
Thomas Russell	Kergariou-Locmaria (surrendered)

Strength
1 ship of the line 1 frigate	1 frigate

Casualties and losses
15 killed 26 wounded	26 killed 40 wounded 170 captured 1 frigate captured

The action of 22 January 1783 was a single-ship action fought off the Chesapeake Bay during the American War of Independence. The British frigate Hussar, under the command of Thomas Macnamara Russell, captured the French frigate Sybille, under the command of Théobald René de Kergariou-Locmaria. The circumstances of the battle included controversial French violations of accepted rules of war regarding the flying of false flags and distress signals.

== Background ==
Sybille, a relatively new French frigate, was commanded by Captain Théobald René de Kergariou-Locmaria. Sybille had three weeks previously engaged the 32-gun British frigate HMS Magicienne, under Captain Thomas Graves. The ships had fought until they had both been dismasted and were forced to disengage. Sybille made for a French port under a jury rig and was then caught in a violent storm. Due to this unfortunate series of events, Kergariou had been obliged to throw twelve of his guns overboard.

== Action ==
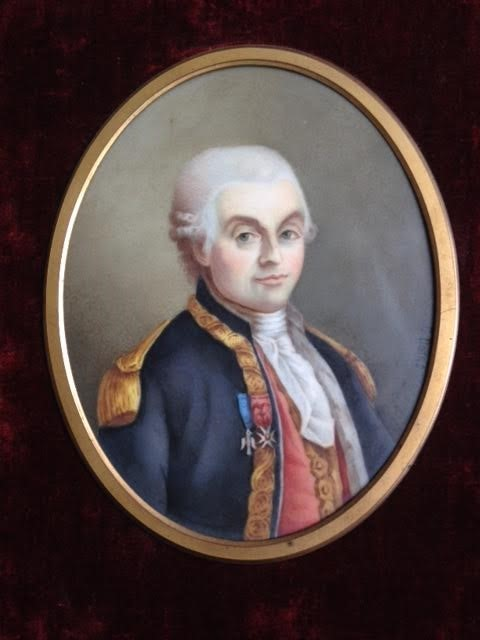
Portrait of Kergariou

On 22 January 1783, Hussar, under the command of Thomas Macnamara Russell, sighted Sybille. When she sighted Hussar, Kergariou ordered British colours hoisted over the French, the recognised signal of a prize, and at the same time, in the shrouds, a British yachting flag, union downwards, the internationally recognised signal of distress. Accordingly, Russell bore down to her assistance, but as the two ships drew near, Russell became suspicious and bore away. Seeing this, to prevent Hussar from warning the rest of the British forces of his presence, Kergariou lowered the British flag and fired his broadside; he also attempted to lower the yachting ensign, but this got stuck in the rigging and could not be removed.

Sybille's fire caused some damage to Hussar, but not as much as could have been done had Russell not turned away. Kergariou then attempted to board and overwhelm Hussar whilst still flying the stuck distress flag. Hussar's crew managed to repel the boarding party. At some point, a broadside from Hussar penetrated Sybille under the waterline, causing her to leak gravely, which flooded her gunpowder reserve. Sybille's pumps proved unable to compensate for the intake of seawater, and Kergariou ordered twelve guns thrown overboard. (Note: Sybille had already thrown twelve guns overboard a few days before during a gale.) Soon, Hussar returned with the 50-gun HMS Centurion and the 16-gun sloop HMS Terrier. Unable to defend herself, Sybille surrendered to Centurion, after Centurion's second broadside.

=== Controversy ===
The rules of war that were accepted at the time were that a ship might fly a country's flag other than its own to escape or lure an enemy, but that before the engagement commenced it must remove the decoy flag and replace it with its own. Alongside this, ships were expected to only fly a distress flag if they were actually in distress. Luring enemies into a trap using a distress flag was an unacceptable ruse de guerre. The French captain, therefore, would have broken two of the fundamental rules of sea warfare. Kergariou came aboard Hussar to surrender his sword. The count handed Russell his sword and complimented the captain and his crew on the capture of his vessel. Russell took the sword and reportedly said:

"Sir, I must humbly beg leave to decline any compliments to this ship, her officers, or company, as I cannot return them. She is indeed no more than a British ship of her class should be. She had not fair play; but Almighty God has saved her from the most foul snare of the most perfidious enemy. – Had you, Sir, fought me fairly, I should, if I know my own heart, receive your sword with a tear of sympathy. From you, Sir, I receive it with inexpressible contempt. And now, Sir, you will please observe, that lest this sword shold ever defile the hand of any honest French or English officer, I here, in the most formal and public manner, break it."

Russell stuck the blade into the deck, broke it in half, and threw it to the deck. He then placed the count under close arrest. The crew of Hussar discovered £500 in valuables aboard Sybille, which the French officers claimed as personal property. Russell permitted them to keep their property even though it reduced the prize money he and his crew received.

Russell kept Kergariou and his officers under guard in the orlop, fed them basic food rations, and provided them no bedding. Later, Admiral Digby received Kergariou with courtesy.

== Aftermath ==
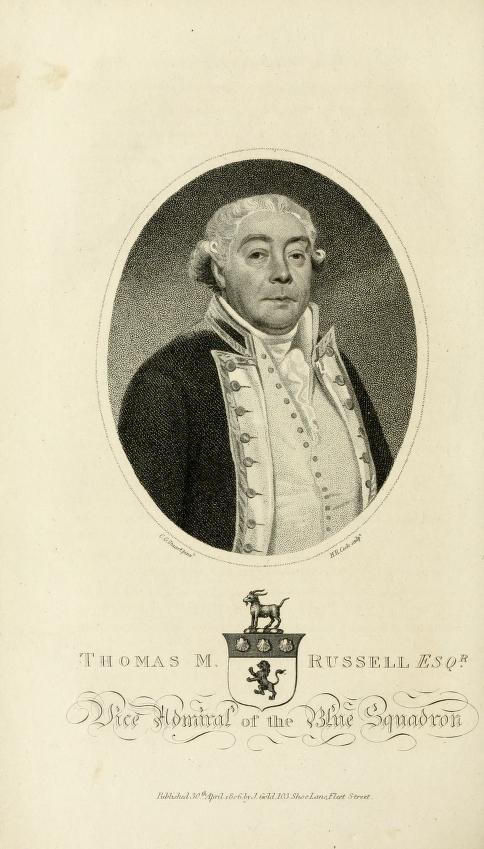
1799 lithograph of Russell

When Russell brought the prize into New York City he reported the circumstance, and his officers swore an affidavit in support of their captain. The Treaty of Paris was then on the point of being concluded, and in consequence the Admiralty Board and British government thought the affair would cause undue scandal. The official account was kept from the general public and Russell's accounts of the affair were not published. Kergariou sent his subordinate, the Chevalier d'Escures to see Russell. The Frenchman attempted to threaten Russell with retaliation should he ever publish an account of the matter. When Kergariou was released, he said, Kergariou would use his influence at the French court to acquire another ship to hunt Russell down should that happen. When Russell failed to be moved, the count, again through his subordinate, issued a challenge to Russell to demand personal satisfaction. Russell considered the challenge and transmitted this answer for delivery to Kergariou: "Sir I have considered your challenge maturely...I will fight him, by land or by water, on foot or on horseback, in any part of this globe that he pleases. You will, I suppose, be his second; and I shall be attended by a friend worthy of your sword."

In the automatic court-martial for the loss of his ship, between April and September 1784, the allegations were brought to the attention of the court; Kergariou-Locmaria was honourably discharged of all accusations of wrongdoing.

On the declaration of peace, Hussar returned to England for decommissioning. Russell was offered a knighthood, but refused as his income would not have been enough to support the title. Russell was informed that Kergariou had been tried and acquitted of the loss of his ship and the alleged breach of internationally recognised laws. In pursuit of satisfaction, he applied to the Admiralty for permission to travel to France. Admiral Mariot Arbuthnot accompanied him to France, unaware at first of the reason. Kergariou wrote to Russell and expressed his gratitude for the treatment that he and his crew had received after their capture, informing Russell that he intended to move to the Pyrenees, although he did not give a specific location. Arbuthnot convinced Russell that he should not attempt to follow Kergariou and so they returned to England.

Kergariou himself moved to England five years later at the outbreak of the French Revolution; in 1795, he was part of a Royalist band supported by the British government and took part in the attempted Invasion of France in 1795. At the Battle of Quiberon, Hoche's troops captured him; the Revolutionaries sentenced him to death and shot him.

=== References ===
Notes

Citations

Bibliography

- J. K. Laughton: 1897
- Levot, Prosper (1852). Biographie bretonne: recueil de notices sur tous les Bretons qui se sont fait un nom (in French). Vol. 2. Caudran.
- Levot, Prosper (1866). Les gloires maritimes de la France: notices biographiques sur les plus célèbres marins (in French). Bertrand.
- Troude, Onésime-Joachim (1867). Batailles navales de la France (in French). Vol. 2. Challamel ainé.

This article incorporates text from a publication now in the public domain: "Russell, Thomas Macnamara". Dictionary of National Biography. London: Smith, Elder & Co. 1885–1900.
