= Thomas Graves (Royal Navy officer, died 1814) =

Royal Navy officer (1747–1814)

Admiral Sir Thomas Graves KB
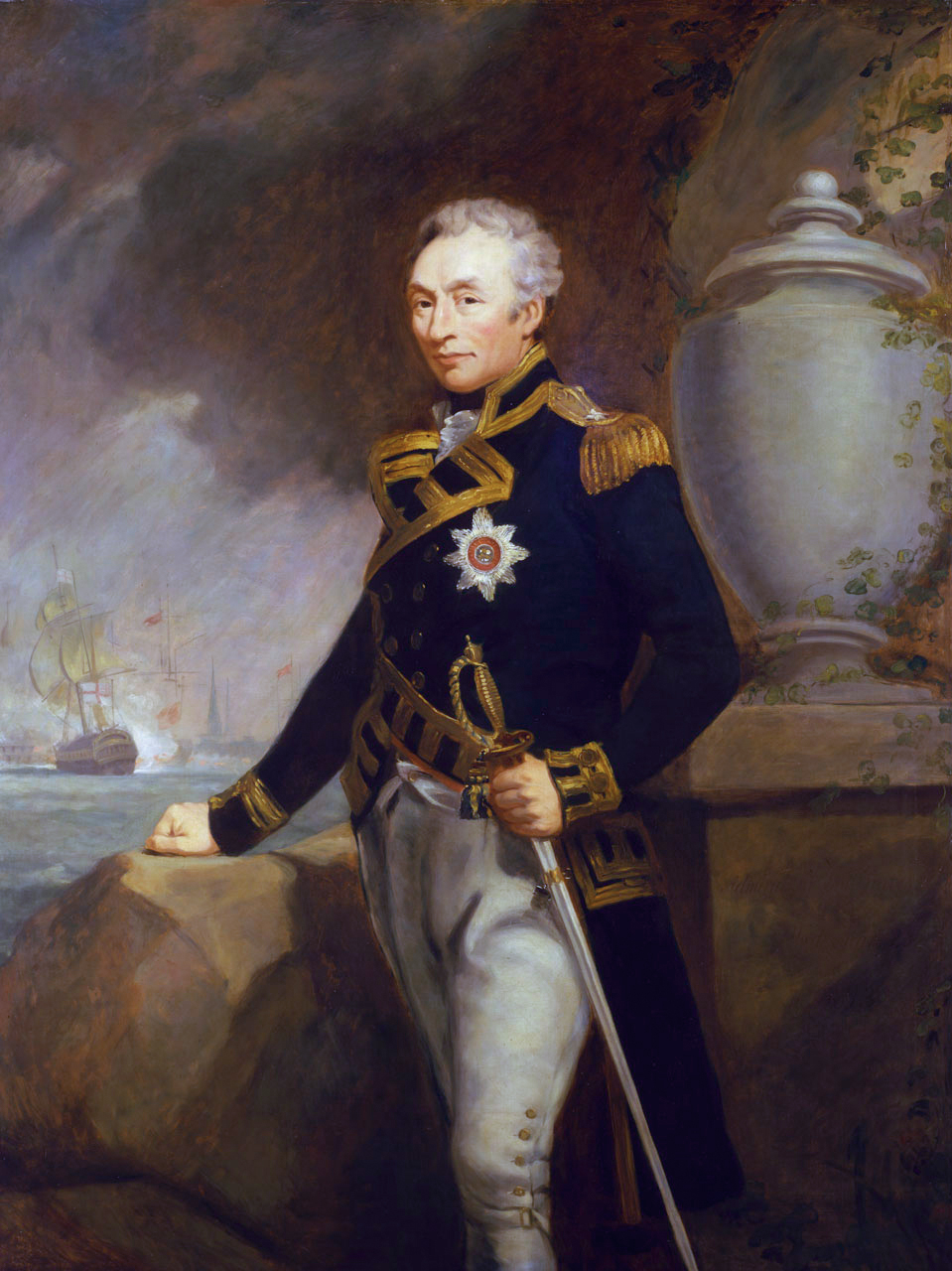
- Portrait by James Northcote, 1801
- Born: c. 1747
- Died: 29 March, 1814 (aged 66–67); Woodbine Hill, Honiton, Devon
- Military career
- Allegiance: Great Britain; United Kingdom
- Branch: Royal Navy
- Service years: –1814
- Rank: Admiral
- Commands: HMS Diana; HMS Savage; HMS Bedford; HMS Magicienne; HMS Cumberland
- Conflicts: Seven Years' War; American War of Independence; Battle of the Chesapeake; Battle of Saint Kitts; Battle of the Saintes; French Revolutionary Wars; Battle of Copenhagen (1801); Napoleonic Wars
- Awards: Knight Commander of the Bath

Admiral Sir Thomas Graves KB (c. 1747 – 29 March 1814) was a Royal Navy officer who served in the Seven Years' War, American War of Independence and French Revolutionary and Napoleonic Wars.

== Early life ==
Thomas Graves was born c. 1747, the third son of Reverend John Graves of Castle Dawson, County Londonderry, by his wife Jane Hudson. He was a nephew of Admiral Samuel Graves and a first cousin once removed of Admiral Thomas, Lord Graves. Graves' three brothers all served as captains in the navy, becoming admirals on the superannuated list. Thomas entered the navy at a very early age, and served during the Seven Years' War with his uncle Samuel on board HMS Scorpion, Duke, and Venus. After the peace he was appointed to HMS Antelope with his cousin Thomas, whom he followed to HMS Edgar, and by whom, in 1765, while on the coast of Africa, he was promoted to be lieutenant of HMS Shannon. It is stated in Foster's Peerage that he was born in 1752, a date incompatible with the facts of his known service: by the Regulations of the Navy he was bound to be twenty years old at the date of his promotion, and though the order was often grossly infringed, it is highly improbable that he was only thirteen: it may fairly be assumed that he was at least eighteen in 1765.

== Arctic seas and North America ==
In 1770 Graves was lieutenant of HMS Arethusa, and in 1773 was appointed to HMS Racehorse with Captain Constantine Phipps for the voyage of discovery in the Arctic Seas. In the following year he went out to North America with his uncle Samuel, and was appointed by him to command HMS Diana, one of the small schooners employed for the prevention of smuggling. She had thirty men, with an armament of four 2-pounder guns, and on 27 May 1775, being sent from Boston into the Charles River, was attacked by a large force of insurgents, whose numbers swelled till they reached a total approaching a thousand men, with two field-pieces. It fell calm, and towards midnight, as the tide ebbed, Diana ran aground, and lay over on her side, when the colonial forces succeeded in setting her on fire, and the small crew were compelled to abandon her, Graves having been first severely burnt, as well as his brother John, then a lieutenant of the flagship HMS Preston, who had been sent in one of the Preston's boats to support Diana.

== Promotion and further service ==
After this Graves continued to be employed in command of other tenders in the neighbourhood of Boston and Rhode Island until, on the recall of his uncle, he rejoined Preston and returned to England; but was again sent out to the North American station in the same ship, commanded by Commodore William Hotham. In 1779 he was promoted to the command of the 16-gun sloop-of-war HMS Savage on the West Indian and North American stations.

In early 1781, Graves was given command of a small flotilla comprising several warships and Loyalist privateers by Major-general William Phillips, who ordered Graves to proceed up the Potomac River and prevent 1,200 Continental Army light infantrymen under the Marquis de Lafayette from crossing it. Phillips also gave the flotilla permission to raid Patriot-owned property on the Virginia and Maryland shorelines, which it did. On 13 April, Graves' flotilla burned a Maryland plantation before turning its attention to Mount Vernon, George Washington's Virginia plantation, on the next day. Graves informed Mount Vernon's steward, Lund Washington, that he would burn the plantation if Lund did not supply Savage with provisions. Lund eventually agreed in part to recover 17 of Washington's slaves who fled to the sloop-of-war seeking freedom. The slaves were not returned, but Savage set sail without burning Mount Vernon.

On May 1781 Graves was promoted to post-captain and in the temporary absence of Commodore Edmund Affleck he commanded HMS Bedford at the Battle of the Chesapeake on 5 September, and continuing afterwards in Bedford, as Affleck's flag captain, was present in the Battle of Saint Kitts on 26 January 1782, and in the Battle of the Saintes on 9 April. In the following autumn Graves was appointed to the frigate HMS Magicienne, in which, on 2 January 1783, he fought an action with the French Sibylle, which was encumbered with a second ship's company which she was carrying to the Chesapeake. Both frigates were reduced to a wreck, and so parted; Magicienne to get to Jamaica a fortnight later; Sybille to be captured on 22 January 1783 by Hussar under Thomas McNamara Russell.

== Years of peace and the French Revolutionary Wars ==
During the peace Graves spent much of his time in France, and in the early years of the French Revolutionary Wars had no employment. It was not until October 1800 that he was appointed to command the 74-gun HMS Cumberland, in the Channel Fleet, under the orders of Lord St. Vincent. This was only for a few months; for on 1 January 1801 he was promoted to be Rear-Admiral of the White Squadron, and in March hoisted his flag on board the 64-gun HMS Polyphemus, one of the fleet proceeding to the Baltic with Sir Hyde Parker.

== Flag rank and later life ==
Graves afterwards shifted his flag to HMS Defiance, and in her was third in command under Parker and Nelson at the Battle of Copenhagen on 2 April 1801. For his services on this important occasion he received the thanks of Parliament, and an appointment as Knight Commander of the Bath. Towards the end of July the fleet left the Baltic, and on its return to England Graves, who had been in bad health during the greater part of the campaign, retired from active service. HMS Foudroyant, captained for a time by Christopher Nesham, carried his flag in the Bay of Biscay from October 1804 to February 1805. He became a vice-admiral on 9 November 1805 and admiral on 2 August 1812.

== Personal life ==
He was twice married, but had only one daughter. He died at his house, Woodbine Hill, near Honiton on 29 March 1814.
