= Huron (1793 ship) =

History

France
- Name: Huron
- Builder: Bordeaux, France
- Commissioned: 1793
- Captured: 20 January 1801

United Kingdom
- Name: Huron
- Acquired: 15 May 1801 by purchase of a prize
- Fate: Last listed 1808

General characteristics
- Tons burthen: 275, or 29140/94, or 300 (French; "of load") (bm)
- Length: 105 ft 4 1/2 in (32.1 m)
- Beam: 29 ft 6 in (9.0 m)
- Depth of hold: 13 ft 4 1/2 in (4.1 m)
- Complement: 121-189 (French privateer)
- Armament: 18–20 guns (French privateer)

Huron, of Bordeaux, was commissioned in 1793 as a privateer. She made several cruises before the British Royal Navy captured her in 1801 as she was returning to France with cargo from Mauritius. She was sold and then proceeded to sail between England and America as a merchantman. She was last listed in 1808.

== Career ==
She was under Captain Pierre Destebetcho in 1793 (dates not clear), Captain Harismedy circa late 1797-1798, Destebetcho (first name not clear) from July 1798 to 1799, and Captain Saint Guiron from 1799 in Bordeaux to May 1800 in Mauritius.

In January 1801, HMS Magicienne, with Doris in sight, captured in the Channel the French letter of marque Huron, which was returning from Mauritius with a highly valuable cargo of ivory, cochineal, indigo, tea, sugar, pepper, cinnamon, ebony, etc. Ogilvy described her as a "remarkable fine Ship, ſails well, is pierced for Twenty Guns, had Eighteen mounted, but threw them all overboard except Four during the Chace; I think her a Vessel well calculated for His Majesty's Service." The Navy ignored his recommendation.

She was offered for sale on 15 May 1801, as was her cargo. (Note: The cargo listing was extensive and included such items as 1352 bags of coffee, 415 pieces of black ebony, 134 pigs (ingots), three casks, and three bags of teutenage (a cupro-nickel alloy), tortoiseshell, and 368 elephants' teeth.)

Huron, of 275 tons (bm), a French prize, appeared in the 1802 volume of Lloyd's Register (LR).

| Year | Master | Owner | Trade | Source |
|---|---|---|---|---|
| 1802 | T.Cole | A.Gardner | London–America | LR |
| 1808 | T.Cole | A.Gardner | London–America | LR |

== Fate ==
Huron was last listed in LR in 1808.
