= Roebuck-class ship =

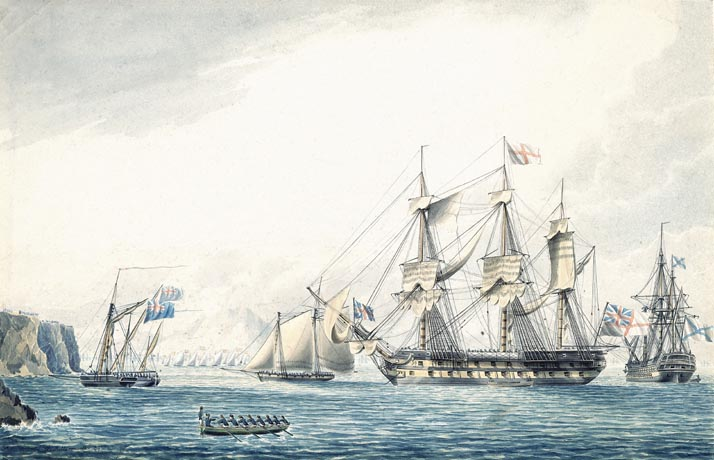
- Argo as flagship at Gibraltar in 1799

Class overview
- Name: Roebuck class
- Built: 1770-1784
- Completed: 20

General characteristics
- Type: Fifth-rate ship
- Tons burthen: 87926/94 (bm), (as designed)
- Length: 140 ft (43 m) (gundeck); 116 ft 4.375 in (35 m) (keel)
- Beam: 37 ft 9.5 in (12 m)
- Depth of hold: 16 ft 4 in (5 m)
- Sail plan: Full-rigged ship
- Complement: 280 (300 from 1783)
- Armament: Lower deck: 20 × 18-pounder guns; Upper deck: 22 × 9-pounder guns; (later upgraded to 12-pounder guns); QD: nil; Fc: 2 × 6-pounder guns

The Roebuck-class ship was a class of twenty 44-gun sailing two-decker warships of the Royal Navy. The class carried two complete decks of guns, a lower battery of 18-pounders and an upper battery of 9-pounders. This battery enabled the vessel to deliver a broadside of 285 pounds. Most were constructed for service during the American Revolutionary War but continued to serve thereafter. By 1793 five were still on the active list. Ten were hospital ships, troopships or storeships. As troopships or storeships they had the guns on their lower deck removed. Many of the vessels in the class survived to take part in the Napoleonic Wars. In all, maritime incidents claimed five ships in the class and war claimed three.

== Classification ==
The Royal Navy classed the Roebuck class as fifth rates like frigates but did not classify them as frigates. Although sea officers sometimes casually described them and other small two-deckers as frigates, the Admiralty officially never referred to them as frigates. By 1750, the Admiralty strictly defined frigates as ships of 28 guns or more, carrying all their main battery (24, 26 or even 28 guns) on the upper deck, with no guns or openings on the lower deck (which could thus be at sea level or even lower). A frigate might carry a few smaller guns - 3-pounders or 6-pounders, later 9-pounders - on their quarterdeck and (perhaps) on the forecastle. The Roebuck-class ships were two-deckers with complete batteries on both decks, and hence not frigates.

== Design and construction ==
The Admiralty assigned the contract for Roebuck to Chatham Dockyard on 30 November 1769. Some seven years after the design was first produced, the Admiralty re-used it for a second batch of nineteen ships. The Admiralty ordered them to meet the particular requirements of the American War of Independence for vessels suitable for coastal warfare in the shallow seas off North America (where deeper two-deckers could not sail). The first five vessels of the class, and the later Guardian, had two rows of stern lights (windows), like larger two-deckers, though actually there was just the single level of cabin behind. Most, if not all, of the other ships of the class - from Dolphin onwards - had a 'single level' frigate-type stern.

== Ships in class ==
PROTOTYPE

- Roebuck
  - Builder: Chatham Dockyard
  - Ordered: 30 November 1769
  - Laid down: October 1770
  - Launched: 24 April 1774
  - Completed: 4 August 1775
  - Fate: Broken up at Sheerness in July 1811.

WARTIME BATCH

- Romulus
  - Builder: Henry Adams, Bucklers Hard
  - Ordered: 14 May 1776
  - Laid down: July 1776
  - Launched: 17 December 1777
  - Completed: 7 April 1778 at Portsmouth Dockyard
  - Fate: Captured by a French squadron consisting of a ship of the line, two frigates and a cutter, off the Chesapeake 19 February 1781.
- Actaeon
  - Builder: Randall & Co, Rotherhithe
  - Ordered: 3 July 1776
  - Laid down: July 1776
  - Launched: 29 January 1778
  - Completed: 17 April 1778 at Deptford Dockyard
  - Fate: Sold to be broken up 30 April 1802
- Janus
  - Builder: Robert Batson, Limehouse
  - Ordered: 24 July 1776
  - Laid down: 9 August 1776
  - Launched: 14 May 1778
  - Completed: 11 August 1778 at Deptford Dockyard
  - Fate: Renamed Dromedary 1788 as storeship. Wrecked near Trinidad in August 1800 but with no loss of life.
- Charon (i)
  - Builder: John Barnard, Harwich
  - Ordered: 9 October 1776
  - Laid down: January 1777
  - Launched: 8 October 1778
  - Completed: 23 January 1779 at Sheerness Dockyard
  - Fate: She was trapped at the Siege of Yorktown so her stores, men and guns were taken ashore; on 10 October 1781 heated shot from a French battery set her on fire.
- Dolphin
  - Builder: Chatham Dockyard
  - Ordered: 8 January 1777
  - Laid down: 1 May 1777
  - Launched: 10 March 1781
  - Completed: 11 May 1781
  - Fate: Broken up in July 1817
- Ulysses
  - Builder: John Fisher, Liverpool
  - Ordered: 16 April 1777
  - Laid down: 28 June 1777
  - Launched: 14 July 1779
  - Completed: 2 January 1780 at Plymouth Dockyard
  - Fate: Sold to be broken up 11 January 1816
- Endymion
  - Builder: Edward Greaves, Limehouse
  - Ordered: 2 February 1778
  - Laid down: 18 March 1778
  - Launched: 28 August 1779
  - Completed: 5 November 1779 at Woolwich Dockyard
  - Fate: Wrecked on an uncharted rock off Turks Island on 20 August 1790 with the loss of one man.

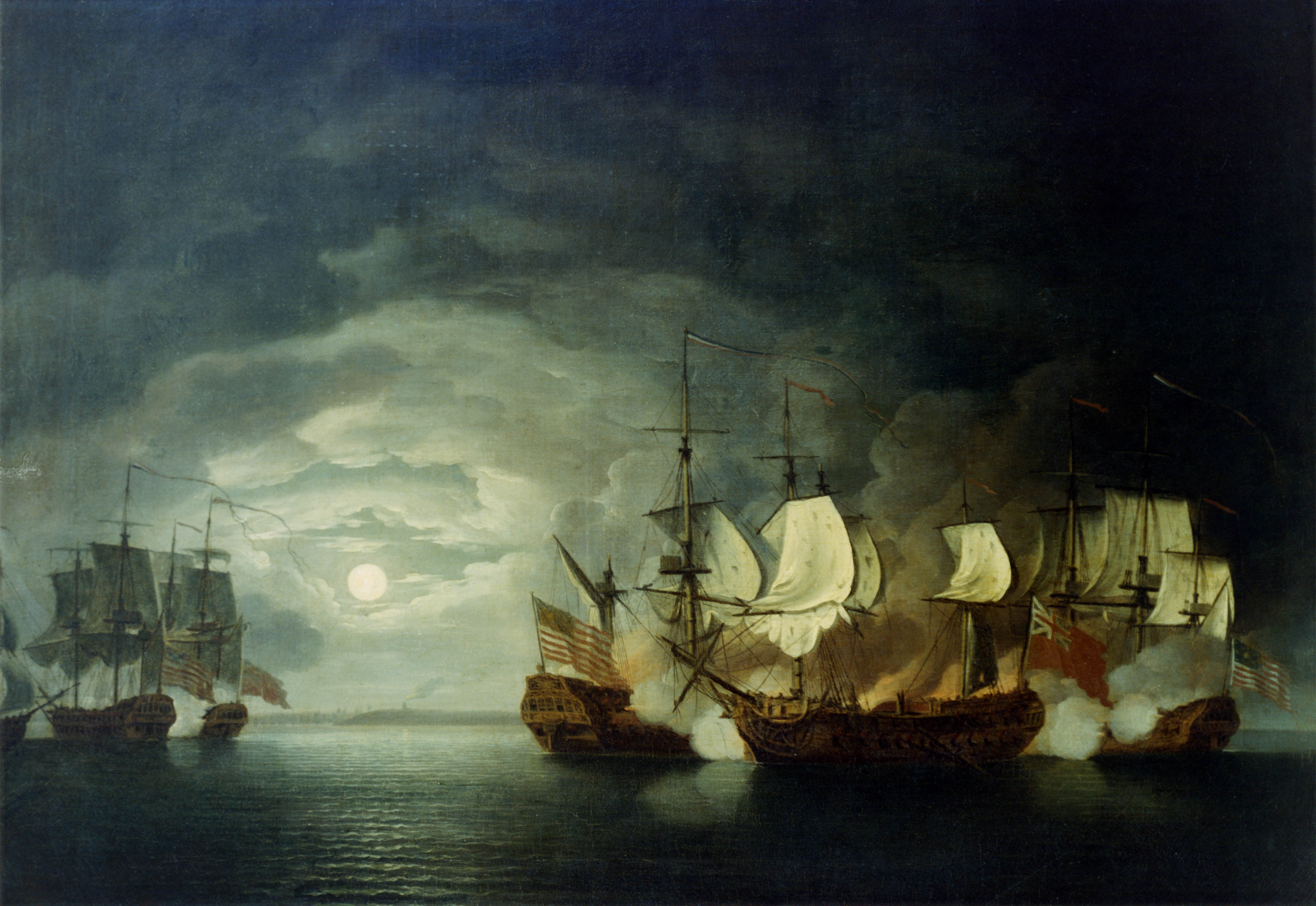
Battle between Continental Ship Bonhomme Richard and HMS Serapis, 23 September 1779 (Thomas Mitchell, 1780)

- Serapis (i)
  - Builder: Randall & Co, Rotherhithe
  - Ordered: 11 February 1778
  - Laid down: 3 March 1778
  - Launched: 4 March 1779
  - Completed: 6 May 1779 at Deptford Dockyard
  - Fate: Taken by American Bonhomme Richard, assisted by other vessels, and transferred to the French who employed her as a privateer; wrecked 1781 off Madagascar.
- Assurance
  - Builder: Randall & Co, Rotherhithe
  - Ordered: 20 May 1778
  - Laid down: 11 June 1778
  - Launched: 20 April 1780
  - Completed: 15 July 1780 at Deptford Dockyard
  - Fate: Broken up in March 1815
- Argo
  - Builder: John Baker & Co, Howden Pans, Newcastle
  - Ordered: 26 February 1779
  - Laid down: 18 August 1779
  - Launched: 8 June 1781
  - Completed: 15 October 1781 at Chatham Dockyard
  - Fate: Sold to be broken up 11 January 1816

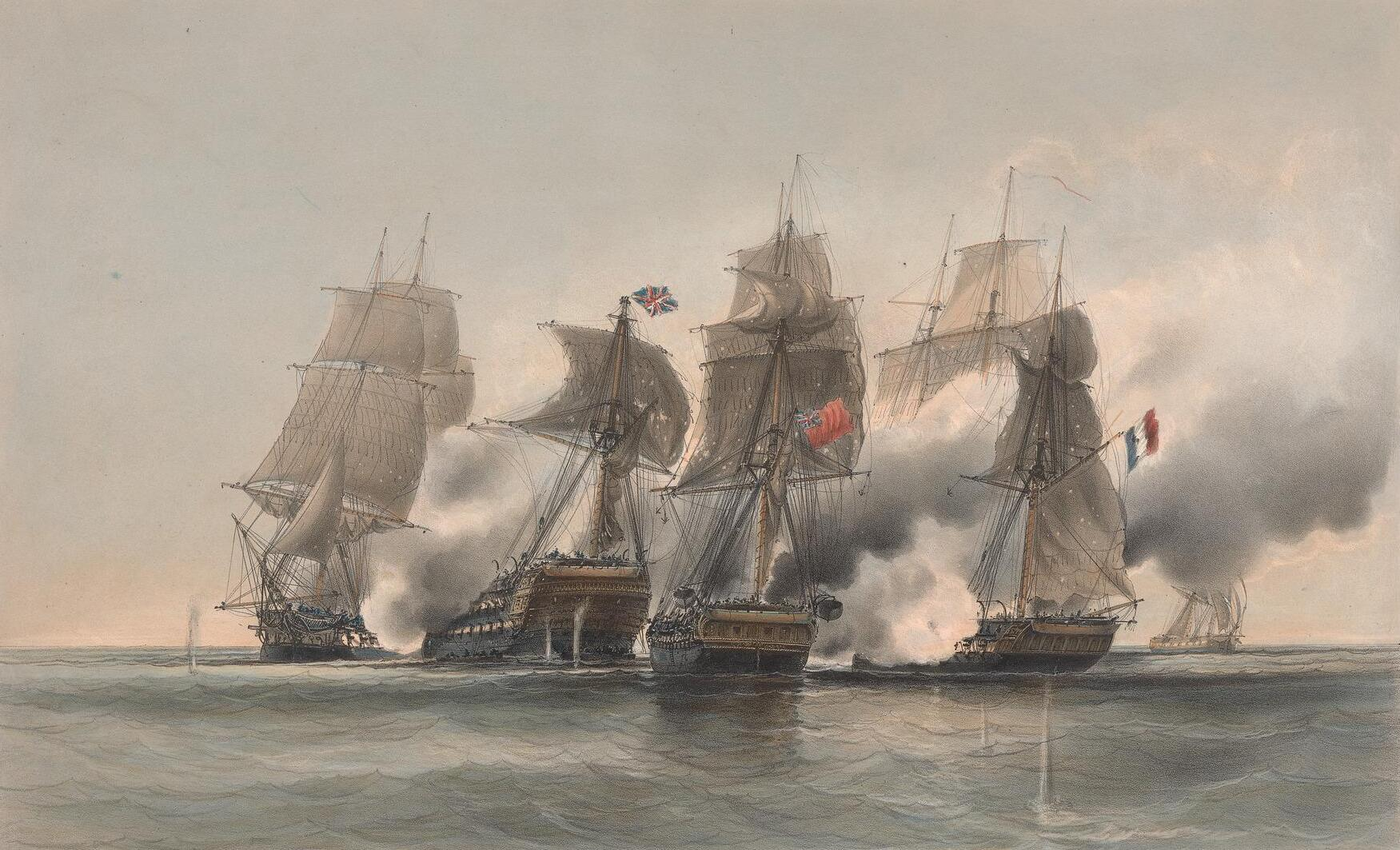
Cybèle and Prudente fighting Centurion and Diomede

- Diomede
  - Builder: James Martin Hilhouse, Bristol
  - Ordered: 14 August 1779
  - Laid down: March 1780
  - Launched: 18 October 1781
  - Completed: 14 March 1782 at Bristol
  - Fate: Wrecked off Trincomalee, 2 August 1795.
- Mediator
  - Builder: Thomas Raymond, Northam, Southampton
  - Ordered: 3 December 1779
  - Laid down: July 1780.
  - Launched: 30 March 1782
  - Completed: 15 June 1782 at Portsmouth Dockyard
  - Fate: Renamed Camel 1788 as storeship. Broken up in December 1810.
- Resistance
  - Builder: Edward Greaves, Limehouse
  - Ordered: 29 March 1780
  - Laid down: April 1781
  - Launched: 11 July 1782
  - Completed: 17 September 1782 at Deptford Dockyard
  - Fate: Blew up (believed struck by lightning) off Sumatra 24 July 1798; four survivors.
- Gladiator
  - Builder: Henry Adams, Bucklers Hard
  - Ordered: 13 July 1780
  - Laid down: April 1781
  - Launched: 20 January 1783
  - Completed: February 1783 at Portsmouth Dockyard
  - Fate: Broken up in August 1817
- Serapis (ii)
  - Builder: James Martin Hillhouse, Bristol
  - Ordered: 13 July 1780
  - Laid down: May 1781
  - Launched: 7 November 1782
  - Completed: December 1782 at Bristol
  - Fate: Sold to be broken up at Jamaica on 17 July 1826
- Experiment
  - Builder: Robert Fabian, East Cowes, Isle of Wight
  - Ordered: 13 July 1780
  - Laid down: June 1781
  - Launched: 27 November 1784
  - Completed: 11 January 1785 at Portsmouth Dockyard
  - Fate: Sold to be broken up 8 September 1836

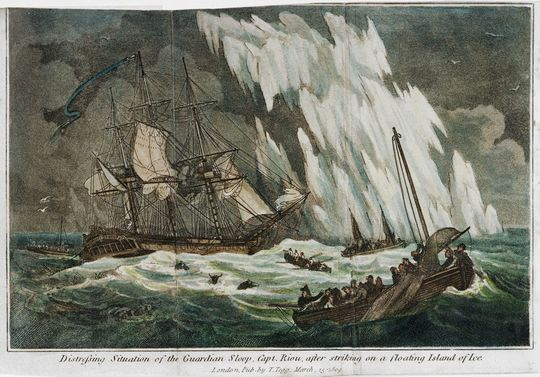
Guardian hitting an iceberg in 1789

- Guardian
  - Builder: Robert Batson, Limehouse
  - Ordered: 11 August 1780
  - Laid down: December 1780
  - Launched: 23 March 1784
  - Completed: 20 May 1784 at Deptford Dockyard
  - Fate: Collided with iceberg 24 December 1789 and of the 40 men and passengers who set out in boats, 10 survived; Guardian, with the remaining 61 crew, convicts and passengers, arrived at Cape Town in sinking condition 21 February 1790 and beached on 12 April during a gale; remains sold to be broken up 8 February 1791.
- Regulus
  - Builder: Thomas Raymond, Northam, Southampton
  - Ordered: 20 October 1780
  - Laid down: June 1781
  - Launched: 10 February 1785
  - Completed: 10 March 1785 at Portsmouth Dockyard
  - Fate: Broken up in March 1816
- Charon (ii)
  - Builder: James Martin Hillhouse, Bristol
  - Ordered: 19 September 1781
  - Laid down: May 1782
  - Launched: 17 May 1783
  - Completed: 5 February 1784 at Plymouth Dockyard
  - Fate: Broken up in December 1805
