= French frigate Sibylle (1777) =

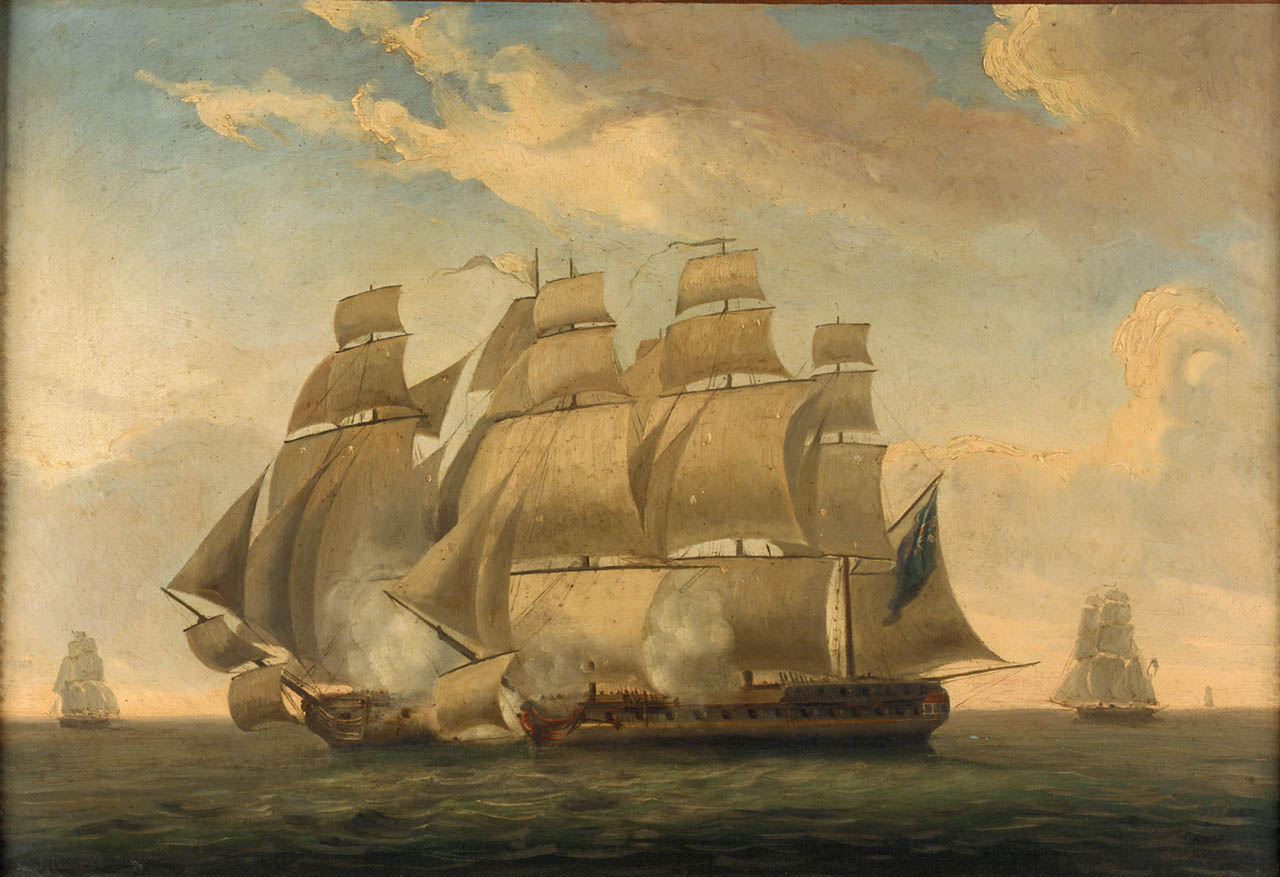
- Sibylle (left) at the action of 2 January 1783

History

France
- Name: Sibylle
- Builder: Brest. Plans by Jacques-Noël Sané
- Laid down: April 1777
- Launched: 1 September 1777
- Commissioned: November 1777
- Fate: Captured by the British Royal Navy in 1783 and broken up in 1784

General characteristics
- Class & type: Sybille-class
- Displacement: 1,082 tonneaux
- Tons burthen: 600 port tonneaux
- Length: 43.8 metres
- Beam: 11.2 metres
- Draught: 5.4 metres
- Propulsion: Sail
- Complement: 260
- Armament: Gun deck: 26 × 12-pounder guns; quarterdeck: 8 × 8-pounder guns

Sibylle was a 32-gun copper-hulled, frigate of the French Navy, lead ship of her class.

== Career ==
Sibylle took part in the Battle of Ushant on 27 July 1778, under Sébastien Mahé de Kerhouan. She was part of the division under Toussaint-Guillaume Picquet de la Motte that captured 18 British merchantmen in the action of 2 May 1781.

In 1783, Sibylle was under Captain Théobald René de Kergariou-Locmaria. On 2 January, she fought a hotly contested, and ultimately inconclusive action of 2 January 1783 against HMS Magicienne.

Sibylle effected repairs and returned to the sea, but ended up being captured by HMS Centurion and Hussar in the action of 22 January 1783.

== Fate ==
The British broke up Sibylle in 1784.
