= Protector (1779 frigate) =

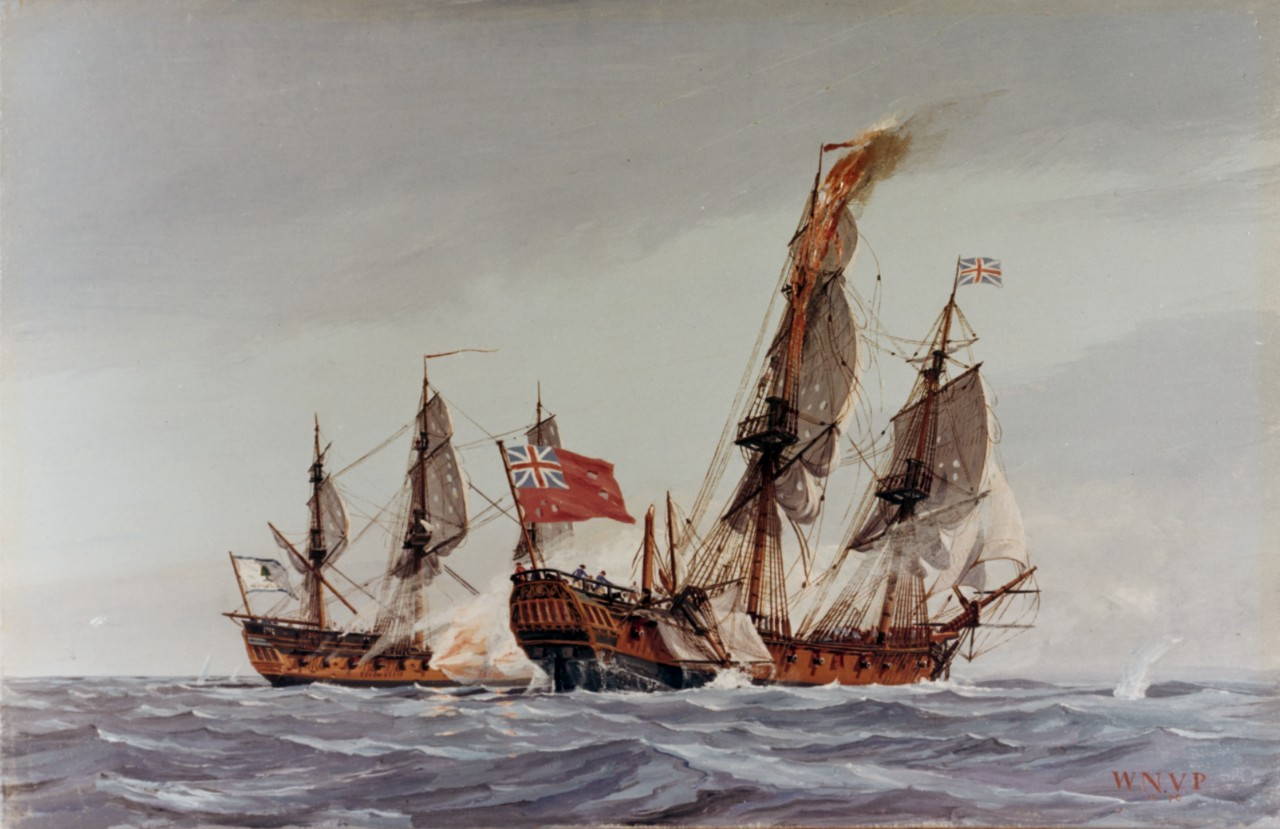
- Protector (left) engaging Admiral Duff on 9 June 1780

History

Massachusetts
- Name: Protector
- Launched: 1779, Newburyport, Massachusetts
- Captured: 5 May 1781

Great Britain
- Name: HMS Hussar
- Namesake: Hussar
- Acquired: 1781 by capture
- Fate: Sold 1783

Denmark
- Name: Hussaren
- Owner: Frédéric de Coninck (Note: Lloyd's Register gives her owner as the Danish East India Company (DEIC). However, Danish records distinguish between vessels the DEIC owned or operated, and those that non-DEIC companies and individuals owned and operated. The Danish records unambiguously show de Coninck as owner.)
- Acquired: 1783 by purchase
- Fate: Sold c. 1787

Great Britain
- Name: Hussar
- Acquired: 1787 by purchase
- Fate: No longer listed by 1790
- Notes: Lloyd's Register describes Hussar as a three-decker.

General characteristics
- Tons burthen: HMS Hussar:586 (bm); Hussar: 600 (bm); Hussaren: 200kmcl (Note: kmcl stands for kommercelæsten, which represents a volumetric measure of capacity, much like burthen.)
- Sail plan: Ship
- Complement: Protector: 200; Hussaren:58
- Armament: Protector:20–28 guns; HMS Hussar: Upper deck:16 × 9-pounder guns; QD:4 × 6-pounder guns

Protector was a 28-gun frigate of the Massachusetts State Navy launched in 1779. She fought a single-ship action against the British privateer Admiral Duff before the Royal Navy captured her in 1781. The British navy took her into service as the sixth-rate post ship HMS Hussar. Hussar too engaged in a notable action against the French 32-gun frigate Sybille. The Royal Navy sold Hussar in 1783, and a Dutch ship-owner operating from Copenhagen purchased her. She made one voyage to the East Indies for him before he sold her to British owners circa 1786. She leaves Lloyd's Register by 1790.

== Career ==
=== Massachusetts Navy ===
Captain John Foster Williams received command of the new 20 or 28-gun frigate Protector in the spring of 1780, and took her to sea in June. In accordance with instructions from the Board of War, the new warship cruised in the vicinity of the Newfoundland Banks, on the lookout for British merchantmen. Her vigilance was rewarded early in June.

At 0700 on 9 June 1780, Protector spotted a strange ship bearing down on her, flying British colors. At 1100, Protector, also flying British colors, hailed the stranger and found her to be the 32-gun British privateer Admiral Duff, bound for London from Saint Kitts. When the ship's identity had been ascertained, Protector hauled down British colors and ran up the Continental flag—opening fire almost simultaneously. The action ensued for the next hour and one-half, until Admiral Duff caught fire and exploded, leaving 55 survivors for Protector to rescue soon thereafter.

In May 1781, Lloyd's List reported that the rebel frigates Deane and Protector had captured John, Ashburner, master, from Lancaster to St. Kitts, and a ship sailing from Glasgow to Jamaica with 900 barrels of beef and a quantity of dry goods, and had taken them into Martinique.

In June, Lloyd's List reported that the American privateer Protector, of 28 guns and 179 men, had captured Sally, Townsend, master, which had been sailing from St Kitts to New York.

Notification of these captures took some months to get to Britain. In the meantime, on 5 May 1781, HMS Roebuck and HMS Medea captured Protector off Sandy Hook, New Jersey. The Royal Navy took her into service as the sixth-rate HMS Hussar.

=== Royal Navy ===
The Royal Navy commissioned Hussar under Captain Thomas Macnamara Russell.

On 3 May 1782, Hussar captured the brig Boston Packet, which was carrying flour and rum.

Hussar's most famous engagement was the action with the French frigate Sybille.

In the action Hussar emerged victorious, having lost only two men killed and five or six wounded. However, the actions of the French captain gave rise to controversy.

Hussar arrived at Deptford on 3 June 1783, and was paid off. The Royal Navy sold Hussar on 14 August 1783, for £1540, at Deptford.

=== Danish ownership ===
Frédéric de Coninck, who was a Dutch trader with a fleet of 64 ships operating from Copenhagen, purchased her. At purchase, the ship was already fitted with a desalination plant which was ideal for the long voyages envisaged to the East Indies and the Danes made contemporary technical drawings of the distilling machine. (Note: This technical drawing can be accessed on line via this link then click Hussaren and then Vis)

Her captain was A. M'Intosh (or Mackingtosh, or MacIntosh), and her trade was initially London-Copenhagen. In 1784-5, she sailed to Bengal and back to Denmark. When she sailed up the Hooghly to Calcutta the British East India Company suspected that she was American, even though she was flying Danish colours. M'Intosh himself died in late 1785, as there is a call in the London Gazette of 3 January 1786, for claimants against his estate.

Danish records show Hussaren as making only one voyage for De Connick. (Note: Lloyd's Register for 1786, still shows M'Intosh as master, and her trade as London-East Indies. However, Lloyd's Register was only as accurate as shipowners bothered to keep it by informing Lloyd's. Stale information is common.)

=== British ownership ===
Lloyd's Register for 1787, shows a new master, R. Wilson, a new owner, and a new trade, Honduras-Bristol.

Lloyd's Register did not publish in 1788, and the relevant pages are missing from the volume for 1789. Hussar is not listed in the volume for 1790.
