= Charles Gabriel Morel d'Escures =

French navigator and explorer (1751–1786)

Charles Gabriel Morel d'Escures (3 January 1751, Alençon – 13 July 1786, Baie des Français, Lituya, Alaska) was a French navigator and explorer and a member of the La Pérouse expedition (1 August 1785 to 13 July 1786) and of the Académie de Marine.

== Life ==
Training at the Ecole royale de Marine (1773–1775), he fought in several campaigns from 1776 to 1783 and held his last command on the la Dorade (decommissioned in 1783).

Lieutenant de vaisseau from 14 April 1781, he received the ordre de Saint-Louis on 1 June 1783. On 13 May 1785, the comte d'Hector chose Morel d'Escures, to oversee the works on and arming of the Portefaix (later the Boussole), and would embark on that ship as ensign. He died trying to negotiate the passage of the bay of Lituya.

== Notes ==
- Genealogy on geneanet samlap
