= Admiral Kingsmill (ship) =

Several vessels operating around 1800 were named Admiral Kingsmill for Sir Robert Kingsmill, 1st Baronet, the first Commander-in-Chief (1797–1800) of the British Royal Navy's Cork Station.

- Admiral Kingsmill (1796 ship) first appeared in Lloyd's Register in 1796, and last appeared in 1800. In between, she was briefly a privateer and then made one voyage as a slave ship.
- Admiral Kingsmill (1798 ship) was launched in Spain. She first appeared in Lloyd's Register. The French privateer Courageaux captured her in April 1799.

== See also ==
- Kingsmill (1798 ship)
