= Legere (disambiguation) =

Legere or Légère are surnames.

Legere or Légère may also refer to:

- French ship Légère
- HMS Legere
