= French ship Courageux =

Several French ships have borne the name Courageux, Courageaux, or Courageuse:

== French Navy ==
- Courageux (1671), a 42-gun ship, broken up in 1673.
- Courageux (1673), an 80-gun ship, renamed Magnanime in 1679. She was sunk during a battle in 1705.
- Courageux (1679), a 56-gun ship, deleted from Navy lists in 1704.
- Courageux (1753), a 74-gun ship, captured in 1761 and taken into service as HMS Courageux. She was wrecked on the coast of Morocco in 1796.
- Courageuse (1778), a 32-gun frigate of the Concorde class, launched in 1778, captured by the British in 1799, and last listed in 1802–3.
- Courageuse (1794), a 40-gun Virginie-class frigate, renamed Justice in 1795
- Courageux was a brigantine of ten 4-pounder guns that the French navy acquired at Toulon in April 1798. She was struck from the lists at Toulon in 1800. That may have occurred after a capture of a vessel by that name on 29 March 1800 that was subsequently taken into Minorca.
- Courageux (1806), a 74-gun Courageux-class ship of the line. She was broken up in 1831.

== French privateers ==
- Courageaux, a privateer of eight guns, 10 swivel guns, and 43 men was blown up in an engagement in August 1797 in the North Sea with Exeter, of Shields, Bowes, master. Only four men were saved. Courageaux may shortly before have taken and sunk Ceres, Robson, master, which had been sailing from Shields to Copenhagen. Courageux (1793), may have been a naval lugger bought by the French Navy while she was still under construction in Dunkirk.
- Courageaux was commissioned in Bordeaux. She made two cruises as a privateer before Alcmene captured her in 1799. The British Royal Navy took her into service as HMS Lutine. She had a brief operational life in the Royal Navy, serving as a prison ship. At the end of the French Revolutionary Wars in 1802 the Royal Navy sold her in the Mediterranean.
- Courageux (or Courageaux) was a privateer that Cruizer captured on 13 July 1799 after a chase of three hours. Courageaux carried 14 guns and a crew of 47 men. She was six weeks out of Dunkirk. During her cruise she had captured four vessels, one of which Cruizer had recaptured the evening before. On 26 July Courageaux arrived at Yarmouth. Courageux (1799), was a privateer from Dunkirk under Jean Vanvlième with 60 men and 14 guns.
- Courageaux was a lugger of five guns and 42 men that HMS Suffisante and Havick captured on 29 January 1800 and sent into Plymouth. Courageux (1797-1800), was 53-tonne privateer commissioned in Saint-Malo in 1797 she made her first cruise in 1797 under Méquet with 44 men. She made her 2nd cruise under François-Auguste Blanchard from November 1797 to February 1798 with 44 men. She made a 3rd cruise from March 1798 under Beaumont. She made a 4th cruise from December 1798 to January 1799 under Alexandre Legrand. She made a 5th cruise under Arthur Leroux from February 1799 to March 1799. She made her sixth and last cruise under Alexandre Legrand again from December 1799 to 1800. She was armed with 4 small guns and one carronade.
