= French ship Infatigable =

French ship Infatigable may refer to the following ships:

- French frigate Infatigable
- French ship Infatigable (1798)
