= Never Recover (disambiguation) =

"Never Recover" is a 2018 song by Lil Baby, Gunna and Drake.

Never Recover may also refer to:

- "Never Recover", a song by The Cardigans from their 1996 album First Band on the Moon
- "Never Recover", a song by Dave Pirner from his 2002 album Faces & Names

== See also ==
- Recovery (disambiguation)
