= Recovery (ship) =

Several vessels have been named Recovery:

- HMS Hyaena (1778) was a 24-gun post ship launched in 1778. The French frigate Concorde captured her in 1793 and she became the privateer Hyene. In 1797 Indefatigable recaptured her near Tenerife. Recommissioned under her old name, Hyaena was sold in 1802. She entered Lloyd's Register in 1804 as the whaler Recovery. Between 1803 and 1813 she made six voyages as a whaler. She was broken up in 1813.
- Recovery (1791 ship) was launched in 1781, possibly under another name. She first appeared in British sources in 1781. She made two voyages as a Bristol-based slave ship, with the first of these giving rise to a landmark court case. She then became a West Indiaman until the French Navy captured her in 1797.
- Recovery (1793 ship) was built at Liverpool. She was a West Indiaman that sailed under a letter of marque. The French privateer Courageaux captured her in 1799. She returned to British ownership by 1800 and continued to trade until she foundered in June 1818 on her way from Hull to Miramichi Bay.
- HMS Lynx (1794) was a 16-gun ship-rigged sloop of the Cormorant-class in the Royal Navy, launched at Gravesend. In 1795 she was the cause of an international incident when she fired on the USRC Eagle. Recovery was at the Battle of Copenhagen in 1801, and during the French Revolutionary and Napoleonic Wars took numerous prizes, mostly merchant vessels but also including some privateers. She was also at the second Battle of Copenhagen in 1807. She was sold in April 1813. She then became the whaler Recovery. She made 12 whaling voyages, the last one ending in 1843, at which time her owner had her broken up.
- Recovery (1802 ship), was launched at Yarmouth, Nova Scotia in 1802. She transferred her registry to Quebec City, Quebec in 1806, and to London in 1807. She traded to the Cape of Good Hope and the West Indies. In January 1812 she was condemned at Nevis after she had sustained damage at sea.
- Recovery (1811 ship) was a merchant ship built at Batavia in 1799 and taken in prize c.1811. She made two voyages transporting convicts from England to Australia and one voyage from Ireland to Australia. She also made two voyages for the British East India Company (EIC). She was last listed in 1847.
- Recovery (1816 ship) was wrecked near Port Stephens, New South Wales, Australia in 1816.
- Recovery (1819 ship) was launched at Ayre in 1819. She traded between Great Britain and North America and the Caribbean. She suffered three major maritime incidents, the first in 1822 and the second in 1826. Her crew abandoned her at sea in August 1829.
- Recovery (1821 ship) was launched at Howrah, Calcutta, in 1821. At some point she was renamed Valetta (or Valletta). She was wrecked in July 1825 while sailing from Sydney to Manila.
- Recovery (1845 ship), of 15447/95 tons (bm), was launched in Dorchester County, Maryland. An Hudson's Bay Company (HBC) agent purchased her in 1852, in Honolulu for £520 ($2,500.00) including a cargo of spars, squared timber, & other produce. She was made seaworthy by coppering. The HBC sold her in 1859.
- USS Recovery was a US Navy salvage ship that served from 1945 to 1994.

== See also ==
- HMS Minerva (1759) was a 32-gun fifth rate launched in 1759, captured by the French in 1778 that the British Royal Navy recaptured in 1781 and renamed HMS Recovery; she was sold in 1784.
- HMS Port Royal (1796) was a 10-gun schooner bought in Jamaica in 1796. The French captured her in 1797 and the British recaptured her later that year, when they renamed her HMS Recovery. She captured three privateers, one in a single-ship action, before she was sold in 1801.
