= Recovery =

Recovery, recover, or recovering may refer to:

== Arts and entertainment ==
=== Books ===
- Recovery (novel), a Star Wars e-book
- Recovery Version, a translation of the Bible with footnotes published by Living Stream Ministry

=== Film and television ===
- Recovery (film), a 2007 BBC television drama
- Recovery (TV series), a 1996 television series from ABC TV
- "Recovery" (NCIS), a 2012 episode of the tenth season of NCIS
- "Recovery", a 2013 episode of the fifth season of NCIS: Los Angeles

=== Music ===
- Recover (band), a post-hardcore band from Austin, Texas

==== Albums and EPs ====
- Recover, EP by Florida band Automatic Loveletter, 2007
- Recover, Vol. 1, EP by Amy Lee, 2016
- Recover (Confide album), 2010
- Recover (Great White album), 2002
- Recover (The Naked and Famous album), 2020
- Recovery (ApologetiX album), 2009
- Recovery, album by algebra, 2014
- Recovery (Aaron Carter album), 2024
- Recovery (Eminem album), 2010
- Recovery (Loudon Wainwright album), 2008
- Recovery (Quando Rondo album), 2023
- Recovery (Runrig album), 1981

==== Songs ====
- "Recover" (song), by The Automatic, 2006
- "Recovery?', by Bury Tomorrow from The Seventh Sun, 2023
- "Recover", by Device from the deluxe edition of Device, 2013
- "Recover", by X Ambassadors from Orion, 2019
- "Recovery", by Funeral for a Friend from Hours, 2005
- "Recovery" (James Arthur song), 2013
- "Recovery" (Justin Bieber song), 2013
- "Recovery", by Runrig from Recovery, 1981
- "Recovering", by Celine Dion, 2016

== Health ==
- Addiction recovery groups, voluntary associations of people who share a common desire to overcome drug addiction
- Convalescence, the gradual recovery of health and strength after illness, injury, or operation
- Cure, the end of a medical condition
- Hair of the dog, or "recovery drinking", the practice of drinking off a hangover
- Healing, the process of the restoration of health from an unbalanced, diseased or damaged organism
  - Wound healing, the physical/mechanical form
- Recovery International, a self-help mental health program based on the work of the late Abraham A. Low, M.D.
- Recovery model, an approach to mental disorder or substance dependence, emphasizes and supports a person's potential for recovery
- Recovery position, a body position used in first aid
- RECOVERY Trial, a British clinical trial programme for treatments for COVID-19
- Post-anesthesia care unit, also known as the recovery room, used after surgery

== Ownership ==
- Civil recovery, legal return of property obtained through unlawful means
- Common recovery, a fictitious legal proceeding in England
- Recovery, the finding and reporting of a ringed bird
- Recovery or repossession, recovering ownership of property

== Science and technology ==
- Android recovery mode, a disaster recovery facility in mobile phones that run the Android operating system
- Recovery (metallurgy), a change in the microstructure in polycrystalline materials
- Recovery (mineral processing), a mass fraction of valuable mineral transferred to a concentrate
- Recovery boiler, generating energy during papermaking
- Recovery effect, a phenomenon in batteries
- recover (command), a primitive file recovery utility is MS-DOS
- Data recovery, a process of salvaging inaccessible data
  - Photo recovery, the process of salvaging digital photographs
  - Automatic system recovery, the process of extracting any valid data from a device after a corruption, bootloop, or soft brick, usually followed by reinstalling the system image
- IT disaster recovery, continuation of vital technology infrastructure and systems following a natural or human-induced disaster
- Energy recovery, techniques and methods of minimising the input of energy to an overall system by the exchange of energy from one sub-system of the overall system with another
- Recovery, when the threats to species survival are neutralized under an endangered species recovery plan created pursuant to the U.S. Endangered Species Act of 1973
- Recovery, extraction of petroleum, the primary, secondary or tertiary recovery of petroleum
- Forensic recovery, where a search and rescue mission involves, or transitions to, missing persons expected to be dead rather than alive
- Resource recovery, the collection of recyclable materials

=== Ecology ===
- Regeneration (ecology) autonomous recovery
- Ecological restoration recovery assisted by human effort

== Vehicles and vessels ==
- Recovery truck or recovery vehicle, used to move or assist other vehicles
- Vehicle recovery (military), a type of military operation conducted to extricate vehicles that have become immobile
- Recovery – one of several ships by that name

== Other uses ==
- Recovery auditing, a systematic review of financial transactions
- Recovery, Georgia, a community in the United States
- Recovery Glacier, Antarctica
- Recovery Hill, U.S. Virgin Islands, a settlement on Saint Croix
