= French ship Légère =

Légère has been the name of many ships in the French Navy including:

- French frigate Légère (1682), launched in 1682 and captured in 1693 becoming HMS Dover Prize
- French corvette Légère (1793), formerly HMS Barbuda captured by France in 1782, subsequently named Legere recaptured by Great Britain in 1796 and wrecked 1801
- French gunboat Légère (1794), captured by Great Britain 1798

== See also ==
- HMS Legere
