= Action of 16 October 1799 =

1799 battle of the War of the Second Coalition

- Part of the War of the Second Coalition
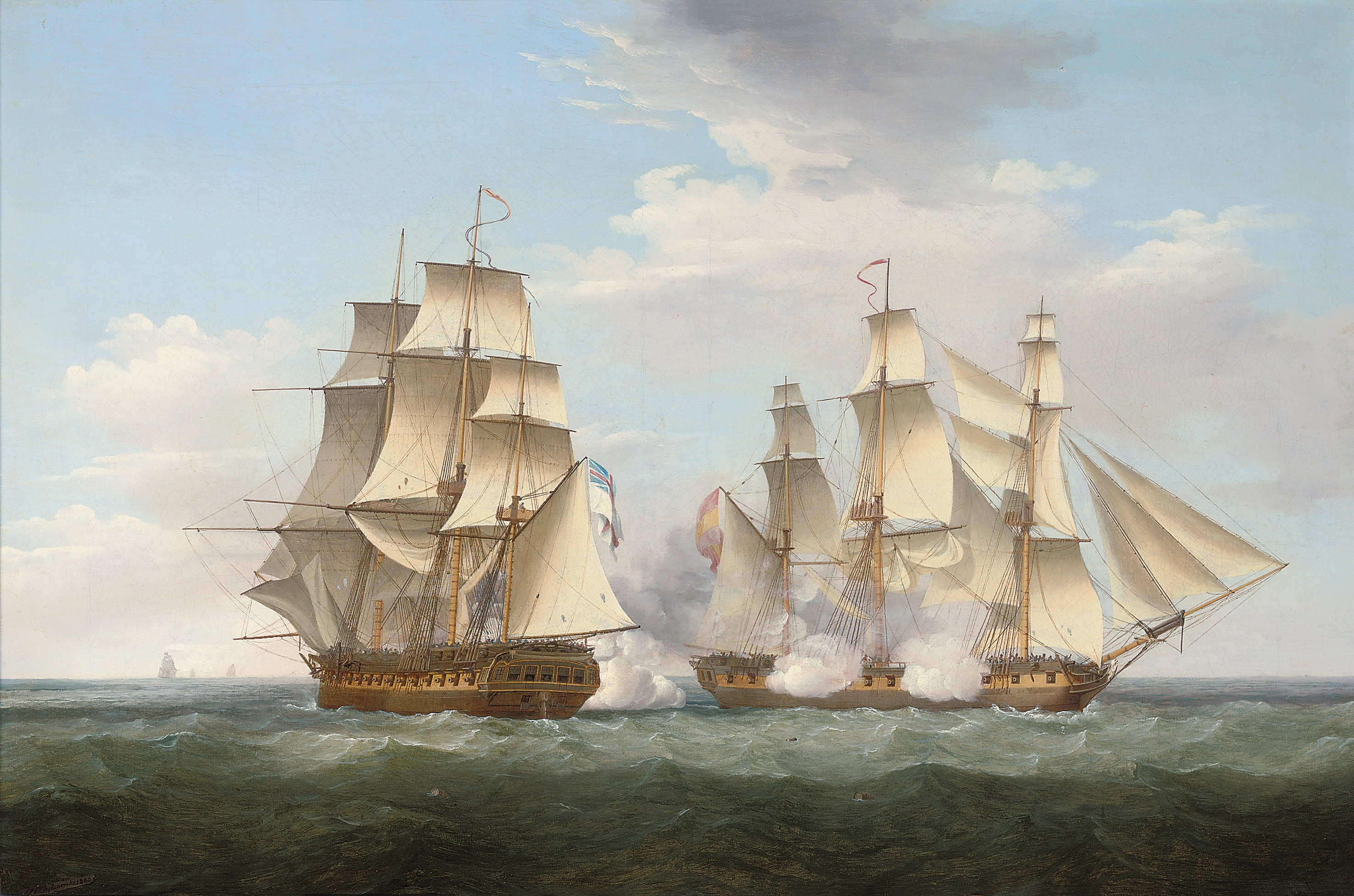
- HMS Ethalion in action with the Spanish frigate Thetis off Cape Finisterre, 16th October 1799; Thomas Whitcombe, 1800
Date	16–17 October 1799
Location	Off Vigo, Atlantic Ocean
Result	British victory

Belligerents
Great Britain	Spain

Commanders and leaders
William Pierrepont	Juan de Mendoza (surrendered); Antonio Pillon (surrendered)

Strength
4 frigates	2 frigates

Casualties and losses
1 killed 10 wounded	3 killed 17 wounded 2 frigates captured

The action of 16 October 1799 was a minor naval engagement during the War of the Second Coalition between a squadron of Royal Navy frigates and two frigates of the Spanish Navy close to the naval port of Vigo in Galicia. Both Spanish ships were a treasure convoy, carrying silver specie and luxury trade goods across the Atlantic Ocean from Spanish America to Spain. Sighted by British frigate HMS Naiad enforcing the blockade of Vigo late on the 15 October, the Spanish ships were in the last stages of their journey. Turning to flee from Naiad, the Spanish soon found themselves surrounded as more British frigates closed in.

Although they separated their ships in an effort to split their opponents, the Spanish captains were unable to escape: Thetis was captured after a short engagement with HMS Ethalion on the morning of 16 October, while Santa Brigida almost reached safety, only being caught on the morning of 17 October in the approaches to the safe harbour at Muros. After a short engagement amid the rocks she was also captured by an overwhelming British force. Both captured ships were taken to Britain, where their combined cargoes were transported with great fanfare to the Bank of England. The eventual value of their cargo was assessed as at least £618,040, resulting in one of the largest hauls of prize money ever awarded.

== Background ==
In 1796, following the secret terms of the Treaty of San Ildefonso, the Kingdom of Spain suddenly reversed its position in the French Revolutionary Wars turning from an enemy of the French Republic into an ally. The Spanish declaration of war on Great Britain forced the British Mediterranean Fleet to abandon the Mediterranean Sea entirely, retreating to ports at Gibraltar and Lisbon. This force now concentrated against the Spanish Navy, most of which was stationed at the main fleet base of Cádiz in Southern Spain. A British blockade fleet won a significant victory over the Spanish at the Battle of Cape St Vincent in February 1797, dissuading the Spanish fleet from playing a significant role in the ongoing war.

Other Spanish ports were also blockaded with the intention of limiting Spanish trade and movement and intercepting treasure convoys from the colonies of New Spain and South America. Vast quantities of gold, silver and valuable trade goods crossed the Atlantic in regular armed frigate convoys. To intercept and seize these shipments the Royal Navy dispatched their own frigates to patrol the Spanish coast. To encourage their sailors, the Royal Navy distributed prize money to the value of the ships and material captured and the seizure of a Spanish treasure fleet could yield spectacular amounts of money: particularly large sums had been captured during previous wars in 1656, 1744 and 1762, but during the first three years of conflict between Great Britain and Spain only one treasure convoy had been intercepted, near Cádiz at the action of 26 April 1797, and on that occasion the treasure was smuggled ashore before the convoy was seized.

== Pursuit and battle ==
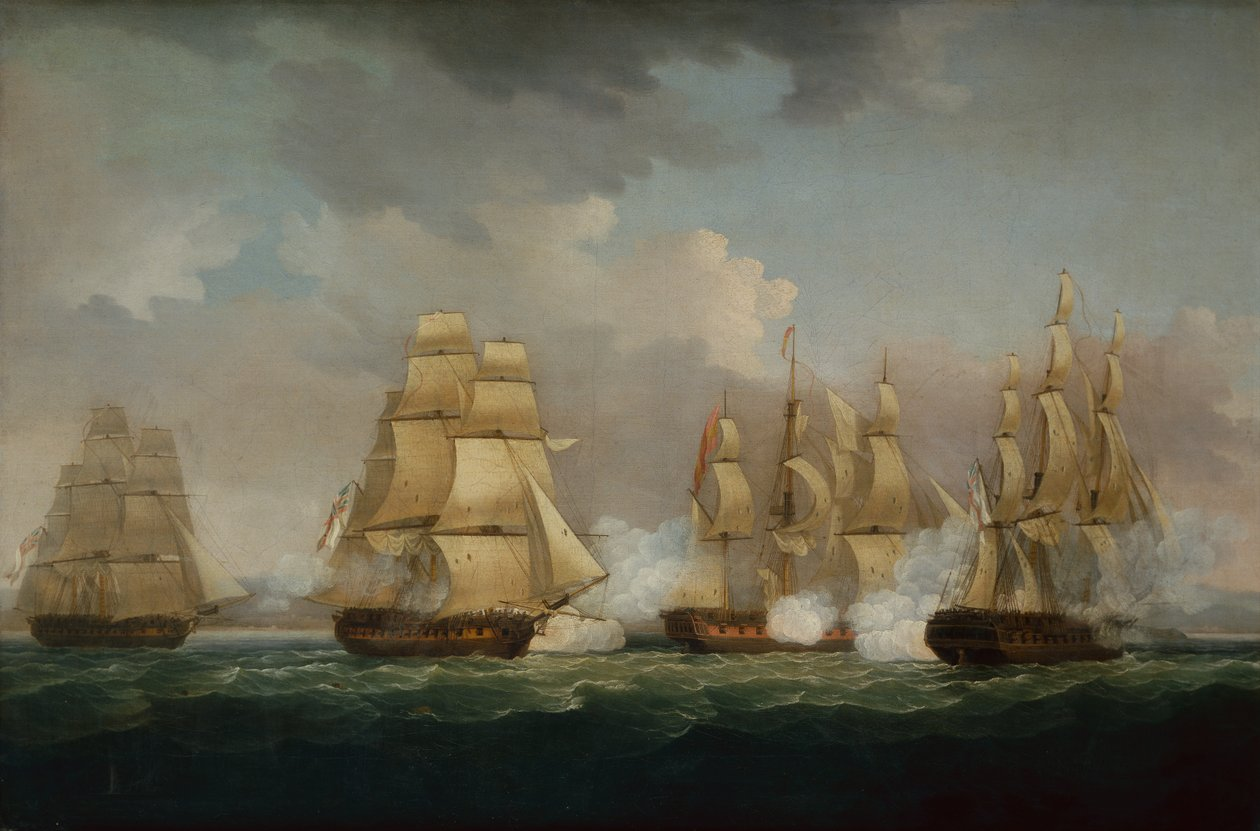
Painting of the British engaging Santa Brigida

On 21 August 1799, a convoy of two 34-gun frigates, Thetis under Captain Don Juan de Mendoza and Santa Brigida under Captain Don Antonio Pillon, sailed from Veracruz in New Spain with a cargo that included cochineal, indigo dye, cocoa and sugar but which principally consisted of more than two million silver Spanish dollars. The passage across the Atlantic was uneventful and by the afternoon of 15 October the convoy, under orders to make any Spanish port, was nearing its destination at Vigo, a fortified port city in Galicia just south of Cape Finisterre at the most northwestern point of Spain. The ports of Northern Spain were blockaded by British frigates sailing independently, crossing the approaches in search of enemy shipping and it was one such ship, the 38-gun HMS Naiad under Captain William Pierrepont, that sighted the Spanish convoy in position 41°01′N 12°35′W at 20:00 on 15 October. Turning away to the southeast, the Spanish ships then made all sail northeast in search of a safe harbour, with Pierrepont in pursuit.

At 03:30 on 16 October, another sail was spotted to the southwest, rapidly revealed to be a second British frigate, the 38-gun HMS Ethalion under Captain James Young. Ethalion joined the chase and at dawn two more sails were sighted, the 32-gun HMS Alcmene under Captain Henry Digby to the west and 32-gun HMS Triton under Captain John Gore to the north. With four British frigates now in full pursuit, the Spanish captains sought to split their enemy and divided, at which Pierrepont directed Ethalion, the closest British ship, to pursue the faster Thetis. Young complied, firing long-range shot in Santa Brigida's direction at 09:00, driving Pillon's ship further from his companion.

As Naiad, Triton and Alcmene streamed past in pursuit of Santa Brigida, Young focused his attention on Thetis, coming within range at 11:30. Mendoza, seeing that battle was inevitable, bore up across Ethalion's bows in an effort to rake Young's ship. Young turned in order to thwart the manoeuvre and fired two rapid broadsides into Thetis, which responded in kind. For an hour the frigates exchanged running fire until Mendoza, realising escape was impossible, surrendered. Thetis had lost one man killed and nine wounded in the exchange while Ethalion had suffered no casualties.

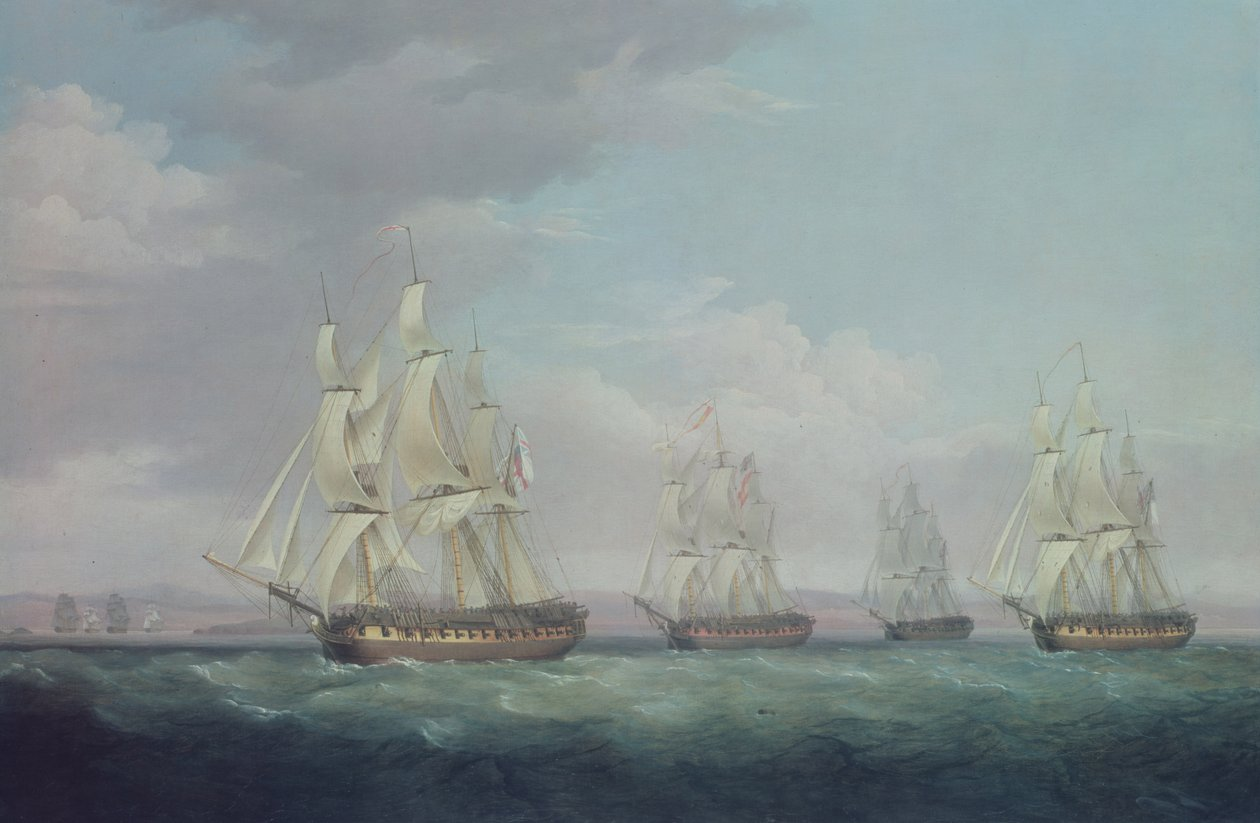
Painting of the battle's end

As Ethalion subdued Thetis the remainder of the British squadron continued southwards in pursuit of Santa Brigida. Pillon was an experienced officer with a good knowledge of the Northern Spanish coast and he intended to lose his pursuers in the rocky channels of Cape Finisterre. Early on 17 October he reached Spanish coastal waters, rounding Finisterre just beyond the Monte Lora rocks. Captain Gore on Triton, which was in full flow at seven knots, was unaware of the obstacle and at 05:00 crashed into them, coming to a juddering halt and inflicting severe damage to his ship's hull. Gore was able however to bring Triton off soon afterwards and continued pursuit, assisted by Digby on Alcmene who was able to block Pillon's route into Porte de Vidre.

Both frigates opened fire on Santa Brigida at 07:00 as the Spanish ship sought shelter in the rocks at Commarurto close to the safe harbour at Muros, Pillon's movement hampered by the coastal rias that blocked the wind. After an hour of resistance, with Naiad belatedly approaching, Pillon was forced to surrender his ship to superior British forces. Santa Brigida had lost two men killed and eight wounded, Alcmene one killed and nine wounded and Triton a single man wounded.

== Aftermath ==
As the British force took control of Santa Brigida, a Spanish squadron of four ships sailed from Vigo with the appearance of intending to bring Pierrepont's squadron to battle. Pierrepont immediately issued orders for his ships to meet with the Spanish who promptly turned about and returned to port without coming within range. A shore breeze enabled the British ships and their prize to extricate themselves from the Commarurto rocks without further damage. They then sailed directly for the fleet base at Plymouth, arriving on 22 October to find that Thetis and Ethalion had reached the port the day before. Dispatches were sent to Lord Bridport, commander of the Channel Fleet, which were then forwarded to the Admiralty and revealed the scale of the prize. Aboard Thetis was found a quantity of trade cocoa and a series of boxes containing coin, including 333 boxes of 3,000 dollars each, four boxes of 2,385 dollars each, 94 boxes containing 4,000 dollars each and two golden doubloons and 90 golden half-doubloons. This totalled 1,385,292 silver dollars, with a sterling value of £311,690. On Santa Brigida were trade cocoa, sugar, indigo and cochineal worth in total about £5,000 as well as 446 boxes containing 3,000 dollars each, 59 bags and three kegs of dollars and numerous loose coins, for a total value of at least 1,338,000 silver dollars or £301,350. Altogether the sterling value of the cargo was calculated as not less than £618,040 (the equivalent of £61,035,000 in 2025). The captured ships however were written off as worthless, although some additional money was made auctioning off their naval stores.

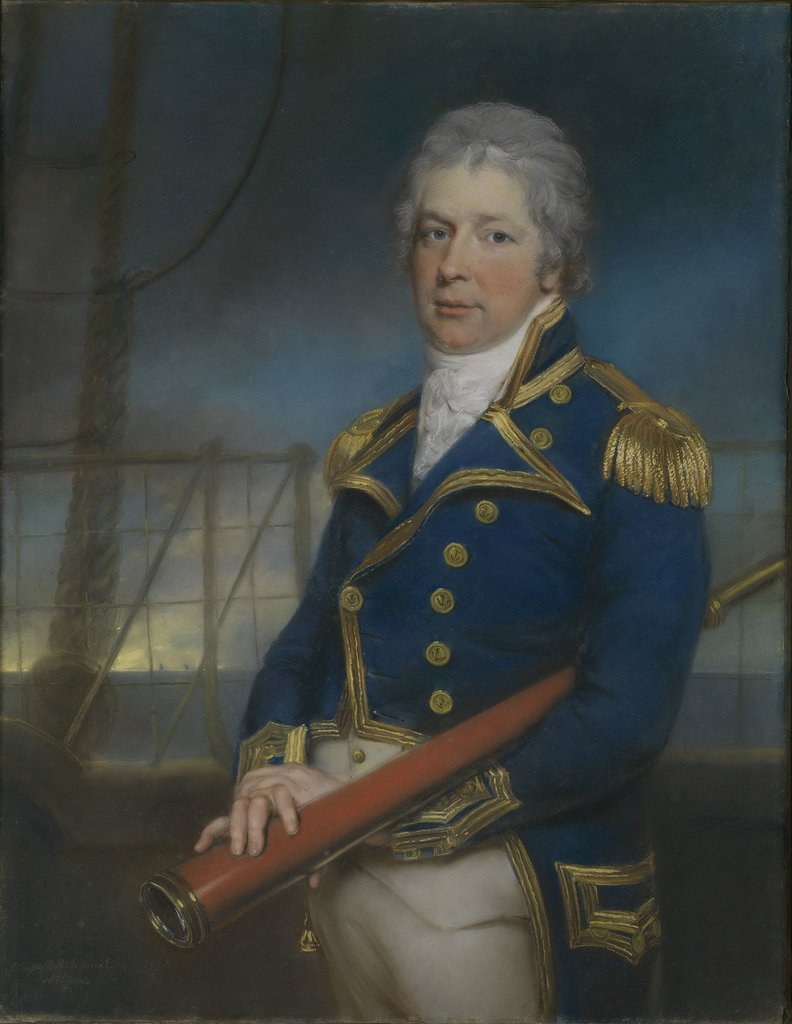
1801 portrait of Pierrepont by John Russell

This vast sum of money was transported through Plymouth on 63 wagons, guarded by armed sailors and marines and accompanied by musical bands and cheering crowds to the security of the Royal Citadel. It remained in Plymouth until November when it was removed to London with considerable ceremony and placed at the Bank of England. The sums awarded as prize money, distributed in equal proscribed shares among the crews of Ethalion, Naiad, Alcmene and Triton were among the largest ever recorded. Each captain was given £40,730 (of which a third was due to the admiral in command), each lieutenant £5,091, each warrant officer £2,468, each midshipman £791 and each sailor or marine £182. For the regular seamen, this total was 15 times their annual pay of £12. As historian James Henderson noted "even the humblest seaman could set himself up with a cosy pub". For the captains, normally paid £150 a year, this was more money than they could make in 270 years. After receiving their prize money, the sailors of the squadron were noted in the streets of Portsmouth wearing "bank notes stuck in their hats, buying watches for the fun of frying them, and issuing laws that any of their crew who appeared without a gold-laced hat should be cobbed, so that the unlucky man who appeared in silver could only escape by representing that the costlier articles were all bought up, but he had compelled the shopkeeper to take money for gold lace."

On the only subsequent occasion when a Spanish treasure fleet was successfully intercepted, at the action of 5 October 1804, an even greater haul was captured. On that occasion however the Admiralty used an obscure regulation to seize the bulk of the prize and the captains only received around £15,000 each. Captain John Gore, commanding first HMS Triton and later HMS Medusa, received a share of the money on both occasions. Historian Richard Woodman has noted that this action illustrates both the dominance of the Royal Navy and its high standards at this stage in the war, stating that "The coincidental appearance of four frigates in the vast Atlantic testifies to the enormous resources the British put into the prosecution of the war. That the four frigate captains proceeded to act in such perfect concert is further evidence, if it were needed, of the shared standards of mutual help and assistance".
