= William Pierrepont =

William Pierrepont may refer to:

- William Pierrepont (politician) (c. 1607–1678)
- William Pierrepont, 4th Earl of Kingston-upon-Hull (c. 1662–1690)
- William Pierrepont (1669–1706), MP for Nottingham (UK Parliament constituency)
- William Pierrepont (Royal Navy officer) (1766–1813)
