= Woodman (ship) =

Several vessels have been named Woodman:

== Woodman (1804 ship) ==
- Woodman was launched in Newcastle in 1804, and first appeared in the Register of Shipping in 1805. She sailed as a coaster. On 19 August 1811 a French privateer captured Woodman, Wanless, master, off Dover, as Woodman was sailing from Newcastle to Southampton. HMS Echo recaptured her shortly thereafter. Woodman arrived at Ramsgate on 20 August. HMS Naiad was in company with Echo and so shared in the salvage money for Woodman. Woodman was last listed in 1815 but may have been lost a year or two before.

== Woodman (1808 ship) ==
- Woodman (1808 ship) was launched at Gainsborough. She traded with northern Spain and then became a West Indiaman, and later a government transport. From 1816 on she made several voyages to India and South East Asia, sailing under a licence from the British East India Company (EIC). She also made two voyages transporting convicts, one to New South Wales (NSW) in 1823 and one to Van Diemen's Land in 1825. She was lost in 1836.
