= HMS Naiad (1797) =

Frigate of the Royal Navy

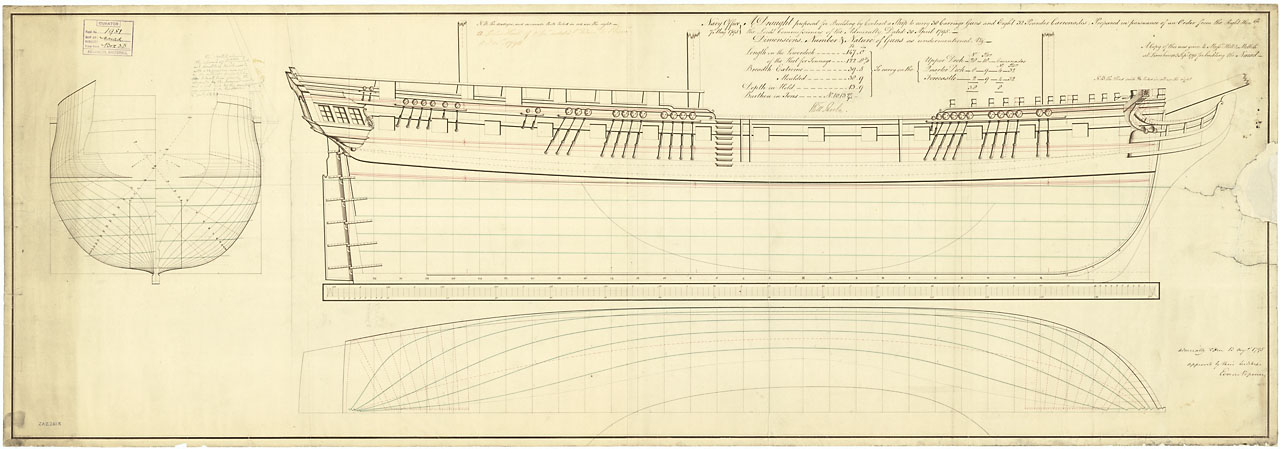
- Naiad

History

Great Britain
- Name: HMS Naiad
- Builder: Hall & Co., Limehouse
- Launched: 1797
- Commissioned: 1798
- Out of service: 1826
- Honours and awards: Naval General Service Medal (NGSM) with clasp "Trafalgar"
- Fate: Broken up 1898
- Notes: Depot ship between 1846 and 1898

General characteristics
- Class & type: Amazon-class frigate
- Tons burthen: 101390/94 ((bm)
- Length: 147 ft (44.8 m) (gun deck); 122 ft 8 3/8 in (37.4 m) (keel)
- Beam: 39 ft 5 in (12.0 m)
- Depth of hold: 13 ft 9 in (4.2 m)
- Propulsion: Sails
- Complement: 284 (later 315)
- Armament: Upper deck: 28 × 18-pounder guns; QD: 2 × 9-pounder guns + 10 × 32-pounder carronades; Fc: 2 × 9-pounder guns + 4 × 32-pounder carronades

HMS Naiad was a Royal Navy fifth-rate frigate that served in the Napoleonic Wars. She was built by Hall and Co. at Limehouse on the Thames, launched in 1797, and commissioned in 1798. She served in the French Revolutionary and Napoleonic Wars, and her last actions occurred in 1824–5. She was paid off in 1826. She then served for many years in Latin America as a coal depot, first for the Royal Navy and then for the Pacific Steam Navigation Company. She was broken up in 1898, 101 years after her launching.

== Design ==
Naiad was built to a design by Sir William Rule. She was an expanded version of his Amazon-class frigates of 1795. Rule's original Amazon class were 32-gun, 12-pounder, frigates of 677 tons (bm), built between 1771 and 1782. In need of a larger frigate, in 1794, the Admiralty asked for a 36-gun, 18-pounder version. Originally intended as a series of four, by the time the first one, HMS Amazon, had been launched in 1795, Rule had already drawn up plans for Naiad.

Work began in September 1795 at Limehouse when Naiad's keel of 122 ft 8 3/4 in (37.408 m) was laid down. As built, her dimensions were 147 ft 0 in (44.81 m) along the gun deck with a beam of 39 ft 5 in (12.01 m) and a depth in hold of 13 ft 9 in (4.19 m), making her 1,018 91/94 tons burthen (bm).

Naiad was a 38-gun fifth rate, built to carry a main battery of twenty-eight 18-pounder (8.2-kilogram) long guns on her gun deck, two 9 pdr (4.1 kg) on the quarterdeck and two on the forecastle. She additionally carried fourteen 32 pdr (15 kg) carronades, ten on the quarterdeck and four on the forecastle.

== French Revolutionary Wars ==
Captain William Pierrepoint took command of Naiad in April 1797.

On 3 April 1798 Naiad captured Mary and Elizabeth. Sixteen days later, Naiad, Mars and Ramillies were in sight when Jason captured the French gun-brig Arrogante. Arrogante was armed with six long 24-pounder guns and had a crew of 92 men. The British took her into service as HMS Arrogante, but then renamed her HMS Insolent in August. Next, Naiad and Sylph took Vriendfchap Beerens on 16 May.

On 11 August, some 42 leagues from Cape Finisterre, and after a chase of four hours, Naiad captured the French privateer Tigre, which was under the command of Stephen Bonaventure Aggaret. Tigre was armed with eight 4-pounder guns and eight swivels. She had a crew of 31 men, having put another 22 men aboard the prizes that she had taken in the eight days since she had left Groire.

Next, on 24 August, Naiad was chasing a French frigate, which chase Magnanime joined. After about three hours the two British ships had caught up with their quarry, which proceeded for the next hour to fire on them with her stern chasers. She then struck. The French ship was the frigate Décade, with a crew of 336 men under the command of Citoyen Villeneau. Décade was pierced for 44 guns, but she had landed ten in Cayenne, from where she was sailing. In all, Naiad had chased Décade for 36 hours. The British took Décade into service.

Naiad's success in prize-taking continued. On 5 March 1799 she captured the French privateer Hereux Hazard, off the Loire. Heureux Hazard was armed with sixteen 6 and 9-pounder guns, but was pierced for 20 guns. She had a crew of 94 men and had left Nantes the previous day, provisioned for a three-month cruise. At the time of the capture Ethalion and Melpomene were in sight, and so entitled to share in the prize money.

The next day Naiad met up with Ethalion, which had just that day too captured the privateer Indefatigable, of 18 guns and 120 men. Indefatigable too was just one day out of Nantes and provisioned for a long cruise. On 12 March Naiad, Cambrian, San Fiorenzo, and Triton were in company when Triton captured the French merchant brig Victoire.

In September Naiad recaptured the ship Princess Royal. However, Naiad's biggest prize was yet to come.

=== Capture of Thetis and Santa Brigada ===
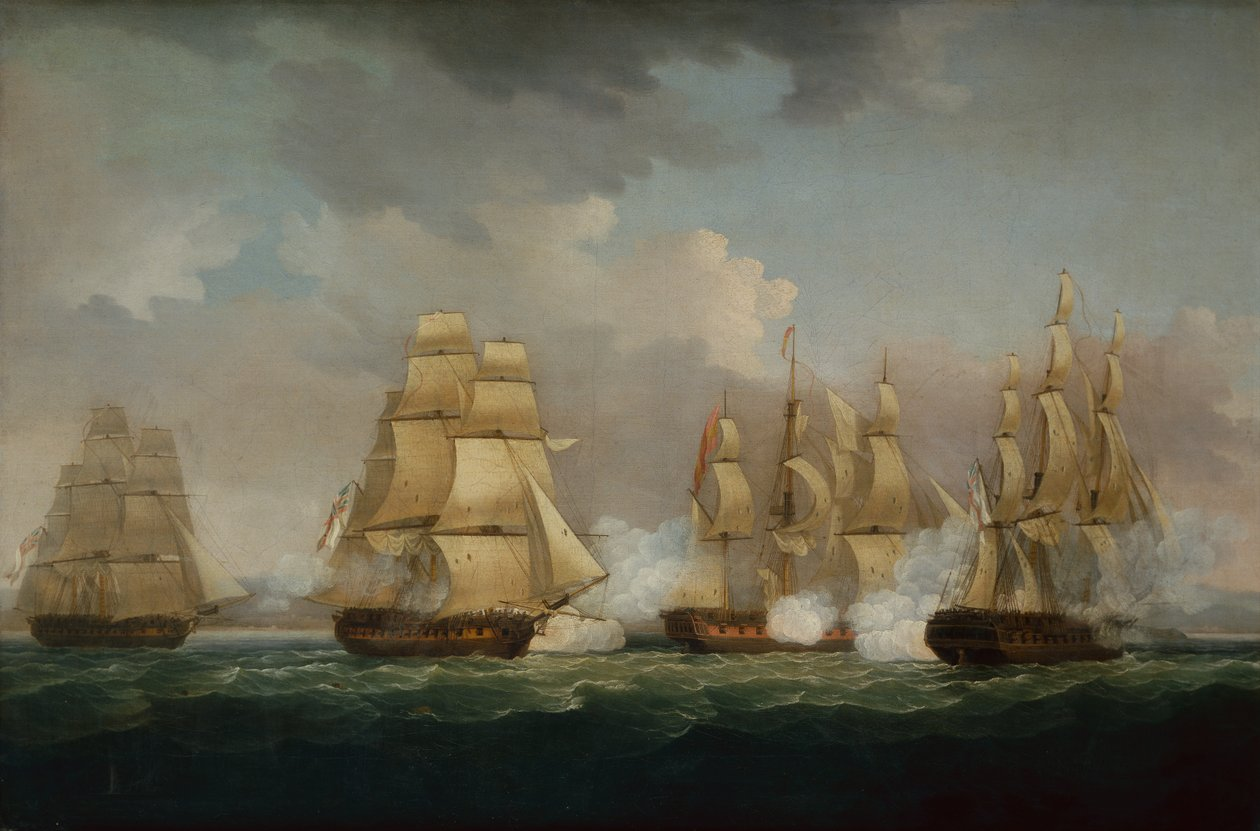
Painting of Naiad engaging Santa Brigida alongside Alcamene and Triton by Thomas Whitcombe

On 15 October 1799 Naiad sighted two Spanish frigates. Pierrepont gave chase and before dawn Ethalion spotted them and joined the pursuit. At 7.00 am the two Spaniards parted company so Pierrepont followed one frigate, together with Alcmene and Triton, which too had joined the chase, while directing Ethalion, to pursue the other frigate. By 11.30 am, Ethalion had caught up with her quarry and after a short engagement the Spanish vessel struck her colours. Ethalion had no casualties though the Spaniard had one man killed and nine wounded.

Triton, the fastest of the three British frigates, led the chase of the first frigate. The next morning Triton struck some rocks as she tried to prevent her quarry from reaching port. Triton got off the rocks and resumed the chase despite taking on water. She and Alcmene then exchanged fire with the Spanish frigate, which surrendered before Naiad could catch up. Four large Spanish ships came out from Vigo but then retreated when the three British frigates made ready to receive them. Alcmene had one man killed and nine wounded, and Triton had one man wounded; Santa Brigida had two men killed and eight men wounded.

The vessel that Ethalion had captured turned out to be Thetis, under the command of Captain Don Juan de Mendoza. She was homeward-bound from Vera Cruz (Mexico) with a cargo of cocoa, cochineal and sugar, and more importantly, specie worth 1,385,292 Spanish dollars (£312,000). The vessel that Triton, Alcmene, and Naiad had captured was Santa Brigada, under the command of Captain Don Antonio Pillon. She was carrying a cargo of drugs, annatto, cochineal, indigo and sugar, and some 1,500,000 dollars. Prize money was paid on 14 January 1800. (Note: Each of the four British captains received £40,730 18s 0d; each marine and sailor received £182 4s 9½, A seaman's share was probably equal to five to six years' salary.)

At some point Triton, with Naiad, Alcmene, and Ethalion in company, recaptured the American ship Abigail.

On 12 September 1800 the hired armed cutter Suwarrow cut out the French brig Providence from under two batteries near Camaret Point. She was carrying wine, soap and brandy for the Brest fleet; the capture took place under heavy fire but Suworow suffered no casualties. Although the third rate Elephant and Naiad were in sight, they voluntarily relinquished their share of the prize money to Suwarrow.

In December Captain the Honorable John Murray replaced Pierrepont, who was ill. Naiad spent the following year cruising out of Plymouth.

In December 1800, Captain William H. Rickets replaced Murray of Naiad. At the beginning of May 1801 she recaptured, some 500 miles west of Cape Finisterre, the packet Phoenix, Captain Thompson. Phoenix had sailed from Falmouth on 15 April for New York and had the misfortune to encounter a French 40-gun privateer on 21 April. Although he could not escape capture, Thompson was able to sink his mails before being boarded. While still a French prize, Phoenix also encountered Concarde and Corneille, two large French frigates taking troops and stores from Nantes to Egypt. After her recapture, Phoenix arrived safely in Plymouth on 11 May. The hired armed cutter Earl St Vincent shared in the capture.

On the night of 16 May 1801, boats from Naiad and Phaeton, under the direction of Naiad's First lieutenant, entered the port of Marín, Pontevedra, in Galicia in north-west Spain. There they captured the Spanish corvette Alcudia and destroyed the armed packet Raposo, both under the protection of a battery of five 24-pounders. Alcudia, commanded by Don Jean Antonio Barbuto, was moored stem and stern close to the fort. Her sails had previously been taken ashore so the boats had to tow her out but soon after a strong south-west wind set in and Rickets thought it necessary to set her on fire. Naiad and Phaeton suffered only four men wounded.

Naiad returned to Plymouth on 25 May 1801 and now under the command of Captain Phillip Wilkinson sailed again on 6 June with bullocks and vegetables for the Channel fleet. She was back in Plymouth for two days at the end of August.

At the end of October a violent gale almost wrecked Naiad near the Île de Ré. She sat for two days on shore under the guns of a French battery, which, much to the mystification of her captain and crew, did not fire on them. On the second day the French commander sent boats with spare cables and anchors and informed Wilkinson that England had signed the preliminaries of a peace treaty with France. Naiad returned to Plymouth on 1 November.

== Napoleonic Wars ==
Throughout most of 1802 Naiad was in ordinary but on 9 September orders came down for her to be commissioned in place of Fisgard, which was to be paid off. Captain James Wallis and the crew of Fisgard were to transfer to Naiad when she was ready for commissioning. On 18 December it was announced that Naiad would have to supply men to Belleisle, then fitting out for foreign service, if Belleisle was still short crew. Apparently they were not needed.

In early 1803, Naiad succeeded in taking several prizes. Her boats, with those from Hazard, cut out a new brig from among the Penmarks off Brest while under fire from French batteries. They also cut out and sank a chasse-maree. These were probably the French brig Jeanne and the galiot Balier, which they captured on 10 May. On 19 May Naiad and Hazard also captured Frauen Brigitta.

On 29 May, in the Bay of Biscay, Naiad captured the French corvette Impatiente, which was under the command of Citizen Hypolite Arnous, lieutenant de vaisseau. Impatient was armed with 20 guns, some of which she had thrown overboard during the chase. She and her crew were sailing from Senegal to Rochefort when Naiad captured her. Two days later Naiad captured the French merchant ship Chasseur, of 359 tons burthen. She was under the command of Citizen Lamar, Lieutenant de Vaisseau, and was carrying sugar, cotton and coffee from San Domingo to Lorient.

Next, Naiad and Doris captured a French brig from the Straits and a Dutch sloop, also from the Straits, carrying drugs and medicines. Naiad and Doris also took a French corvette from Gorée laden with gum and ivory. These vessels came into Plymouth on 4 June. That same day Naiad arrived with two French ships and two Dutch ships that she and Doris had also captured.

Then 2 June, Naiad captured Napoleon, a French brig from Guadeloupe bound for Nantes with sugar and coffee. On 5 July she captured Providence. On 8 July she captured the brig Prudente, and on 8 August the brig Anne Marie.

On 4 July Wallis sent Naiad's boats to cut out a French schooner lying at anchor at the Saints. Next morning, in spite of the strong tides and the many rocks and shoals in the area, they brought the schooner out without loss as almost the entire crew, including the commander, Citizen Martres Preville, lieutenant de vaisseau, had fled at their approach. The prize was Providence, which had only two guns mounted but was laden with 36, 24 and 18-pounder cannon she was taking to Brest from a foundry near Nantes. Her cargo also included some choice timber.

Naiad returned to Plymouth from her cruise on 7 September and went in for a refit. This was completed on 2 October when she went from Barnpool out into the Sound to await orders. On 5 October she received six months of wages, and sailed the next day down the Channel, before anyone could spend any of their accumulated pay.

During the following fifteen weeks Naiad cruised off Ferrol and A Coruña with Sir Edward Pellew's squadron. The squadron experienced severe gales but in spite of the weather blowing them off station on several occasions, the squadron succeeded in preventing the French squadrons from Ferrol and Corunna linking up. On 29 November Ardent forced the French frigate Bayonnaise aground in Finisterre Bay where her crew set fire to her so that she blew up. Naiad was among the vessels in Pellew's squadron sharing, by agreement, in the head money.

Naiad left the squadron on 8 January 1804 when they were close in to Ferrol, to carry dispatches to Admiral William Cornwallis off Ushant. She left the Admiral on 10 January and arrived back in Plymouth four days later.

On 31 January 1804 Captain J. Pellew was appointed to command Naiad while Wallis was dangerously ill at home in Storehouse. At some point in 1804 Captain Thomas Dundas took command of Naiad.

Her next station was with the squadron off Brest and she brought back dispatches for the Admiralty on 10 May.

On 15 June a court martial ordered the Honorable Alexander Jones, then a lieutenant in Naiad, to be shot for striking Lieutenant William Dean, the senior lieutenant, during a quarrel. Dean was dismissed from the service for ungentlemanly conduct. The court recommended clemency for Jones; ten days later he received a pardon and was restored to his former rank. (Jones was promoted to commander on 22 January 1806. Dean was restored to his former rank in 1821 but died five years later.) Naiad sailed for a cruise off the coast of Spain on 24 September.

On 27 November, while Naiad was off Brest, Thomas saw some small vessels open musket fire on boats belonging to Aigle and wound two seamen. Naiad captured Gun-boats Nos. 361 and 369. Each mounted one long brass 4-pounder and one short 12-pounder and had on board a lieutenant from the 63rd Infantry Regiment, 36 privates and six seamen. They had sailed with fourteen others from Dandiorne to Brest. Thomas sent the gunboats back to Britain under the escort of Dispatch.

Naiad returned to Plymouth on 7 January 1805 from a cruise off the coast of Spain. She brought with her a large Spanish ship with 200,000 dollars on board plus a valuable cargo of dry goods. This was Nuestra Senora de los Dolores, which Naiad had captured five days earlier. Naiad sailed again on 8 January on a cruise to the westward. She sent in a neutral ship flying Papenburg colours, suspected of carrying Spanish property.

On 15 February Naiad was in sight when Hazard captured the Dutch schooner Der Vriede. Next, Naiad capture Mars on 25 June. Naiad was in company with Pickle on 9 July 1805 when they captured the brig Argo and the sloop Nelly. Then on 10 September Naiad detained the American ship Wells, of eleven men and 205 tons (bm). Wells was sailing from Salem to Marseilles with a cargo of sugar and coffee.

=== Trafalgar ===
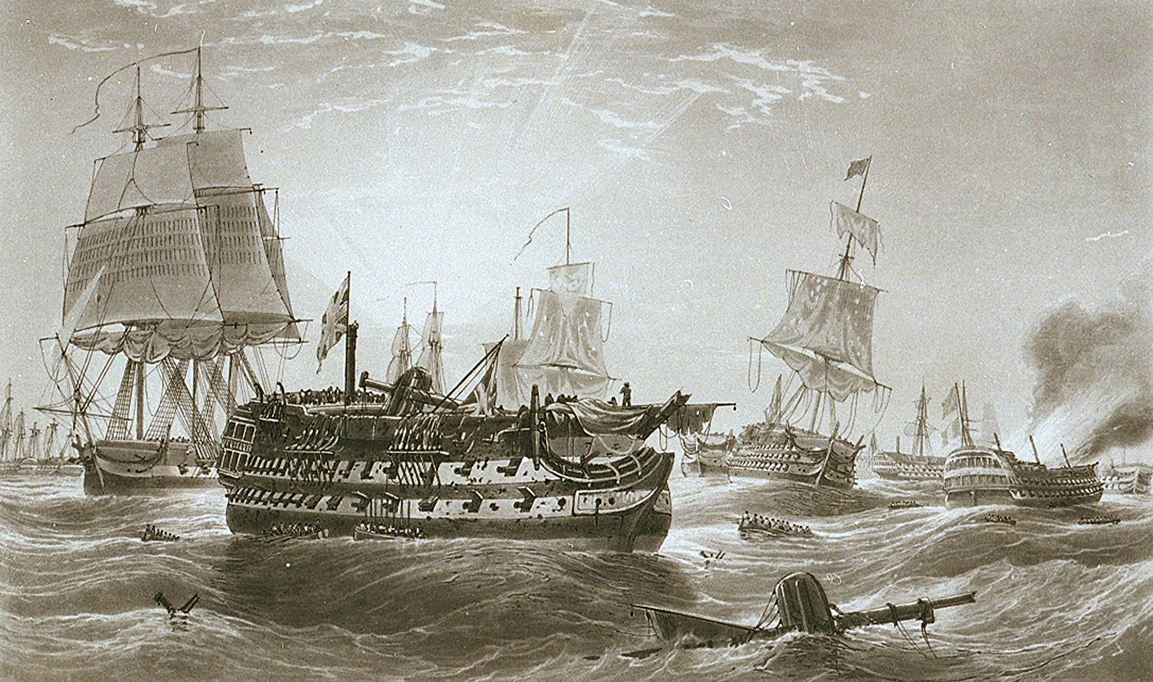
Naiad closes in on the beleaguered Belleisle

Circa 1 October, the arrival of the frigates Naiad, Phoebe, Sirius, Juno, and Niger off Cádiz allowed Nelson to detach them to disrupt local shipping supplying provisions for the joint fleet in Cádiz. By 10 October Naiad was engaged in the tactical preparations etc. for the forthcoming battle. On 20 October the combined fleet departed Cádiz.

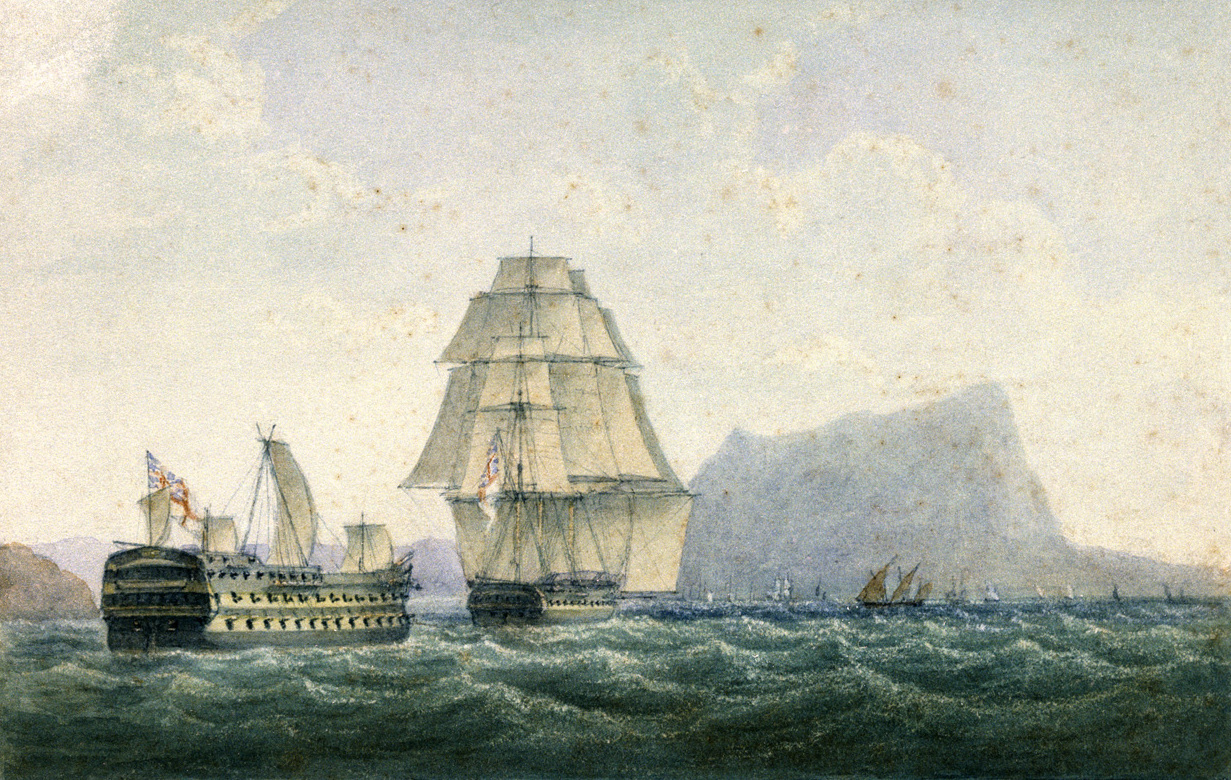
Naiad tows the Belleisle towards Gibraltar, 23 October 1805

During the Battle of Trafalgar on 21 October, Naiad was too small to take part in the battle itself. Instead, she lay to windward of the action. After the battle she destroyed the grounded Monarca and towed Belleisle to Gibraltar.

In September 1806 Parliament voted a grant of £300,000 to the participants in the battle, with the crew of Naiad being among the beneficiaries. (Note: A petty officer's share was £26 6s 0d; a seaman's share was £4 12s 6d. In addition there the crews received prize and head money. In February 1807 there was distribution of prize money. A petty officer's share was £10 14s 0d; a seaman's share was £1 17s 6d.) In 1847, the Admiralty issued the NGSM with clasp "Trafalgar" to all surviving claimants from the battle.

=== 1806–1808 ===
Naiad was in company with Diamond and the gun-brigs Cracker and Clinker when they captured the ship William Little, John J. P. Champlin, master, on 17 October 1806. (Note: A petty officer's share of the prize money was 17s 4p; a seaman's share was 4s 4d.)

On 13 August 1807, Cassandra brought dispatches from England to Naiad, which was with the squadron blockading Bordeaux. Lieutenant Le Blanc, captain of Cassandra, left her to take the dispatches to Naiad. Two sudden squalls rolled Cassandra over on her beam ends, capsizing her. She sank stern first. Eleven men, and one woman and her child drowned.

Three months later, on 10 October 1807, Naiad captured the Kniphausen galliot Vigilante. At the time of the capture, Phoenix and Minerva were in sight.

In 1808 Naiad participated in the blockade of Brest. On 23 May Iris was in company with Naiad when they captured the American packet ship Margaret Tingey.

Between June and August Naiad was in Plymouth making good defects. Then Naiad was in company when Narcissus captured the French schooner Louise on 9 November. On 16 December Naiad was still in company with Narcissus, when they captured two French privateers, Fanny and Superb while on the Home station. Fanny carried 16 guns and a crew of 80 men. She was under the command of Charles Hamon, who as captain of the privateer Venus, had captured numerous British vessels. Fanny was only a few hours out of Nantes on her way to the Irish coast and had made no captures. Then at midnight Naiad and Narcissus captured the French letter of marque sloop Superb. Superb was armed with four guns, had a crew of 20 men, and was sailing to Martinique with a cargo of sundries.

=== 1809 ===
On 7 February 1809 Naiad was in the squadron under the command of Commodore William Hotham and so shared in the proceeds of the capture of the French vessel Prudent. Then on 23 February Naiad was at anchor to the north-west of the Chassiron lighthouse with Defiance, Donegal and Emerald, the squadron now being under the command of Rear Admiral Robert Stopford in Caesar. The next day they saw eight sail-of-the-line and two frigates flying French colours and standing into the Pertuis d'Antioche.

Stopford immediately sent Naiad to warn Admiral Lord Gambier that the French squadron from Brest had arrived but, before she had gone a few miles, Naiad sighted three French frigates heading for Les Sables-d'Olonne and signalled Stopford. Stopford left Amethyst and Emerald to watch the enemy and went in chase of the frigates with the rest of his squadron, now strengthened by the arrival of Amelia and Dotterel. The French anchored under the protection of batteries but the fire from the British ships soon drove them ashore. By 2 March her crew had abandoned one of the French frigates. The other two were afloat at high water but on their beam ends at low water; a westerly swell was expected to destroy them. Stopford returned to blockade the main French force at the Ile d'Aix until 7 March when Gambier arrived to take command.

From March to October Naiad was under the command of Captain George Cocks (acting). Captain Henry Hill then assumed command. On 22 March Naiad, under the command of Cocks, and in company with Triumph, captured the Josephine. Next, on 14 April, Naiad recaptured Renomée. A week later she captured Speculation. Then on 25 April she captured Maria Dorothea. On 19 July Naiad was in company with Medusa when they captured the schooner Eugenie.

On 8 August three Danish vessels arrived at Leith. They were prizes to Nightingale, Naiad, and Snake.

On 21 October Naiad, now under the command of Hill, recaptured the ship Minerva. Naiad was among the vessels in sight when the schooner Snapper captured the French brig Modeste.

=== 1810–1813 ===
On 21 January 1810, Naiad captured the French chasse maree St. Anne.

A court martial was held on board Salvador del Mundo in the Hamoaze On 26 and 27 March. The accused were eight petty officers and seamen from Naiad. The charge was that they had written mutinous letters to the Admiralty, complaining of tyrannical treatment by Hill, and had tried to induce the ship's company to request that they be drafted from Naiad. Three crew members were sentenced be hanged. One received a sentence of 150 lashes; one of 100; and two of 50 lashes each around the fleet. In June Captain Wolley read a pardon to the men sentenced to death, and delivered a suitable admonition. Most of the rest of the men were also pardoned. On 23 May 1810, Naiad recaptured Paragon. (Note: The French privateer Hirondelle had captured Paragon near Wight the day before as Paragon was sailing from Malta to Hull.)

In 1811 Hill left Naiad; being too senior to command a frigate, he was not employed again.

Hill's replacement in July 1811 was Captain Philip Carteret. On 19 August Echo, with Naiad in company, recaptured the Newcastle coaster Woodman, which a French privateer had captured.

Under Carteret Naiad participated in an action with gunboats off Boulogne on 20 September. The French flotilla consisted of seven praams of twelve 24-pounder guns each, ten brigs of four long 24-pounders guns each, and one sloop with two long 24-pounders. The praams' crews totalled about 120 men, and they were under the command of Rear-Admiral Baste. The praams cannonaded Naiad for about three-quarters of an hour before the other vessels came up and added desultory fire for another two hours. Eventually the French vessels gave up their attack and returned to the safety of anchorages under the protection of batteries. In all this Naiad suffered no casualties.

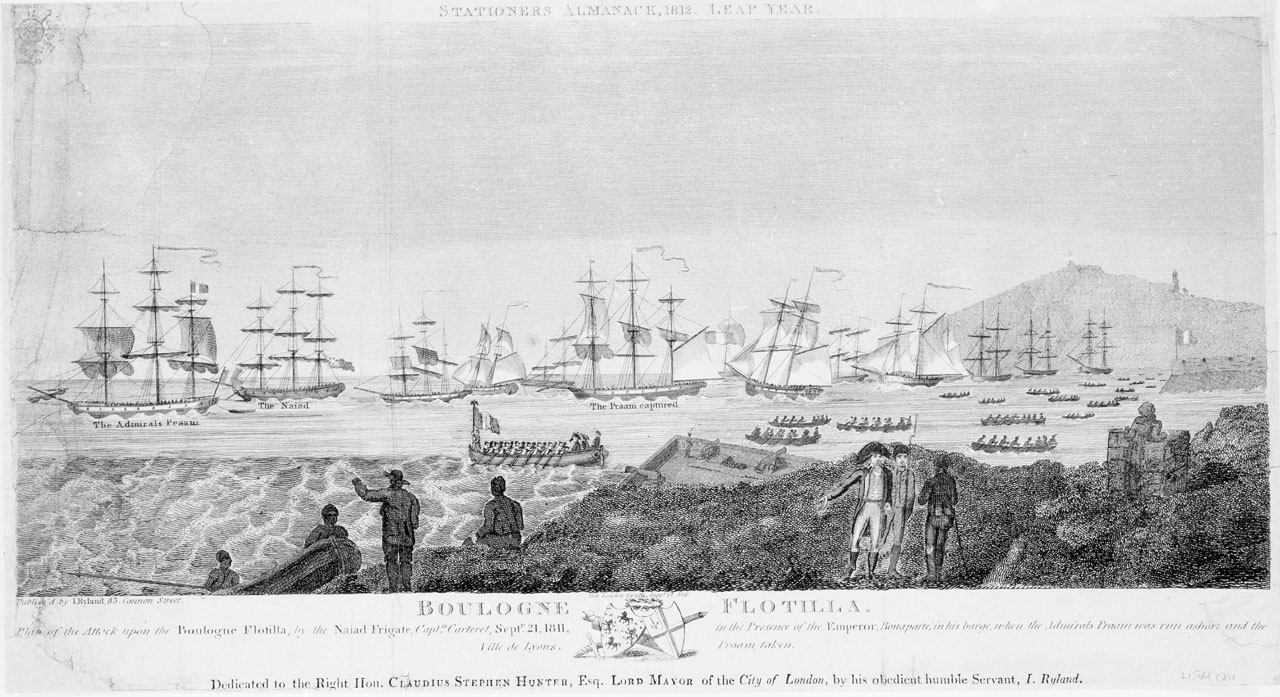
"Plan of the attack upon the Boulogne flotilla, by the frigate 'Naiad', 21 September 1811" (1812).

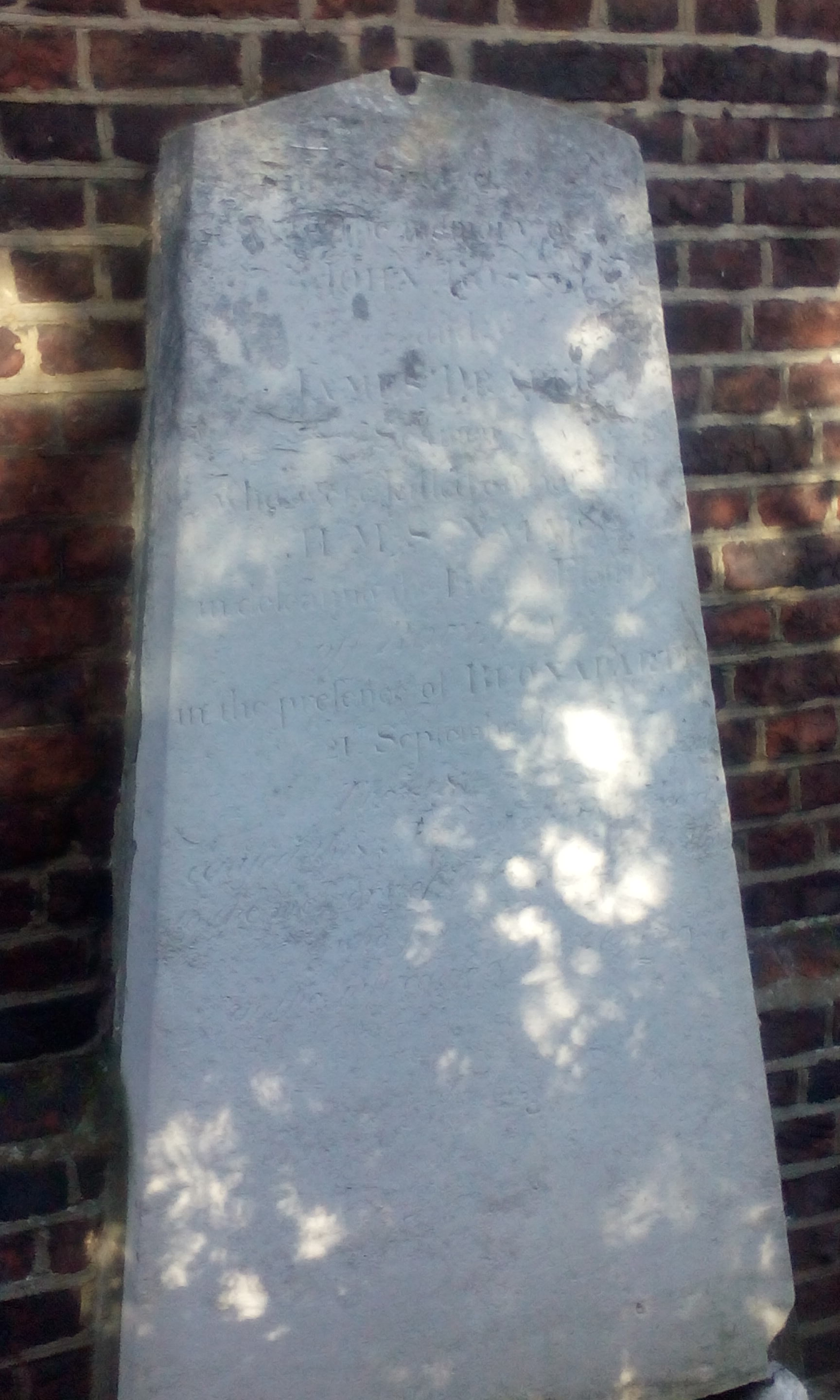
Memorial in the churchyard of St George's, Deal, Kent to John Ross and James Draper, the two seamen killed on board the Naiad during 21 September 1811 action.

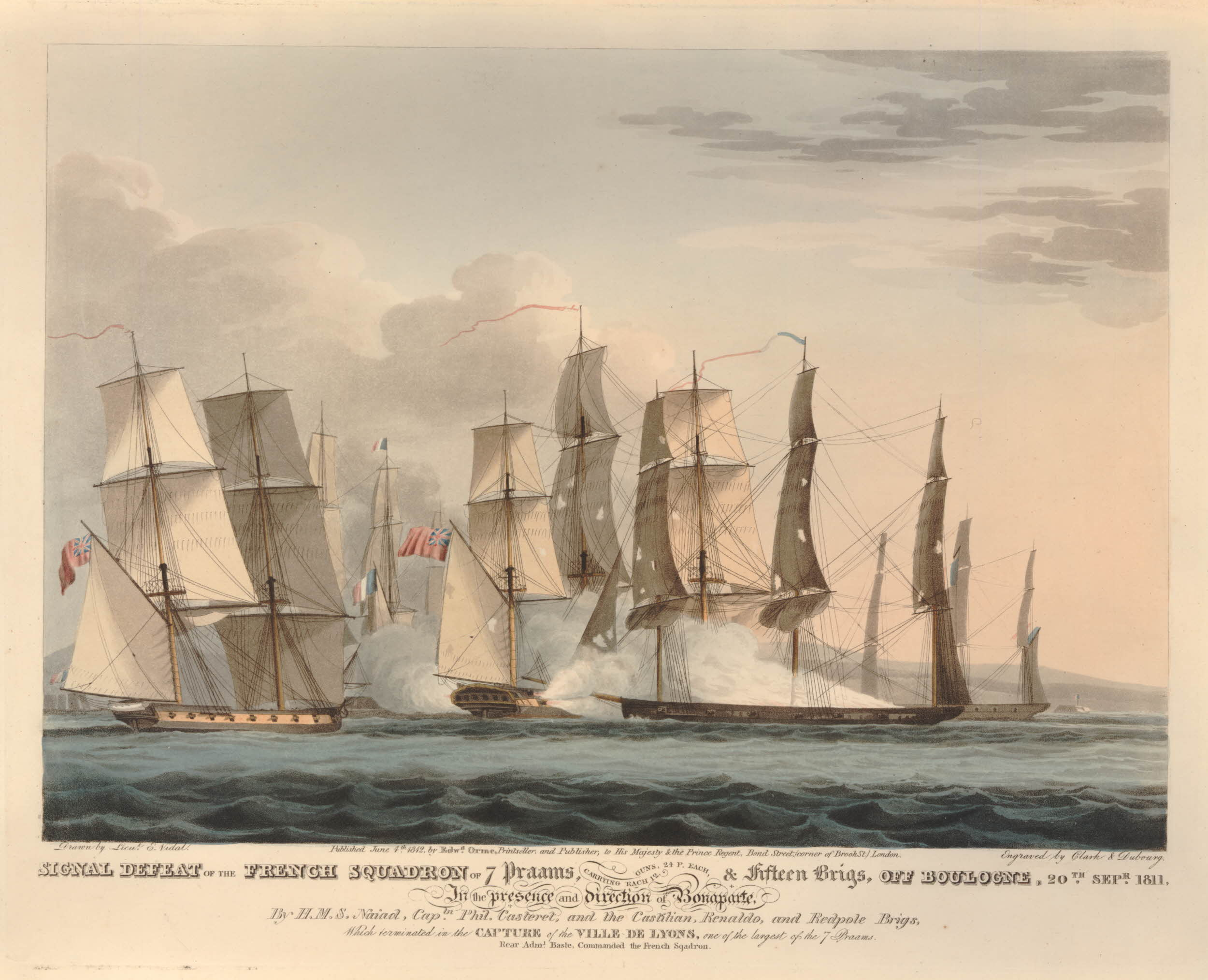
Signal Defeat of the French Squadron ... off Boulogne, 20 September 1811, as drawn by Lieut Emeric Essex Vidal

On 20 September Naiad captured the 16-gun vessel Ville de Lyon. Ville de Lyon was a praam belonging to the Boulogne Flotilla, under the command of Commodore Jean Baptiste Coupe and Captain Jean Barbaud. She was armed with twelve long 24-pounder guns and a complement of 112 men, 60 of them soldiers from the 72 Regiment. The seven praams came out again to attack Naiad and the three brigs in company with her: Redpole, Castilian and Rinaldo. The British squadron moved to engage and Naiad was able to separate Ville de Lyons from her consorts and capture her. The brigs drove off the other praams but were unable to capture any before they again took refuge under the protection of the shore batteries. In the engagement Naiad suffered two men killed and 14 wounded. Carteret estimated that the French had lost 30 to 40 men killed and wounded. Redpole had no casualties, Castilian lost her first lieutenant killed and one man wounded, and Rinaldo had her pilot wounded.

Naiad left Deal on 29 September 1811 to cruise off Boulogne. This cruise yielded two prizes. On 6 October she captured the French privateer lugger Milan in the Channel. Milan was armed with 16 guns, though only two were mounted, and had a crew of 42 men. She had left that morning from Dieppe.

A week later Naiad returned with the privateer Reinarde, which she had captured off Dieppe. On 27 October Naiad sailed again and by 6 November she had captured the French privateer lugger Requin, which she brought in a few days later. Requin was armed with two guns, and had 14 stowed in the hold. She had a crew of 58 men and was out of Boulogne.

On 12 April 1812, Carteret was in his boat sailing from Portsmouth to Lymington when it upset off Cowes. Three crewmen drowned but Carteret was picked up, exhausted, and taken to Cowes.

Naiad was paid off in Portsmouth in 1813. She was then fitted there to raise the wreck of the merchantman Queen Charlotte.

== Later career ==
From July 1814 to April 1815 Naiad underwent major repairs at Portsmouth. Captain Robert Cavendish Spencer commissioned her in April 1823 for the Channel and the Mediterranean and until August she underwent fitting for sea.

In January 1824, Naiad and Cameleon visited Algiers, following a violation of the British consul's offices, in order to demand satisfaction from the Dey. By 31 January it was apparent that British citizens living in Algiers were no longer safe so they were taken on board. On departing from the harbour, Naiad sighted the Algerine corvette Tripoli, which had recently committed depredations on Spanish trade, in contravention of the Treaty of 1816. Fire from Naiad reduced Tripoli to a wreck. A party from Cameleon boarded Tripoli before Naiad ordered them to abandon the vessel. Captain Spencer of Naiad was particularly pleased to discover that by capturing the Algerine he had liberated 17 Spaniards that were being carried into slavery.

On 18 March Naiad captured Quattro Fratelli. Cambrian shared the prize money.

Then on 23 May at Boma Naiad's boats burnt an Algerine brig of war that had sought refuge under the guns of the fortress there. The brig was armed with 16 guns, some of which had been transferred to the fort. The letter reporting the action makes no mention of casualties.

On 23 February 1825 Naiad captured Muni. Revenge shared in the prize money.

On 28 May four seamen from Naiad were drowned off the coast of Italy. Naiad's captain had a monument erected for them in the Protestant Cemetery in Rome.

In March 1826 Spencer and Naiad conducted a mission to Ibrahim Pasha, the general in command of the Ottoman forces besieging Missolonghi on the Gulf of Patras. (This was during the Third Siege of Missolonghi.) Spencer informed the Admiralty that the Ottoman forces had captured the town of Anatolica and Fort Vassiladi, and that Missolonghi would probably fall within a week. The town fell on 10 April. Spencer had thought, erroneously as it turned out, that the Ottomans would not slaughter civilian inhabitants.

Naiad left Malta for England in August and was paid off in October 1826. She then underwent a Small Repair between April and July 1828 before being laid up.

== Fate ==
In October 1846 W.I. Brown recommissioned Naiad and between July 1846 and January 1847 she served as a coal depot ship in Valparaíso, Chile. Later, she served at Callao, Peru from 1851. While at Callao she came under the command of S. Strong in December 1852 and then W.W. Dillon in December 1856. On 2 February 1866 the Admiralty sold her to the Pacific Steam Navigation Company for 2,000 dollars.

The Naval Review reported that she lasted until 1898. If so, when Naiad was broken up in 1898, she was the second longest survivor of any of the British ships at Trafalgar, after HMS Victory.
