= HMS Legere =

HMS Legere may refer to:

- HMS Legere (1797), formerly HMS Barbuda captured by France in 1782, subsequently named Legere recaptured by Great Britain in 1796 and wrecked 1801
- HMS Legere (1798), captured 1798

== See also ==
- French ship Légère
