= HMS Ethalion (1797) =

Frigate of the Royal Navy

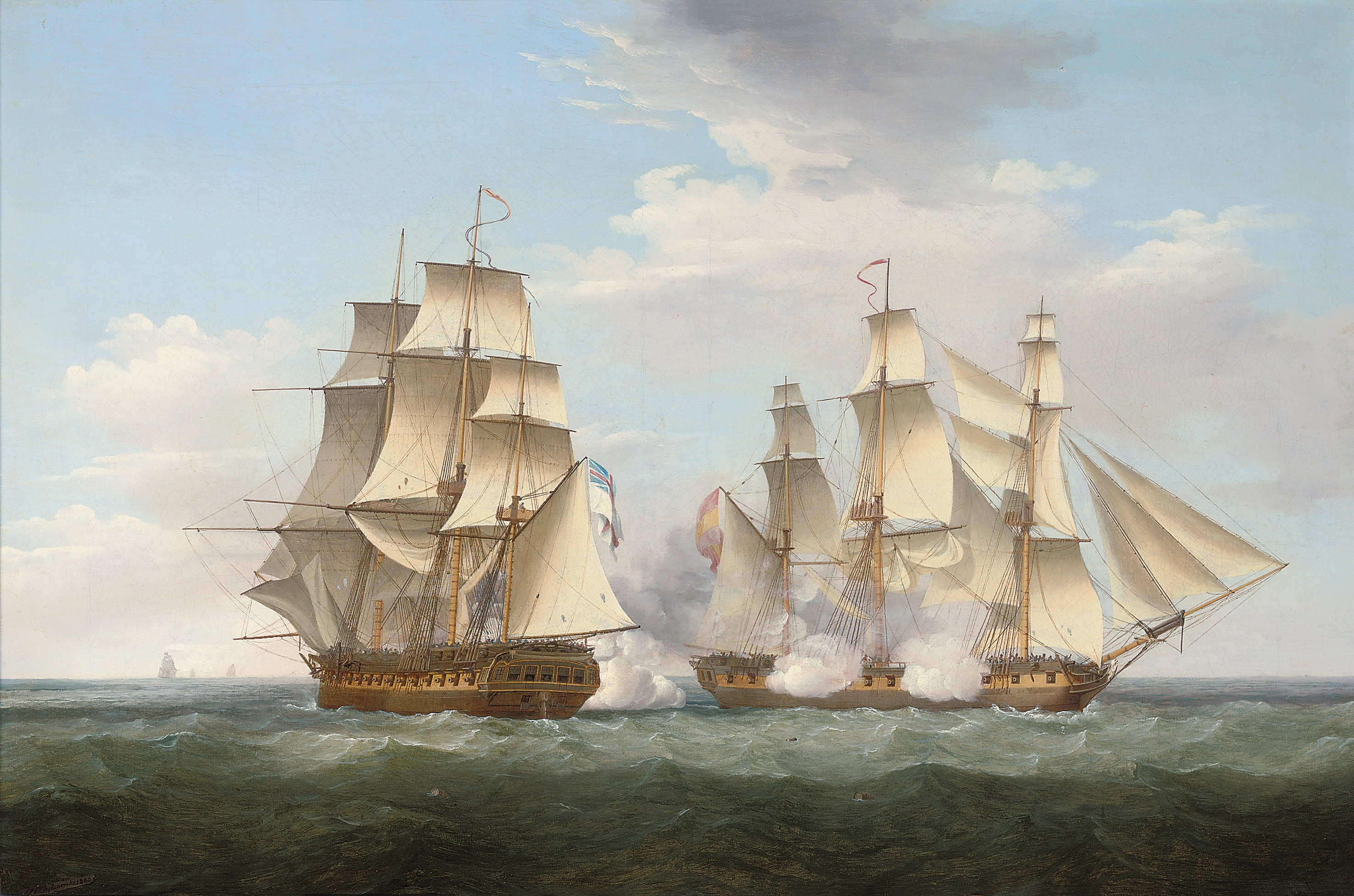
- Ethalion (left) at the action of 16 October 1799

History

United Kingdom
- Name: HMS Ethalion
- Ordered: 30 April 1795
- Builder: Graham, Harwich
- Laid down: October 1795 (named 14 November 1795)
- Launched: 14 March 1797
- Honours and awards: Naval General Service Medal with clasp "12th October 1798"
- Fate: Wrecked on 25 December 1799

General characteristics
- Class & type: 38-gun Artois-class fifth-rate frigate
- Tons burthen: 992 8/94 (bm)
- Length: 146 ft 1 in (44.5 m) (gundeck) 121 ft 7 in (37.1 m)
- Beam: 39 ft (11.89 m) (Unladen) 15 ft 0 in (4.57 m) (Laden)
- Draught: 10 ft 3 in (3.12 m)
- Depth of hold: 13 ft 9 in (4.19 m)
- Sail plan: Full-rigged ship
- Complement: 270
- Armament: Upper deck: 28 × 18-pounder guns; QD: 2 × 9-pounder guns + 12 × 32-pounder carronades; Fc: 2 × 9-pounder guns + 2 × 32-pounder carronades

HMS Ethalion was a 38-gun Artois-class fifth-rate frigate of the Royal Navy. She was built by Joseph Graham of Harwich and launched on 14 March 1797. In her brief career before she was wrecked in 1799 on the French coast, she participated in a major battle and in the capture of two privateers and a rich prize.

== Service ==
Ethalion entered service in 1797, operating in the English Channel as part of the Channel Fleet. Soon after commissioning in April under Captain George Countess, Ethalion was engaged in chasing a French squadron under Jean-Baptiste-François Bompart intent on invading Ireland during the Rebellion of 1798. Countess kept the French fleet in sight for several days and was able to signal for assistance. This brought a significant force under John Borlase Warren to the region and the French were defeated at the Battle of Tory Island. Ethalion, with Melampus, took the 40-gun Bellone, which the Royal Navy took into service. Ethalion had one man killed and three wounded; the French lost 20 men killed. In 1847 the Battle of Tory Island earned for any still surviving crew members the Naval General Service Medal with clasp "12th October 1798".

On 2 February 1799, Ethalion was operating with Anson when together they captured a 14-gun privateer Bayonnaise cutter. She was the Boulonnoise, out of Dunkirk, and had been "greatly annoyed the trade in the North Sea". She had a crew of 70 men and had been the revenue cutter Swan. Swan had been captured some two years earlier off the Isle of Wight in an action that cost the life of Captain Sarmon, her commander.

On 6 March Ethalion captured the 18-gun privateer Infatigable in the Channel after a 10-hour chase. Infatigable was armed with 18 guns and had a crew of 120 men. She was only one day out of Nantes, provisioned for a four-month cruise. (Note: The Royal Navy took Infatigable in as HMS Dispatch, which however it never fitted or commissioned. It sold her in 1801.)

Later in 1799 Captain James Young took command.

=== Capture of Thetis and Santa Brigada ===
In 1799 Ethalion was operating with four other frigates off Vera Cruz against Spanish shipping. The British frigate Naiad, Captain William Pierrepont, was patrolling off the coast of Spain when she sighted two Spanish 34-gun frigates, Santa-Brigida and Thetis on 15 October 1799. Captain Pierrepont of Naiad gave chase and before dawn Ethalion spotted them and joined the pursuit. At 7:00am the two Spaniards parted company so Pierrepont followed one frigate, together with Alcmene and Triton, which too had joined the chase, while directing Ethalion, to pursue the other frigate. By 11:30am, Ethalion had caught up with her quarry and after a short engagement the Spanish vessel struck her colours. Ethalion had no casualties though the Spaniard had one man killed and nine wounded.

Triton, the fastest of the three British frigates, led the chase of the second frigate. The next morning Triton struck some rocks as she tried to prevent her quarry from reaching port. Triton got off the rocks and resumed the chase despite taking on water. She and Alcmene then exchanged fire with the Spanish frigate, which surrendered before Naiad could catch up. Four large Spanish ships came out from Vigo but then retreated when the three British frigates made ready to engage them. Alcmene had one man killed and nine wounded, and Triton had one man wounded; Santa Brigida had two men killed and eight men wounded.

The vessel that Ethalion had captured turned out to be the Thetis, under the command of Captain-Don Juan de Mendoza. She homeward-bound from Vera Cruz with a cargo of cocoa, cochineal and sugar, and more importantly, specie worth 1,385,292 Spanish dollars (£312,000). The vessel that Triton, Alcmene and Naiad had captured was Santa Brigida, under the command of Captain Don Antonio Pillon. She was carrying a cargo of drugs, annatto, cochineal, indigo and sugar, and some 1,500,000 dollars. Prize money was paid on 14 January 1800. (Note: Each of the four British captains received £40,730 18s; each marine and sailor received £182 4s 9½d, an amount probably equal to eight or nine years' salary.)

In December Ethalion, by then under Captain John Searle, was engaged in the blockade of the French Atlantic Coast.

== Loss ==
On 25 December 1799 Ethalion was wrecked on a reef off the Penmarks. Attempts were made to save the stricken ship but the damage was too severe. Danae, Sylph, and the hired armed cutter Nimrod assisted in rescuing the crew. Ethalion's first lieutenant then set the remains on fire. Searle, the first lieutenant, and the master's mate were the last to leave. The subsequent court martial honourably acquitted Searle and his officers for the loss. The board ruled that the accident was due to unusual tides against which the skill and zeal of the officers and ship's company were unavailing.
