= Spanish frigate Santa Brigida =

Spanish Navy warship

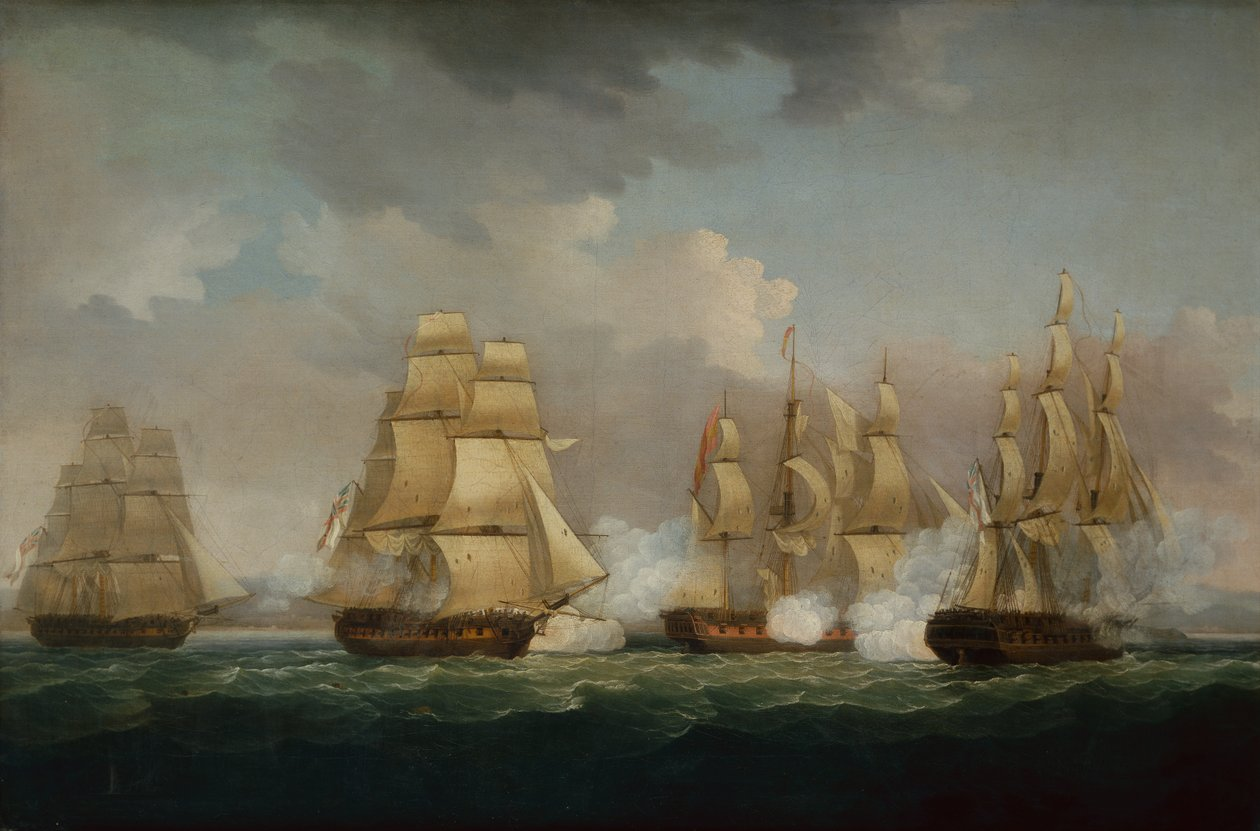
- Painting of Santa Brigade (second from right) by Thomas Whitcombe

History

Spain
- Name: Santa Brigida
- Ordered: 3 September 1782
- Builder: Cartagena, Spain
- Launched: 5 March 1785
- Captured: 18 October 1799

United Kingdom
- Name: Automatia
- Namesake: Obsolete name for Fortuna, the goddess of Chance
- Acquired: By purchase of a prize
- Fate: Broken up 1803

General characteristics
- Type: 34-gun frigate
- Tons burthen: 928, or 92893/94, or 930, or 960 (bm)
- Sail plan: Full-rigged ship
- Complement: Automatia:50
- Armament: Santa Brigida:34 guns; Automatia:24 × 24&18&12-pounder guns

Santa Brigida was a frigate of the Spanish Navy, launched in 1785. The British Royal Navy captured her in 1799. She then became the East Indiaman Automatia (or Automasia, or Automation), and made one voyage for the British East India Company (EIC). She was sold for breaking up in 1803.

== Capture ==
Santa Brigida and Thetis left Vera Cruz (Mexico) on 21 August 1799. Santa Brigada was under the command of Captain Don Antonio Pillon. She was carrying a cargo of drugs, annatto, cochineal, indigo and sugar, and some 1,500,000 Spanish dollars (£313,000). Thetis was under the command of Captain Don Juan de Mendoza and carried a cargo of cocoa, cochineal and sugar, and more importantly, specie worth 1,385,292 Spanish dollars (£312,000).

On 16 October they encountered several British frigates in position 44°01′N 12°38′W. HMS Ethalion captured Thetis. HMS Triton, Naiad, and Alcmene captured Santa Brigida after a short engagement. Santa Brigida had two men killed and eight men wounded. Prize money was paid on 14 January 1800. (Note: Each of the four British captains received £40,730 18s 0d; each marine and sailor received £182 4s 9½, an amount probably equal five to eight years' salary.)

The British considered neither vessel eligible for the Royal Navy. Their "chief and almost only value rested in the cargo they carried."

== Merchantman ==
Prinsep and Saunders purchased Santa Brigida, converted her into an East Indiaman, and renamed her Automatia (or Automasia, or Automation).

Automatia appears in the Register of Shipping for 1802 with S. Cortis, master, R. Heater, owner, and trade Plymouth-Calcutta. Captain Anthony Curtis (or Cortis), acquired a letter of marque on 8 December 1800. Messrs. Princip and Saunders had tendered Automasia, Anthony Curtis, master, to the EIC to bring back rice from Bengal. She was one of 28 vessels that sailed on that mission between December 1800 and February 1801.

Curtis sailed from Plymouth on 25 December, bound for Madras and Bengal. However, on 30 December a violent squall of the Lizard carried away Automatia's mast; HMS Defiance towed her to Falmouth. On 7 March she passed Plymouth as she sailed from Torbay to Calcutta for rice.

Automatia arrived at Madras on 23 June 1801, and Calcutta on 5 July. On 1 September she reported that she had almost completed loading her rice and that she expected to sail for Europe in a few days. Homeward bound, she was at Kedgeree on 22 September, and left there on 5 October.

On 19 October Automasia recaptured from the French the snow Friendship, of/off Vizagapatam. Lloyd's List reported on 16 March 1802 that Automasia, Curtis, master, had recaptured Friendship, Topham, master. Friendship had been sailing from Negapatam to Madras with "bale goods". Automasia sent her into Calcutta. (Note: This may have been Friendship, of 400 tons (bm), built in Rangoon.)

Automatia reached the Cape of Good Hope on 19 December. She left on 3 January 1802 and arrived at the Downs on 13 March. She reported that during her voyage, in 1801, she had sighted Slot Von Capelle Bank at 36°40′S 41°20′E.

== Fate ==
On her return from India Automatia underwent a survey preparatory to making another voyage. She was found unfit for further service and was sold in 1803 for breaking up.

The Register of Shipping continues to carry Automatia to 1805, but all data is stale. Lloyd's Register does not appear ever to have carried her.
