= Admiral Kingsmill (1798 ship) =

History

Spain
- Launched: 1786
- Captured: c.1798

Great Britain
- Name: Admiral Kingsmill
- Namesake: Sir Robert Kingsmill, 1st Baronet
- Owner: Callahan
- Acquired: c.1798 by purchase
- Fate: Captured 1799

General characteristics
- Tons burthen: 374 (bm)
- Armament: 8 guns

Admiral Kingsmill was launched in Spain in 1786 under another name, and was repaired in 1795 and 1798. She first appeared in Lloyd's Register in 1798 with J. Burke, master, Callahan, owner, and trade Cork—Martinique. Admiral Kingsmill, Burk, master, was sailing from Jamaica to London when the French privateer Courageaux captured her in April 1799.

Courageaux also captured three other vessels that month: Recovery, Mary, and Fanny. Courageaux sent her prizes into Passages; the captains were returned to Poole. The French papers reported that Mary and three other vessels from a convoy from the West Indies, prizes to Courageux, had arrived in France on 17 April.
