= Legere =

Legere or Légère are surnames. Notable people with the surnames include:

- Allan Legere (1948–2026), Canadian criminal
- Daniel Légère (1959–2024), Canadian labour leader
- Felton Legere (1913–1963), Canadian politician
- Jacqueline Legere (born 1991), Canadian ice skater
- John Legere (born 1958), American businessman
- Leroy Legere (born 1945), Canadian politician
- Marlon Legere (born 1975), American criminal
- Mary A. Legere, American military officer
- Michel Légère (born 1943), civil servant and politician
- Phoebe Legere (born 1961), American multi-disciplinary artist
- Ray Legere (born 1965), Canadian bluegrass fiddler
- Ricky Legere (born 1985), American mixed martial artist
