= Recovery (1793 ship) =

History

Great Britain
- Name: Recovery
- Builder: Liverpool
- Launched: 1793
- Fate: Foundered 10 June 1818

General characteristics
- Tons burthen: 322, or 332, or 351, or 360(bm)
- Complement: 1793:30; 1797:30
- Armament: 1793:12 × 6-pounder guns; 1797:18 × 6-pounder guns

Recovery was built at Liverpool in 1793. She was a West Indiaman that sailed under a letter of marque. The French privateer Courageaux captured her in 1799. She returned to British ownership by 1800 and continued to trade until she foundered in June 1818 on her way from Hull to Miramichi Bay.

== Career ==
Recovery appeared in Lloyd's Register in 1793 with "T. Kenop", master, Rd Watt, owner, and trade Liverpool–Jamaica.

- Captain Archibald Kennan acquired a letter of marque on 17 October 1793.

Recovery underwent repairs in 1794 for damages.

- Captain Michael Whaley acquired a letter of marque on 28 September 1797.

Lloyd's Register for 1799 showed Recovery with T. Phillips, master, Walker & Co., owners, and trade Liverpool–Jamaica.

Recovery, Phillips, master, was sailing from Jamaica to Liverpool when Courageaux captured her in April 1799. Courageaux also captured three other vessels that month: Admiral Kingsmill, Mary, and Fanny. Courageaux sent her prizes into Passages; the captains were returned to Poole. The French papers reported that Mary and three other vessels from a convoy from the West Indies, prizes to Courageux, had arrived in France on the 17th of April.

In a process that is currently obscure, Recovery returned to British ownership. LR for 1800 showed Recovery, of 332 tons (bm), built at Liverpool in 1793, with Abercrombie, master, Young & Co., owners, and trade London–Tobago. LL for 24 June 1800 reported that Recovery, Abercromby, master, had run onshore at Tobago while sailing for London. A small part of her cargo had been saved. However, Recovery was repaired and returned to service.

Year	Master	Owner	Trade	Source & notes
1801	Abercrombie; Watson	Young & Co. Captain & Co.	London–Tobago	LR; Damages repaired 1800
1805	J.Taylor	Wilson & Co.	London–Tobago	LR; Damages repaired 1800
1810	J.Lamb; Hawkins	Wilson & Co.	London–Tobago	LR; Damages repaired 1800

On 30 December 1810 Recovery, Hawkins, master, put into Portsmouth leaky; she was to be docked for examination and repairs. She was on her way to Jamaica.

Year	Master	Owner	Trade	Source & notes
1812	Hawkins; Bentley	Moxon & Co.	London–Jamaica; Hull–Cadiz	LR; raised and thorough repair 1812; damages repaired 1800
1815	Beattie	Moxon & Co.	London–Jamaica	LR; raised and thorough repair 1812; small repairs 1813; damages repaired 1814
1815	W.Draper	Moxon	London–Baltic	LR; damages and thorough repair 1815

Recovery was condemned in 1815. However, she underwent a thorough repair and repair of damages. The supplemental pages in LR for 1815 show her with W.Draper, master, Moxon, owner, and trade London-Baltic.

Year	Master	Owner	Trade	Source & notes
1818	F.Hornby	Moxon	Hull–Petersburg	LR; thorough repair 1815

On 6 June 1817 Recovery, Hornby, master, arrived at Petersburg from Hull. By 25 August she arrived back at Hull from Petersburg. By 29 September she was at Petersburg again.

== Loss ==
On 10 June 1818 Recovery, of Hull, Biggins, master, Moxon, owner, foundered. She struck a big piece of ice in the Gulf of Saint Lawrence off the Magdalen Islands. Middleton rescued her 16 crew. Recovery was on a voyage to Hull to Miramichi Bay.
