= Automatic system recovery =

Process that detects a computer failure and attempts recovery

Automatic system recovery is a device or process that detects a computer failure and attempts recovery. The device may make use of a Watchdog timer. This may also refer to a Microsoft recovery technology by the same name.
