= French ship Infatigable (1798) =

History

France
- Name: Infatigable
- Builder: Nantes
- Launched: 1798
- Captured: 6 March 1799

Great Britain
- Name: HMS Dispatch
- Acquired: 1799 by purchase of a prize
- Fate: Sold 7 September 1801

General characteristics
- Tons burthen: 200,(French; "of load") or 23762/94, or 238 (bm)
- Length: Overall: 90 ft 4 in (27.5 m); Keel: 71 ft 0 7/8 in (21.7 m)
- Beam: 25 ft 0 7/8 in (7.6 m)
- Depth of hold: 11 ft 3 in (3.4 m)
- Complement: Privateer: 120; RN:90
- Armament: Privateer: 18 guns; RN: 16 × 18-pounder carronades + 2 × 6-pounder chase guns

The French ship Infatigable was launched in 1798 at Nantes. She became a privateer that the British Royal Navy captured in 1799 and named HMS Dispatch. The Navy never commissioned Dispatch and sold her in 1801.

Infatigable was commissioned in December 1798 with 120 men and 18 guns.

On 6 March 1799 HMS Ethalion captured the 18-gun privateer Infatigable in the Channel after a 10-hour chase. Infatigable was armed with 18 guns and had a crew of 120 men. She was only one day out of Nantes, provisioned for a four-month cruise. "Indefatigable" arrived at Portsmouth on 25 March and was laid up.

The "Principal officers and commissioners of His Majesty's Navy" offered Dispatch for sale on 24 August 1801. She sold on 7 September for £765.
