= HMS Dover Prize (1693) =

Frigate of the Royal Navy

History

England
- Name: HMS Dover Prize
- Captured: 1693
- Fate: Sold in 1697

General characteristics
- Class & type: 32-gun fifth rate
- Tons burthen: 330 tons
- Length: 105 ft (32 m) (gundeck)
- Beam: 27 ft (8.2 m)
- Propulsion: Sails
- Sail plan: Full-rigged ship

HMS Dover Prize was a 32-gun fifth rate of the Royal Navy.

She was previously the French frigate Legere launched in 1682, carrying between 20 and 24 guns. She was captured in 1693 by HMS Dover, carrying 48 guns and taken into the Royal Navy, under the name Dover Prize. She was then refitted with 32 guns, and remained in the Navy until 1698, when she was sold.
