= William Pierrepont (Royal Navy officer) =

Rear-Admiral William Pierrepont
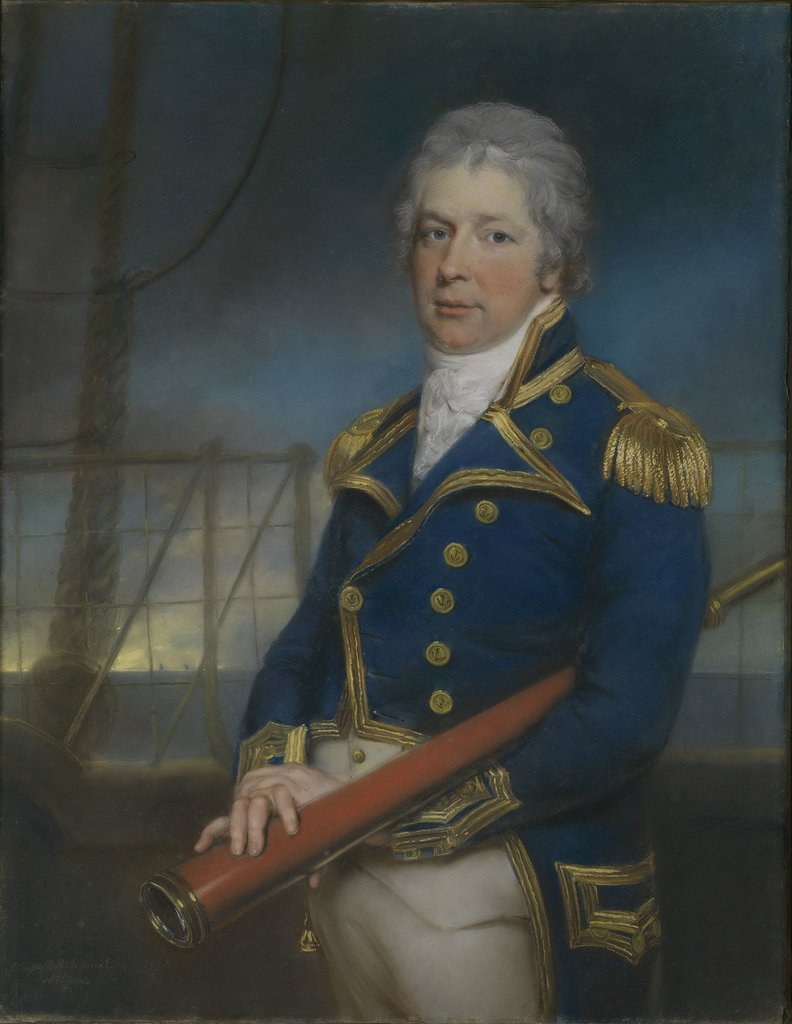
- 1801 portrait of Pierrepont by John Russell
- Born: March 1766; Uffington, Lincolnshire
- Died: 7 August 1813 (aged 47); Bramley, Surrey
- Military career
- Allegiance: Great Britain; United Kingdom
- Branch: Royal Navy
- Service years: 1780s–1813
- Rank: Rear-Admiral
- Conflicts: French Revolutionary Wars; Action of 16 October 1799; Napoleonic Wars

Rear-Admiral William Pierrepont (March 1766 – 7 August 1813) was a Royal Navy officer who is best known for his service in the French Revolutionary Wars as a commander of the frigate HMS Naiad, in which he commanded the British squadron at the action of 16 October 1799 off Vigo, in which one of the largest hauls of prize money ever captured was distributed following the seizure of a Spanish treasure convoy. Pierrepont's career was later hindered by poor health, although he served in large warships through much of the Napoleonic Wars.

== Life ==
Pierrepont was born in March 1766 to Charles and Mary Pierrepont of Uffington in Lincolnshire. He joined the Royal Navy in the 1780s and was commissioned as a lieutenant in 1789, serving on HMS Leander, HMS Inconstant and HMS Boyne. On the latter, he participated in Sir John Jervis's 1794 campaign in the West Indies at the start of the French Revolutionary Wars and was promoted to command the cutter HMS Seaflower, subsequently being promoted to commander and then post captain.

During 1795–1796 Pierrepont commanded the frigates HMS Brilliant and HMS Blonde before taking over the newly built HMS Naiad in 1797. It was in Naiad that he achieved a number of successes against French privateers and small warships, including the capture of the en flute frigate Decade in 1798. In October 1799, while patrolling off Cape Finisterre, Pierrepont spotted and chased two Spanish ships, and although Naiad was unable to catch either one, other patrolling frigates, acting under Pierrepont's direction, were able to bring the Spanish force to battle and defeat it at the action of 16 October 1799. On board was found a cargo of more than two million silver dollars, worth at least £618,040 (the equivalent of £62,058,000 as of 2025). Pierrepont's share of this wealth was £40,730, the equivalent of £4,022,330 as of 2025.

Ill health forced a temporary retirement in 1800, although he saw shore service in 1803 and returned to sea in 1807 as captain of HMS Zealous. He married in 1797 and had five children at his stately home of Farley Hill near Godalming in Surrey, where he died aged 46 in August 1813, less than a year after his promotion to rear-admiral.
