= Admiral Kingsmill (1796 ship) =

History

Great Britain
- Name: Admiral Kingsmill
- Namesake: Sir Robert Kingsmill, 1st Baronet
- Owner: 1797:J. Roche; 1798:Penny & Co.
- Acquired: 1796
- Fate: Captured 1799

General characteristics
- Type: Brig
- Tons burthen: 120, or 139, or 160 (bm)
- Propulsion: Sail
- Complement: 50
- Armament: 10 × 4&6-pounder guns
- Notes: Tin sheathing

Admiral Kingsmill appeared in Lloyd's Register for 1797 as a British clinker-built and Cork-based privateer. The entry showed her master as Thornton. She had undergone repairs in 1796 and was armed with ten 6-pounder guns. Captain Eleazer Thornton acquired a letter of marque for Admiral Kingsmill on 19 December 1796. Lloyd's Register for 1798 described her as a tin-sheathed brig. It gave her burthen as 160 tons and her trade as Liverpool-Africa, indicating that she was probably a slave ship.

A database of slave-trading voyages showed her master as Hugh Kessick, and her owners as James Penny, James Penny, Jr., Moses Benson, and John Backhouse. She left Liverpool on 8 June 1797 and gathered her slaves from West Central Africa. Admiral Kingsmill delivered 263 slaves to Martinique on 20 March 1798.

Admiral Kingsmill was last listed in Lloyd's Register and the Register of Shipping in 1800.
