= French gunboat Légère (1794) =

Légère
History

France
- Name: Légère
- Launched
- Commissioned: June 1794 at Toulon
- Captured: August 1798

United Kingdom
- Name: Legere
- Acquired: August 1798 by capture
- Fate: Disposed of by 1803

General characteristics
- Sail plan: Felucca
- Complement: 20 (originally)
- Armament: Originally: 1 × 6-pounder gun + 10 swivel guns; At capture: 2 × 6-pounder guns + swivel guns; British service: 6 guns

The French gunboat Légère was a felucca that the French Navy commissioned in August 1794 at Toulon. The Royal Navy captured her in September 1798 and took her into service as HMS Legere. The Royal Navy disposed of her by 1803.

== Capture ==
On 22 August HMS Alcmene captured Légère, of two 6-pounder guns and some swivel guns, and 61 men, off Alexandria. Captain George Johnstone Hope of Alcmene tried to board her before her captain could throw overboard any dispatches she was carrying for Napoleon Bonaparte, then in Egypt. Hope was unsuccessful, but two seamen from Alcmene's crew jumped overboard and were able to retrieve the dispatches before they sank. One of Alcemene's boats was able to rescue the intrepid seamen. At the time of her capture, Légère had been 40 days out of Toulon. The Royal Navy took the gunboat into service as HMS Legere

== Royal Navy service and fate ==
There is no record that Legere was ever commissioned. However, in 1799 she was under the command of Lieutenant George Langford. She was still under his command on 11 September 1800, and serving on the Lisbon, Gibraltar, and Mediterranean station. She was in service in the Mediterranean in 1801, but was disposed of by 1803.
