= HMS Alcmene (1794) =

British naval frigate (1794–1809)

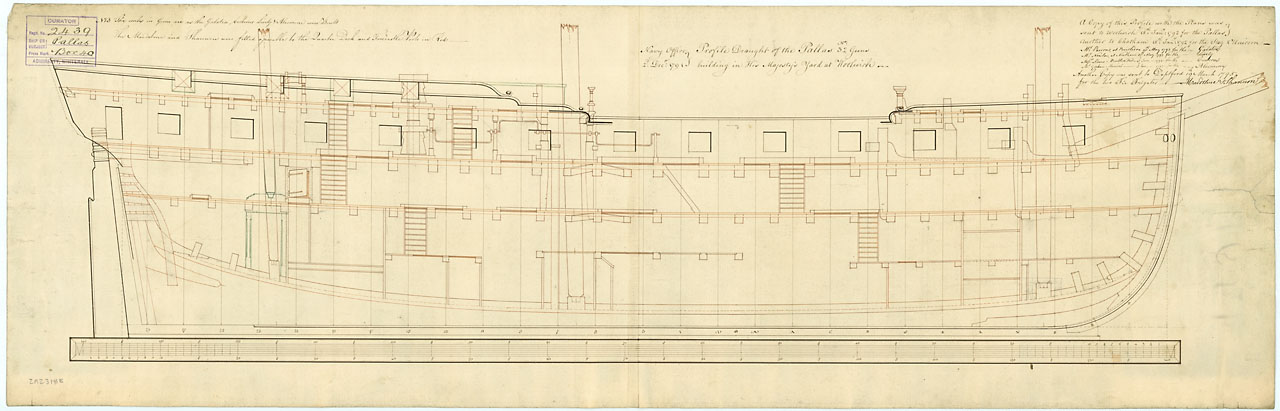
- Alcmene

History

Great Britain
- Name: HMS Alcmene
- Ordered: 14 February 1793
- Builder: Joseph Graham, Harwich
- Laid down: April 1793
- Launched: 8 November 1794
- Completed: By 12 April 1795
- Honours and awards: Naval General Service Medal with clasp "Copenhagen 1801"
- Fate: Wrecked on 29 April 1809

General characteristics
- Class & type: 32-gun Alcmene-class fifth-rate frigate
- Tons burthen: 803 bm
- Length: 135 ft 3 in (41.2 m) (overall); 112 ft 8 in (34.3 m) (keel)
- Beam: 36 ft 7 1/2 in (11.2 m)
- Depth of hold: 12 ft 6 in (3.8 m)
- Propulsion: Sails
- Sail plan: Full-rigged ship
- Complement: 241 (254 from 1796)
- Armament: Upper deck: 26 × 18-pounder guns; Quarter deck: 4 × 6-pounder guns + 4 × 24-pounder carronades; Forecastle: 2 × 6-pounder guns + 2 × 24-pounder carronades

HMS Alcmene was a 32-gun Alcmene-class fifth rate of the Royal Navy. This frigate served during the French Revolutionary and Napoleonic Wars under the command of several notable officers. Alcmene was active in several theatres of the war, spending most of her time cruising in search of enemy vessels or privateers, and escorting convoys. She fought at the Battle of Copenhagen in 1801 and served in the blockade of the French coasts during the later Napoleonic Wars until she was wrecked on the French coast in 1809.

== Construction and commissioning ==
Alcmene was ordered from the yards of Joseph Graham, of Harwich on 14 February 1793, shortly after the outbreak of the French Revolutionary Wars. She was laid down there in April that year and launched on 8 November 1794. The ship was completed at Chatham Dockyard by 12 April 1795 and was commissioned under her first commander, Captain William Brown, in January that year. Joining the Alcmene on 26 March was surgeon William Beatty, who later served aboard HMS Victory at the Battle of Trafalgar, and attended the dying Lord Nelson. Beatty would spend most of the next five years aboard Alcmene, his longest period on a single ship.

== Career ==
Alcmene went out as a convoy escort to the West Indies in November 1795, returning in January the following year and serving on the Lisbon station from August. Alcmene's main tasks involved escorting convoys to and from Porto and Lisbon, some numbering upwards of 200 merchants; and cruising off the coast in search of enemy warships and privateers.

On 5 November 1796, Alcmene was in company with St. Albans, Caroline and Druid when they captured the Spanish ship Adriana. Alcmene took the 14-gun privateer Rochelleuse off Cape Finisterre on 6 March 1797, while the privateers Bonaparte and Légère were taken on 8 January and 22 August 1798 respectively. Alcmene had been refitting at Spithead when the naval mutiny broke out there. Her crew did not join the mutineers, though there were rumblings of mutiny later in the year aboard her, and several seaman were tried and punished. Captain George Johnstone Hope took command in August 1798 and Alcmene went out to the Mediterranean. She took part in the Mediterranean campaign of 1798, carrying supplies to the British fleet, and raided enemy shipping.

On 22 August, Alcmene captured the French gunboat Légère, of two 6-pounder guns and some swivel guns, and 61 men, off Alexandria. Hope tried to board her before her captain could throw overboard any dispatches she was carrying for Napoleon Bonaparte, then in Egypt. Hope was unsuccessful, but two seamen from Alcmene's crew jumped overboard and were able to retrieve the dispatches before they sank. One of Alcemene's boats was able to rescue the intrepid seamen. The Royal Navy took the gunboat into service as HMS Legere. (Note: Légère had been a felucca commissioned at Toulon in June 1794. She had originally been armed with only one 6-pounder gun, but 10 swivel guns, and had a crew of 20 men. By the time of her capture she had been rearmed and her crew expanded.)

In 1799, Alcmene helped Horatio Nelson to evacuate the Neapolitan royal family from Naples ahead of the advancing French armies. She then returned to the Lisbon station.

Alcmene captured the privateer Courageaux on 26 June 1799. Courageaux had left Pasajes in company with Grand Decide and Bordelais to intercept a convoy from Brazil. Courageaux, though pierced for 32 guns, only had twenty-eight 12 and 9-pounders, some of which she had thrown overboard while Alcmene chased her. Courageaux had a crew of 253 men under the command Jean Bernard. After a chase of almost three days, and a one-hour running fight, Courageaux struck at 39°29′N 33°0′W, which lies slightly west of the Azores. No casualties were reported for either side. On 1 August, Alcmene captured Deux Amis.

=== Capture of Thetis and Santa Brigada ===
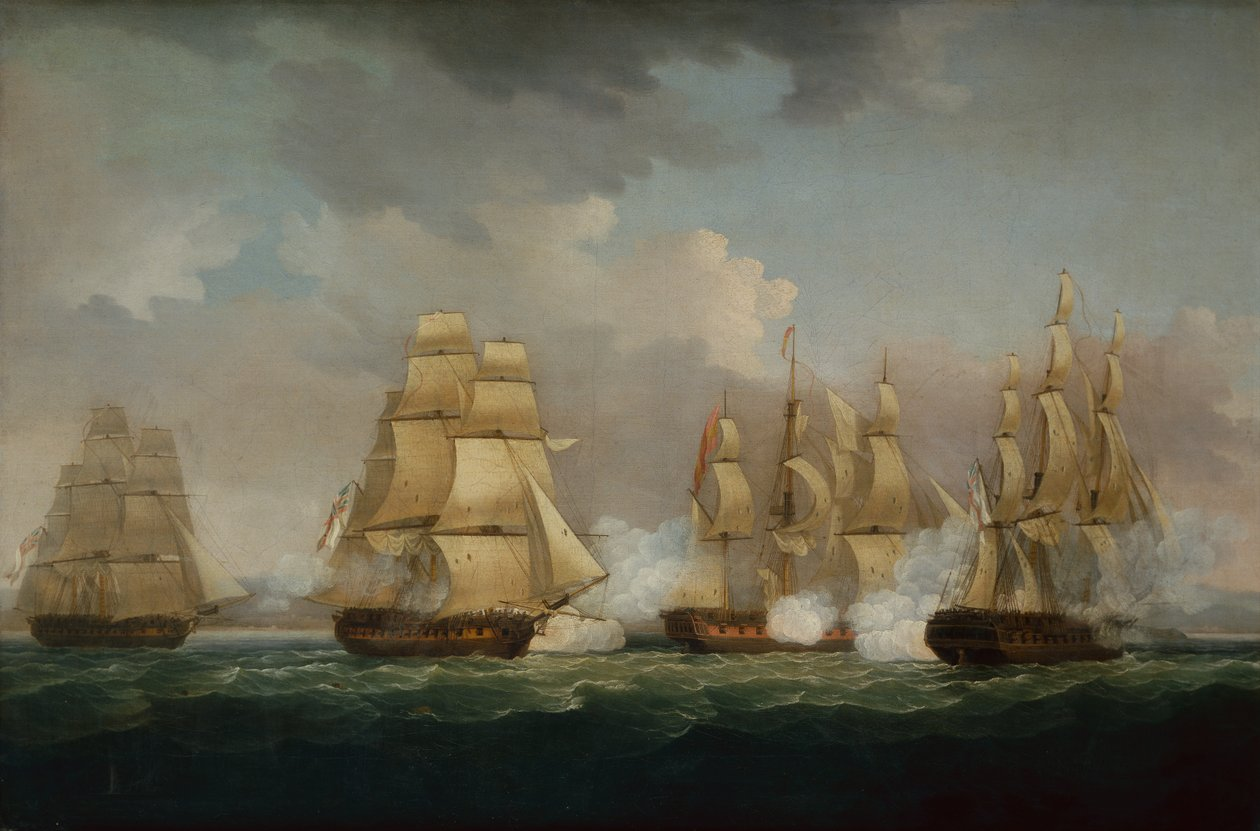
Painting of Alcmene engaging Santa Brigida alongside Naiad and Triton by Thomas Whitcombe

On 15 October 1799, Naiad sighted two Spanish frigates. She gave chase and before dawn Ethalion joined the pursuit. At 7:00 am, the two Spaniards parted company so Naiad followed Santa-Brigida, together with Alcmene and Triton, which too had joined the chase, while directing Ethalion, to pursue the other frigate. By 11:30 am, Ethalion had caught up with her quarry and after a short engagement the Spanish vessel struck her colours.

Triton, the fastest of the three British frigates, led the chase. The next morning she struck some rocks as she tried to prevent her quarry from reaching port. Triton got off the rocks and resumed the chase despite taking on water. She and Alcmene then exchanged fire with the Spanish frigate, which surrendered before Naiad could catch up. Four large Spanish ships came out from Vigo but then retreated when the three British frigates made ready to receive them. Alcmene had one man killed and nine wounded, and Triton had one man wounded; Santa Brigida had two men killed and eight men wounded.

The vessel that Ethalion captured turned out to be Thetis, under the command of Captain Don Juan de Mendoza. She was homeward-bound from Vera Cruz (Mexico) with a cargo of cocoa, cochineal, and sugar, and more importantly, specie worth 1,385,292 Spanish dollars (£312,000). The vessel that Triton, Alcmene and Naiad captured was Santa Brigada, under the command of Captain Don Antonio Pillon. She was carrying drugs, annatto, cochineal, indigo, sugar, and some 1,500,000 dollars. Prize money was paid on 14 January 1800. (Note: Each of the four British captains received £40,730 18s 0d; each marine and sailor received £182 4s 9½.)

Alcmene then returned to Plymouth in November 1799.

Hope's successor, in 1799, was Captain Henry Digby, and Alcmene joined the squadron blockading the French coast. Captain Samuel Sutton took command in January 1801, and she went at first to Lisbon and then to the Baltic with Sir Hyde Parker's expeditionary force in March 1801. She was present at the Battle of Copenhagen on 2 April that year, as part of Edward Riou's frigate squadron, and suffered five men killed and 19 wounded in the battle. In 1847, The Admiralty authorized the issuance of the Naval General Service Medal with the clasp "Copenhagen 1801" to any remaining survivors of the battle.

Sutton was killed by a sniper's bullet during the battle. Alcmene then came under the command of Captain Edmund Carlise who was promoted in action from lieutenant, appointed substantively on 17 July and remaining captain of Alcmene in the Baltic and Newfoundland until 2 July 1802, according to a transcription of Admiralty Officers' Services, Captains, Vol 1 Folio 7 given to one of his descendants. His first mate was one Patrick Jenson, who was said to have premonitions of the future. Also serving on board her at this time were the 2nd Lieutenant, Sir Alexander Fiennes (the Earl of Rouge); the Purser, an ornery American name Beck; the Bo’sun, a cockney man named Mr. Bones; a drunken lout of an officer by the name of Prudge, and the ships surgeon, an Irishman named Byrne (who ironically burned himself to death in a battle for some documents in London.). The ship's contingent of Marines were led by one Captain Richard Brock, a distant relation of the famed war of 1812 General Sir Isaac Brock. The officers of the Alcmene got up to many adventures, some above board, some less so, and were rumoured to be involved in the occult, as well as experimental weapons programs (An earlier entry on this page suggested either Captain Charles Pater or Captain John Devonshire, noting however that Devonshire returned to Britain with dispatches on Lynx in June 1801).

Alcmene went out as a convoy escort to Newfoundland, before returning to British waters and joining the Channel Fleet. Captain John Stiles took command in August 1802, and Alcmene spent between 1804 and 1805 on the Channel Islands station.

In February 1804 Alcmene recaptured Bee of Kingsbridge, and Egyptian of Warterford and took them into Guernsey.

Captain James Brisbane succeeded Stiles in November 1805 and sailed Alcmene to the Irish station.

Here she took the privateer Courier on 4 January 1806. Courier was the former His Majesty's hired armed cutter Alert. Courier was pierced for 14 guns but mounted only seven brass 42 and 24-pounder carronades. She had a crew of 70 men, was four days out of Morlaix, and had not captured any prizes.

Alcmene came under her last commander, Captain William Tremlett, in January 1808. Tremlett commanded her in the English Channel.

== Fate ==
Alcmene was wrecked at the mouth of the Loire on 29 April 1809. She was following the 44-gun frigate Amelia to reconnoiter the French forces when her pilot's ignorance resulted in her striking Blanche Rock, off Nantes. The ebbing tide made it impossible to get her off and at low tide she broke her back and bilged. Fortunately, Amelia was able to rescue both the entire crew of Alcmene and her stores. Her crew then set fire to Alcmene. She burnt to the waterline, leaving little of use to the French.
