= Courageaux (1798 ship) =

History

France
- Name: Courageaux
- Commissioned: 1798
- Captured: 1799

Great Britain
- Name: HMS Lutine
- Acquired: 1799 by capture
- Fate: Sold 1802

General characteristics
- Displacement: 420 tons (French)
- Tons burthen: 329 (bm)
- Complement: Privateer:200–250; Royal Navy:121
- Armament: 28 × 8&6-pounder guns (privateer)

Courageaux was commissioned in Bordeaux in 1798. She made two cruises as a privateer before HMS Alcmene captured her in 1799. The British Royal Navy took her into service as HMS Lutine. She had a brief operational life in the Royal Navy, serving primarily as a prison ship. At the end of the French Revolutionary Wars in 1802, the Royal Navy sold her in the Mediterranean.

== Privateer ==
Courageaux made her first cruise under Captain Beck. She was armed with 26 guns and had a crew of 29 officers and 179 to 187 men and 26 guns. The cruise lasted until April 1799.

On 7 April, Courageaux captured Fox, which had been sailing from Charleston to Bilbao.

On Courageaux's second cruise, Captain Jean Barnard had a crew of 253 men and 28 guns.

Courageaux, of 28 guns and 214 men, captured four vessels in April 1799:

- Admiral Kingsmill, Burk, master, sailing from Jamaica to London;
- Recovery, Phillips, master, sailing from Jamaica to Liverpool;
- Mary, Parsons, master, sailing to Charleston;
- Fanny, Hacket, master, of Whitehaven.

Courageaux sent her prizes into Passages. The captains were returned to Poole. The French papers reported that Mary and three other vessels from a convoy from the West Indies, prizes to Courageux, had arrived in France on 17 April.

== Capture ==
HMS Alcmene captured Courageux on 26 June 1799. Courageaux had left Pasajes in company with Grand Decide and Bordelais to intercept a convoy from Brazil. Courageaux, though pierced for 32 guns, only had twenty-eight 12 and 9-pounders, some of which she had thrown overboard while Alcmene chased her. Courageaux had a crew of 253 men under the command Jean Bernard. After a chase of almost three days, and a one-hour running fight, Courageaux struck at 39°29′N 33°0′W, which lies slightly west of the Azores. No casualties were reported for either side. Courageux came into Lisbon.

== Royal Navy ==
French, and British sources, agree that the Royal Navy commissioned Courageux as the sloop HMS Lutine. (The earlier HMS Lutine had just been lost in October.) She was commissioned in December 1799, under Commander Thomas Richbell. In 1800 or 1801, Commander James Murray Northey replaced Richbell. At the time she was already a prison ship at Minorca. Lieutenant Archibald Duff replaced Northey. She was sold by Admiralty Order on 9 April 1802, for breaking up following the Treaty of Amiens.

== Note ==
A few weeks before Alcmene captured Courageux, HMS Centaur captured the French frigate Courageuse, which the Royal Navy took into service at Malta. The coincidence of two prizes with almost identical names being at the same place at the same time and both being taken into the Royal Navy in the theatre has resulted in some confusion of the vessels. The capture on 29 March 1800, of a Courageux that was taken into Minorca, and the existence of a French naval brig named Courageux, whose listing at Toulon was struck in 1800, only adds to the confusion.
