= Action of 8 March 1795 =

- Part of the French Revolutionary Wars
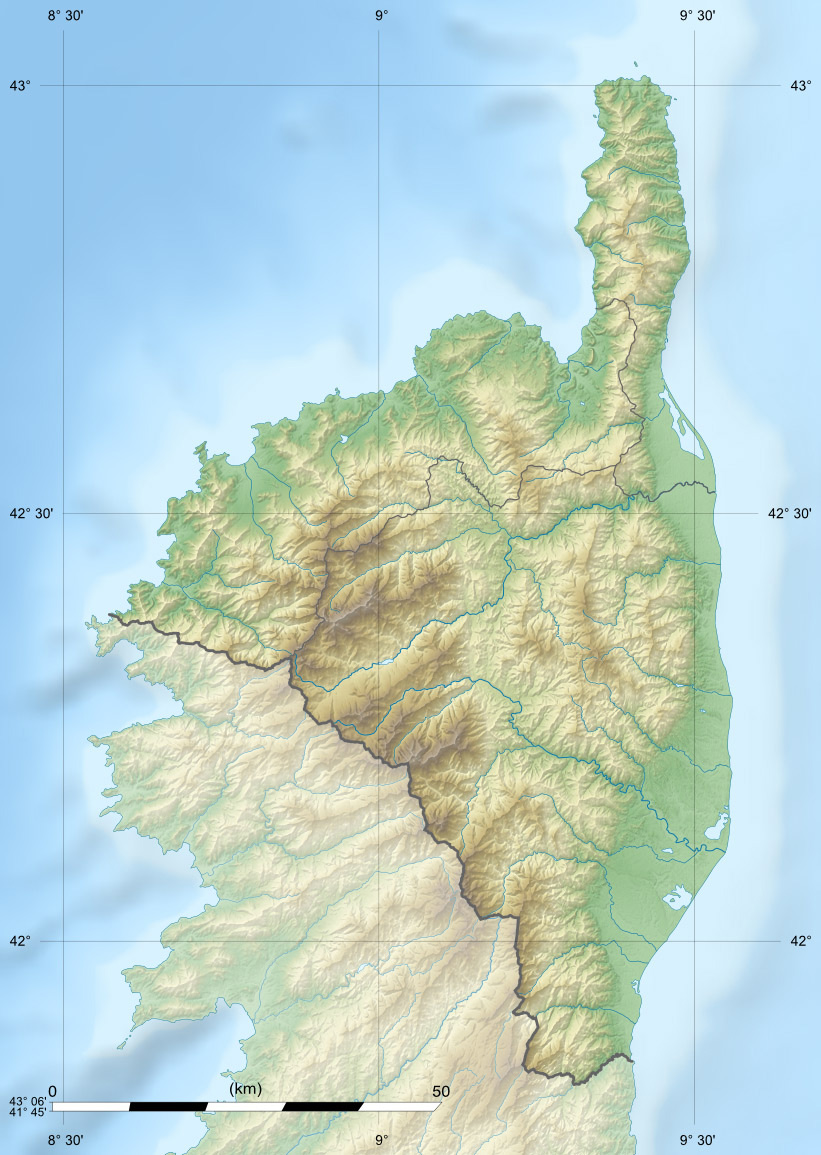
- Approximate region of location of battle
Date	8 March 1795
Location	Off Cap Corse, Ligurian Sea
Result	French victory

Belligerents
France	Great Britain

Commanders and leaders
Louis Lejoille	Adam Littlejohn †

Strength
1 frigate, supported by French Mediterranean Fleet	1 ship of the line

Casualties and losses
8 wounded	1 killed, 4 wounded 1 ship of the line captured

The action of 8 March 1795 was a minor naval engagement in the Mediterranean theatre of the French Revolutionary Wars. The action was part of series of battles fought in the spring of 1795 between British and French fleets for control of the Ligurian Sea and thus the blockade of the French naval base of Toulon. The engagement was the first significant action of the year and was fought principally between the damaged British 74-gun ship of the line HMS Berwick and the French 32-gun frigate Alceste, with the later assistance of the frigate Vestale and the 74-gun Duquesne, distantly supported by the rest of the French Mediterranean Fleet.

The action took place against the backdrop of a wider campaign, in which much of the French fleet had been badly damaged in 1793 during the Siege of Toulon. Freshly repaired, the French had sailed on a mission to intimidate the neutral city of Genoa and possibly invade British-held Corsica. The British fleet had until recently been anchored for the winter in San Fiorenzo Bay off Northern Corsica, but Vice-Admiral William Hotham sailed for Leghorn for refit in late February and left behind Berwick, which had been badly damaged in an accident over the winter. Equipped with the rigging of a frigate and mounting only 64-guns, Captain Adam Littlejohn was under orders to follow the fleet when practical, but in doing so in early March he ran straight into Contre-amiral Pierre Martin's French fleet. Two French ships of the line and three frigates sailed to intercept Berwick, and the frigate Alceste arrived first; most of the action took place between the disabled British ship and the French frigate.

Littlejohn was killed after an hour's combat, and the inability of the British ship to manoeuvre, the arrival of a second frigate, and the looming presence of the larger French detachment in pursuit convinced the surviving British officers that resistance was futile. Berwick was surrendered and taken first to Gourjean Bay and later to Toulon. The ship served with the French Navy for ten years, before being recaptured at the Battle of Trafalgar. Martin's fleet was intercepted by Hotham's a few days later in the Gulf of Genoa, and at the ensuing battle two French ships were lost.

== Background ==
The Mediterranean campaign of the French Revolutionary Wars began in earnest in August 1793, seven months after war was declared, with the arrival of a powerful British fleet under Vice-Admiral Lord Hood. Hood was immediately able to take advantage of the political chaos of the Reign of Terror then underway in the new French Republic and force the French naval base of Toulon to declare for the Royalist cause and permit Hood to occupy the city and seize almost the entire French fleet at anchor in the harbour. Republican forces besieged the city and after four months it was recaptured, Hood burning the French fleet as he left. Despite Hood's orders however only half the fleet was lost, many ships surviving in a damaged state; the French began an extensive programme of repairs. As the French salvaged their fleet, Hood ordered an invasion of Corsica in February 1794. French garrisons on the island were eliminated one by one in a series of sieges, and by August the island and its important anchorage at San Fiorenzo Bay, were under British control. The repaired French fleet, under the command of Contre-amiral Pierre Martin, sailed from Toulon in June 1794 on a limited cruise, and was almost caught by Hood; Martin's ships were forced to shelter under gun batteries in Gourjean Bay until Hood departed. The French fleet sheltered in Toulon over the winter.

In San Fiorenzo Bay, the British fleet had an eventful winter; Hood was recalled to Britain, leaving his deputy Vice-Admiral William Hotham in command, and there was a mutiny aboard the 98-gun HMS Windsor Castle. Hotham was a cautious and elderly officer, who had ordered limited refits of his ships during their time in the Bay. On 15 January a gale swept the bay, causing a heavy cross-swell rocking the anchored fleet. One ship however, the 74-gun ship of the line HMS Berwick had had its rigging removed for the refit, leaving the masts unsupported and as a result destabilising the entire ship. Rocking dangerously, Berwick lost all three lower masts overboard. The masts could not be replaced in San Fiorenzo, and Hotham convened an immediate court-martial which found that Captain William Smith, the first lieutenant and the ship's master had not taken the proper precautions to secure the masts. All three were pronounced guilty of negligence and dismissed from the ship. Smith was replaced with Captain Adam Littlejohn, who was instructed to raise frigate jury masts, the only ones available, on Berwick.

Hotham then sailed to Leghorn, leaving Littlejohn behind with instructions for Berwick to follow when repairs were complete. Littlejohn raised the jury masts, but was forced to dismount a number of guns to improve stability. Delayed by contrary winds, Berwick, with an improvised sail rig, was only able to follow Hotham on 7 March, steering north out of San Fiorenzo Bay. Four days earlier, upon learning of Hotham's absence, Martin had sailed once more with the French fleet. His force comprised fifteen ships of the line, including one of 120-guns, two of 80-guns and the remainder of 74-guns, supported by seven frigates and five smaller warships. On board his flagship was a Représentant en mission from the National Convention, Étienne-François Letourneur, sent to provide political oversight for the operation. Martin's mission has never been adequately determined: The report of the Committee of Public Safety to the National Convention states that the fleet was at sea to secure shipping lines in the Mediterranean, although a possible amphibious landing in Corsica is mentioned in Letourneur's correspondence and indicated by the numbers of troopships assembling in Toulon. However these forces did not leave Toulon harbour, and historian Adolphe Thiers has suggested that the objective may have been a demonstration of force against Rome, following the lynching of French ambassador Nicolas Bassville there two years earlier.

== Battle ==
Regardless of their purpose, the French fleet, delayed by the same winds which had held back Littlejohn, arrived off Northern Corsica in the early morning of 8 March. Martin had sent frigates to scout his advance, and it was one of these that spied the disabled Berwick limping northwards along the coast at 07:00. Littlejohn's lookouts sighted the French fleet, noting that they were flying the colours of the Spanish Navy, a British ally. Littlejohn was not deceived however and when his flag signals went unanswered he turned away in an effort to escape.

The damage to Berwick's rigging was too severe to make any speed, and within four hours the leading French ships were within range. Martin had detached the ships of the line Duquesne and Censeur to give chase, supported by the frigates Alceste and Minerve; the frigate Vestale also joined the chase without orders. This force had rapidly overhauled Berwick, and at 11:00 the lead ship Alceste, under Lieutenant Louis-Jean-Nicolas Lejoille, was the first to open fire from close range as Minerve, Vestale and then the ships of the line all rapidly approached.

For an hour Littlejohn tried to keep ahead of his pursuers in the hope of meeting Hotham sailing westwards from Leghorn, as return fire from Berwick caused significant damage to Alceste; Lejoille was badly wounded in the arm and leg, and Alceste disabled, the foremast brought down by British shot. Just as the frigate started to fall back however a bar shot from Alceste skimmed Berwick's deck and struck Littlejohn in the head, instantly decapitating him. The surviving officers, seeing their captain fall and the rest of the French pursuit squadron closing on their crippled ship, held a brief council where the decision was taken to surrender rather than be destroyed. As Vestale arrive and opened fire, Lieutenant Nesbit Palmer, the senior surviving officer, struck the colours. Shortly thereafter, and unaware of the British surrender, Duquesne pulled alongside and opened fire, although without causing serious damage.

== Aftermath ==
Apart from Littlejohn Berwick had suffered minimal casualties, only four men wounded. This had been attributed to a French desire not to damage the ship too severely and thus only targeting the jury rigging during most of the engagement. In addition to Lejoille, seven were wounded on Alceste and there were no losses on any of the other French ships present. The crew were removed from Berwick and shared amongst the other ships of the pursuit squadron, forbidden to take any baggage with them except the clothes they wore; British historian William James says that they were "shamefully treated". The officers were later exchanged and honourably acquitted at the subsequent court-martial into the loss of the ship. James and later historian William Laird Clowes both blame Hotham for the loss of the ship through his impatience in sailing for Leghorn and abandoning an obviously vulnerable and disabled member of his fleet.

Berwick was taken to Gourjean Bay by Alceste, where the ships refitted in preparation for the journey to Toulon. They were joined on 12 March by the ship of the line Mercure, damaged in a storm, while the rest of Martin's fleet sailed across the Gulf of Genoa. The following day Hotham's fleet discovered the French and gave chase, overhauling the French rearguard in a running battle and capturing ships of the line Ça Ira and Censeur. Hotham declined to press the attack further and Martin retreated to Îles d'Hyères, later joined by Berwick and Mercure. The damaged ships of the fleet, including Berwick and Alceste, were sent to Toulon for repairs, where the ship of the line was commissioned into the French Navy under the same name.

Lejoille was rewarded with command of Berwick, but his wounds were too serious for an immediate return to service and he was initially hospitalised on the flagship Sans-Culottes, and later convalesced in Genoa for eight months, during which time he was promoted to commodore. He went on to fight at the Battle of the Nile in 1798, and subsequently captured HMS Leander at the action of 18 August 1798. Lejoille was killed in action not long after by fire from Neapolitan shore batteries at Brindisi. As a French ship Berwick was later present at the action of 7 October 1795 off Cape St Vincent when Censeur was recaptured by the French, and served for ten years until being recaptured at the Battle of Trafalgar in 1805 and subsequently wrecked on the Spanish coast.

== Bibliography ==
- Adkins, Roy (2004). Trafalgar: The Biography of a Battle. Abacus. ISBN 978-0-349-11632-7.
- Clowes, William Laird (1997) [1900]. The Royal Navy, A History from the Earliest Times to 1900, Volume IV. Chatham Publishing. ISBN 1-86176-013-2.
- Gardiner, Robert, ed. (2001) [1996]. Fleet Battle and Blockade. London: Caxton Editions. ISBN 1-84067-363-X.
- Hennequin, Joseph François Gabriel (1835). Biographie maritime ou notices historiques sur la vie et les campagnes des marins célèbres français et étrangers (in French). Vol. 3. Paris: Regnault éditeur.
- Ireland, Bernard (2005). The Fall of Toulon: The Last Opportunity the Defeat the French Revolution. Cassell. ISBN 0-3043-6726-5.
- James, William (2002) [1827]. The Naval History of Great Britain, Volume 1, 1793–1796. London: Conway Maritime Press. ISBN 0-85177-905-0.
- James, William (2002) [1827]. The Naval History of Great Britain, Volume 2, 1797–1799. London: Conway Maritime Press. ISBN 0-85177-906-9.
- Mostert, Noel (2007). The Line upon a Wind: The Greatest War Fought at Sea Under Sail 1793 – 1815. Vintage Books. ISBN 9-78071-260-9272.
- Thiers, Adolphe (2004) [1840]. Histoire de la Révolution française (in French). Vol. 7. Project Gutenberg.
- Troude, Onésime-Joachim (1867). Batailles navales de la France (in French). Vol. 2. Challamel ainé.
