= Louis-Jean-Nicolas Lejoille =

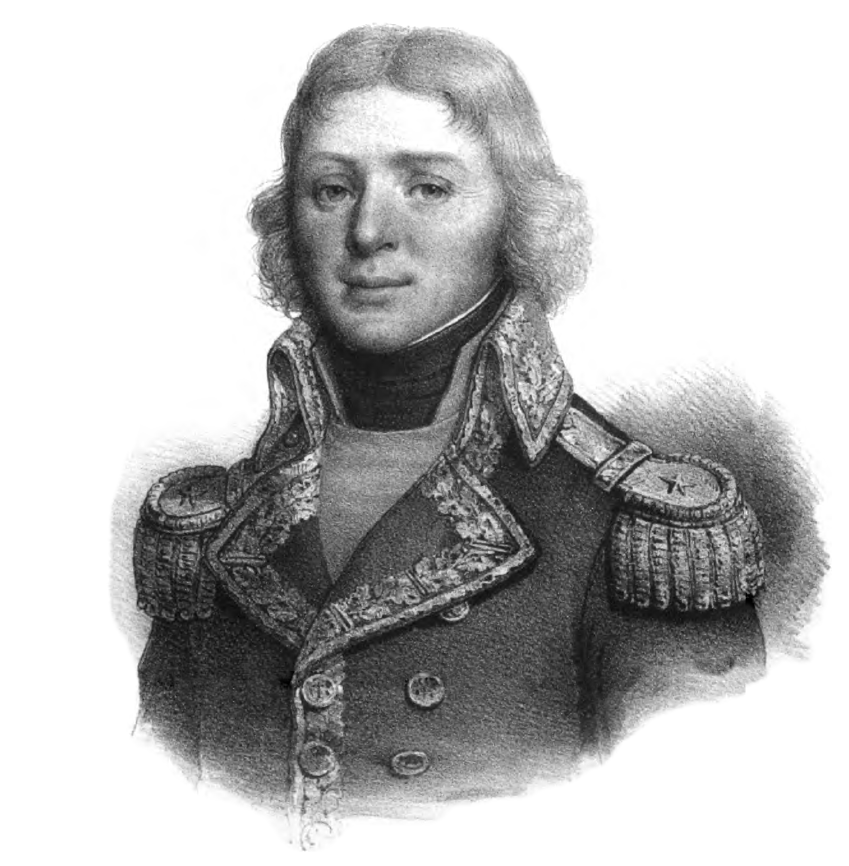
- Portrait by Antoine Maurin, 1838
- Born: 11 November 1759; Saint-Valery-sur-Somme
- Died: 9 April 1799 (aged 39); Brindisi, Italy
- Military career
- Allegiance: French First Republic
- Branch: French Navy
- Service years: 1793–1799
- Rank: Chef de Division
- Commands: Céleste Alceste Généreux
- Conflicts: American Revolutionary War; Battle of Porto Praya; French Revolutionary Wars; Action of 8 June 1794; Action of 8 March 1795 (WIA); Battle of the Nile; Action of 18 August 1798; Siege of Corfu; Brindisi Harbor †

Louis-Jean-Nicolas Lejoille (11 November 1759 – 9 April 1799) was a French Navy officer.

== Career ==
Born to a family of sailors, Lejoille started sailing at seven as a boy on the merchantman commanded by his father. He then studied at Abbeville and Amiens before embarking as a helmsman on the fluyt Tamponne in 1776. In 1780, he joined the crew of the Degranbourg, a merchantman chartered by the Crown in Suffren's fleet, on which he took part in the Battle of Porto Praya. At the arrival at the Cape of Good Hope, Lejoille took command of Degranbourg while his father returned to France.

In 1783, Lejoille returned to the merchant navy. On 6 May 1793, he was appointed Lieutenant and given command of the 14-gun corvette Céleste, which he ferried to Toulon. On 14, an incident occurred between Céleste and the Danish brig Franc-Navire, under Captain Elepsem, that triggered an investigation by the National Convention. Hennequin states that while crossing, Céleste captured the British war-brig Shout, of 18 guns.

Arrived in Toulon, Lejoille was appointed to the Tonnant as first officer. He distinguished himself during the action of 8 June 1794 where the frigate Alceste was captured, and transferred on Alceste as her new captain. In 1795, he took part in the squadron under Admiral Martin, and was the first ship to overhaul and engage the 74-gun HMS Berwick at the action of 8 March 1795 where she was captured. A shot from Alceste having decapitated Berwick 's captain Adam Littlejohn, Lejoille was credited with much of the merit of the capture, and granted command of the prize. However, severely wounded at the right arm and leg, he was transferred to the flagship and convalesced in Genoa for eight months.

Promoted to Chef de Division during his convalescence, Lejoille was first sent to Venice to oversee commissionings of the ships captured in the harbour, and then transferred to Corfu to take command of the 74-gun Généreux, in Brueys' squadron. He took part in the Battle of the Nile at the rear of the French line, duelling with HMS Bellerophon. His men inflicted heavy damage on the Bellerophon, but were damaged themselves in turn and eventually fled from the battlefield.

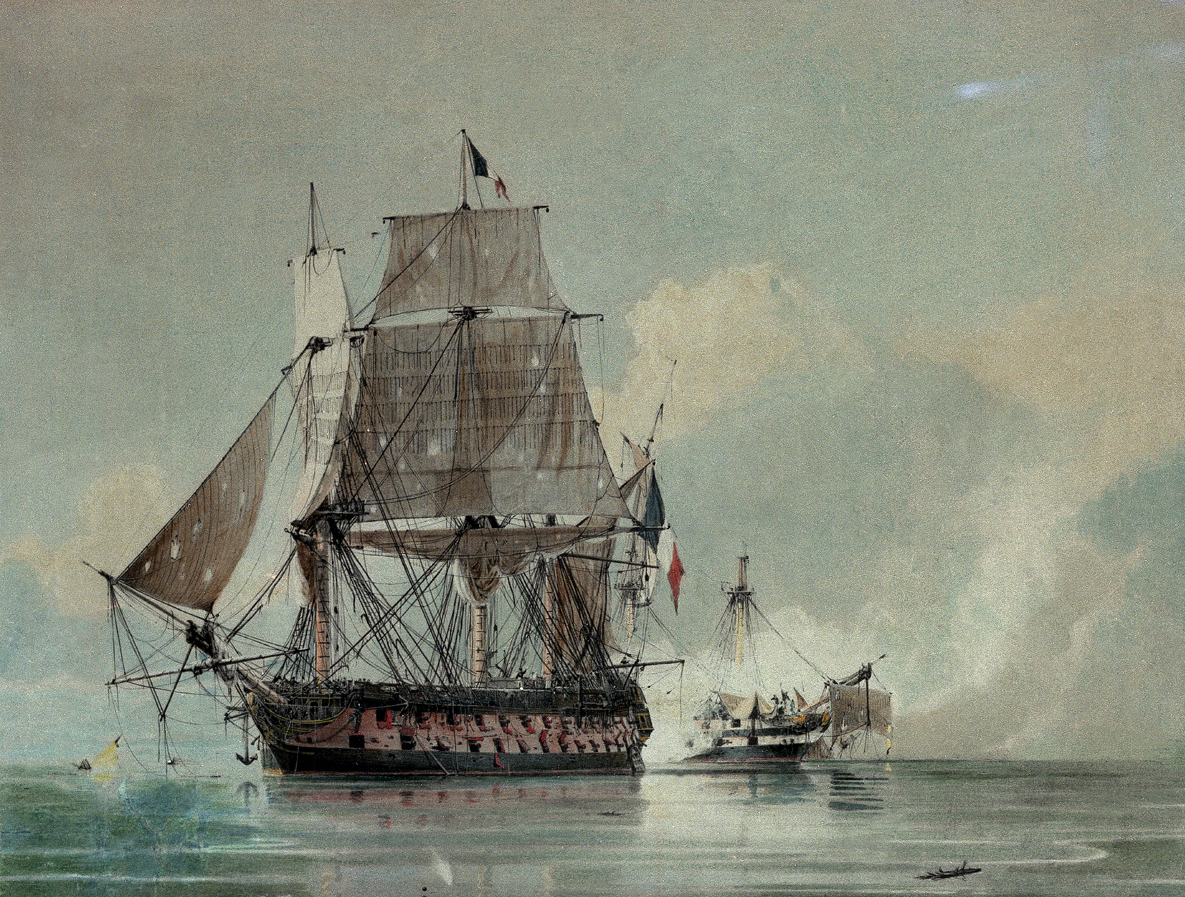
Action between H.M.S. Leander and the French National Ship Le Genereux, August 18th 1798, Chals Henry Seaforth.

After the Battle of the Nile, Généreux sailed to Corfu with Guillaume Tell and the frigate Diane and Justice, which he lost en route. Near Crete, Généreux met with HMS Leander, which she captured in the action of 18 August 1798. The British officers were released on parole.

British sources alleged the crew of Généreux, including Lejoille, engaged in looting after taking possession of Leander. The French captain who ferried the paroled officers of Leander to Trieste attacked the charges, and in his Batailles navales de la France, Onésime-Joachim Troude accused William James of further "augmenting" the accusations, which were originally published in the Gazette de Vienne. Léon Guérin claimed the allegations stemmed entirely from the Life of Nelson and that it furthermore fabricated a report by Lejoille. (Note: Le petit pamphlet anglais in-32, intitulé Life of Nelson, fait pour l'éducation francopophage des équipages britanniques, invente un rapport de Lejoille et dit en outre, contre la vérité, que les deux capitaines et les autres officiers anglais furent indignement traités.)

During the Siege of Corfu, Lejoille led Généreux to assist General Chabot and to harass the Russian blockade. As the situation of Corfu became more critical, Lejoille decided to organise a relief operation: he sailed to Ancona with Généreux and the brig Rivoli, where he loaded a 1000-man force, along with ammunition and food. One month later, he sailed back to Corfu.

Awaiting a reconnaissance of Corfu, Lejoille decided to moor his ships in Brindisi harbour. In order to do so, he intended to sail past the fort defending the entrance channel without firing and attack it from behind. However, a navigation error grounded Généreux under the fort, forcing Lejoille to accept a gunnery duel. Lejoille was killed in the subsequent exchange of fire.

Captain Touffet replaced Lejoille, and the fort and city of Brindisi surrendered after a two-hour battle. Généreux was refloated and awaited news from Corfu, which had in fact fallen on 3 March 1799; when informed, she put to sail and returned to Ancona. A xebec captured near Livorno was named Lejoille in his honour in March 1799.

== Sources and references ==
=== Bibliography ===
- Gardiner, Robert (2001) [1996]. Gardiner, Robert (ed.). Nelson Against Napoleon. Caxton Editions. ISBN 1-86176-026-4.
- Guérin, Léon (1857). Histoire maritime de France (in French). Vol. 6. Dufour et Mulat.
- Hennequin, Joseph François Gabriel (1835). Biographie maritime ou notices historiques sur la vie et les campagnes des marins célèbres français et étrangers (in French). Vol. 3. Paris: Regnault éditeur.
- Lecomte, Jules (1836). Chroniques de la marine française: de 1789 à 1830, d'après les documents officiels (in French). Vol. 1. H. Souverain.
- Levot, Prosper (1866). Les gloires maritimes de la France: notices biographiques sur les plus célèbres marins (in French). Bertrand. p. 300.
- Roche, Jean-Michel (2005). Dictionnaire des bâtiments de la flotte de guerre française de Colbert à nos jours. Vol. 1. Group Retozel-Maury Millau. p. 25. ISBN 978-2-9525917-0-6. OCLC 165892922.
- Troude, Onésime-Joachim (1867). Batailles navales de la France (in French). Vol. 2. Challamel ainé.
- Fonds Marine. Campagnes (opérations; divisions et stations navales; missions diverses). Inventaire de la sous-série Marine BB4. Tome premier : BB4 1 à 482 (1790-1826)
- James, William (2002) [1827]. The Naval History of Great Britain, Volume 2, 1797–1799. Conway Maritime Press. ISBN 0-85177-906-9.
