= French corvette Brune (1781) =

Coquette class corvette

History

France
- Name: Brune
- Namesake: Brune river
- Builder: Le Havre, plans by Jean-Joseph Ginoux
- Laid down: August 1754
- Launched: 20 January 1781
- In service: March 1781
- Captured: by Russia, 3 March 1799

Ottoman Empire
- Name: ?

General characteristics
- Class & type: Coquette-class corvette
- Displacement: 400 tonnes
- Length: 38.7 m (127 ft 0 in)
- Beam: 9.9 m (32 ft 6 in)
- Draught: 4.9 m (16 ft 1 in)
- Armament: 18 × 8-pounder long guns + 8 × 4-pounder long guns

Brune was a Coquette-class 20-gun corvette of the French Navy, launched in 1781 and captured in 1799 at the siege of Corfu, which saw a joint Russian and Turkish fleet capture Corfu from an occupying French force.

== Career ==
On 15 November 1794, Minerve, in company with Alceste and Brune, under Ensign Deniéport sailed for a diplomatic mission to Tunis before returning to Toulon on 29 December. Brune was present at the action of 8 March 1795, and near the subsequent battle of Hyères Islands: in mid-July, Brune and the frigate Vestale, under Commander Delorme, escorted a 25-ship wheat convoy from Genoa to France, when three enemy frigates gave chase; Brune, which was a very bad sailor, had to take refugee at La Spezia, while Vestale managed to keep the frigates at bay and defend the convoy. After Deniéport was promoted to lieutenant and commander, she continued to escort convoys in the Adriatic Sea.

On 26 March 1797, Brune departed Ancona in a division led by Commander Sibille, of the eight-gun Bonaparte. The other vessels were the lugger Libérateur d'Italie (under Laugier), the xebec Corse (under Muron), and two transports loaded with ammunition.

By 1798, Brune was at Corfu, when the city came under siege by a Russo-Ottoman fleet. During the siege she slipped by the Russian ships and into Corfu to inform General Chabot that reinforcements were coming from Ancona. The reinforcements did leave on 8 December, but only reached Corfu's north coast in early January. They then left when they were unable to establish contact with Chabot.

On 28 February 1799, the Russians and Ottomans attacked Vido, which is a small island (less than kilometer in diameter) at the mouth of the port of Corfu. After a four-hour bombardment by several ships, the attackers had succeeded in suppressing all five shore batteries on the island. Leander and Brune tried to intervene but were damaged and forced to retreat to the protection of the batteries of Corfu.

On 3 March 1799, the Russians captured Brune. At the end of the siege the victors divided up the spoils, and the Russians gave her to the Ottomans.
