= Louis Gabriel Deniéport =

Louis Gabriel Deniéport (French pronunciation: [lwi ɡabʁijɛl dənjepɔʁ]; 14 April 1765, Dieppe – 20 October 1805) was a French naval captain who fought in several battles, most notably Trafalgar, at which he was killed commanding the Achille.

== Life ==
Born to hotelier parents on rue de l'oranger in Dieppe, his godfather was Nicolas Boiloy, a businessman in the Saint-Remy parish, and his godmother was the widow Michel Martel, a businesswoman in the parish of Saint-Jacques. Like his brother Jean-Vincent Deniéport, Louis was a brilliant student at the Oratorian school and won the general prize in 1785, though he had to enter the Oratorian house very young. His passion for the sea and probable aptitude for action rather than philosophical meditation interrupted his studies aged 14 when he began serving on the privateers that were common in the port of Dieppe. On these he gained seagoing skills in the subaltern posts of novice, matelot and aide-pilote.

Better educated than his fellow seamen and also daring and able, he came to public attention just as the mainly-noble officer corps of the navy was weeded out on the French Revolution. On 9 messidor year II (9 June 1794), he was made an enseigne "entretenu", by decree of Salicetti, representative of the people. A note from Toulon on his bearing stated "his manners are pure, exact in the service, inclined neither to wine nor gaming, good in political conduct, educated, with robust health, loved by his crew".

He took command of the corvette Brune on 5 frimaire year II (15 November 1794) and went to Toulon under the command of general Martin. He fought in the action in which the British captured the Censeur and Ça Ira. In the course of this action Le Timoléon was dismasted and sinking, under fire from three British ships surrounding it. The Brune managed to draw off the British ships' fire, for which action general Martin promoted Deniéport to lieutenant de vaisseau on 21 germinal year IV (10 April 1796). Deniéport then took part in a long campaign in the Levant and, when he came under suspicion from agents of the French Directory, the city of Sète attested to his loyalty. He thus rose up the career ladder to capitaine de frégate on 14 floréal year V (3 May 1797).

On 2 brumaire year VII (23 October 1798) he received a provisional commission as a brevet capitaine de vaisseau commanding the Leander, putting him under the command of chef de division Lejoille. He was sent to Corfu, which Russia and the Ottoman Empire were hoping to annex, doing his best with a lean Greek and Venetian crew. However, his ship was surrounded by an enemy fleet and captured, though he was soon the subject of a prisoner exchange and showered with recommendations and flattering references. Commissioner general Dubois certified that "Commander Deniéport fulfilled all the dutier of a good officer and a brave republican" and the whole garrison of Corfu also witnessed to his good behaviour. Contre-amiral Perré wrote that Deniéport showed "conduct worthy of praise, a good officer, a true seaman, zealous, active, who very well fulfilled the several particular and very delicate tasks he was entrusted with". Général de division Chabot also wrote "This captain, with his vessel devoid of people, resisted beyond all praise" and vice admiral Thévenard praised "his zeal and his talent". Ill and tired out from his hard voyages, Deniéport asked for leave to spend time in Dieppe, which he had not visited for seven years.

== Sources ==
- Bulletin trimestriel les amis du vieux Dieppe, année 1930, fascicule n° 30.
