= Russo-Ottoman alliance =

Defensive alliance during the Napoleonic era

The Russo-Ottoman alliance was a defensive alliance between the Russian Empire and the Ottoman Empire directed against France between 1799 and 1806, during the French Revolutionary and Napoleonic Wars.

The first treaty of defensive alliance, including secret clauses, was signed on 3 January 1799 [O.S. 23 December 1798]. That was complemented by the Anglo-Ottoman alliance, formed later that month. The alliance was renewed on 23 September [O.S. 11 September] 1805.

The falling of Corfu in March 1799, military expedition ended the two-year French occupation and secured the strategic islands from Napoleonic influence. The alliance oversee Septinsular Republic, also known as the Republic of the Seven United Islands, was the nominal protectorate established in 1800. It was the first time that Greeks had been granted self-government since fall of the Byzantine Empire. The Republic was granted autonomy status but remained under joint Tsarist-Ottoman control.

French victory over Russia in the War of the Third Coalition caused a shift in Ottoman policy away from Russia and towards France. Selim III refused to ratify the treaty signed in September 1805. By February 1806, Russian warships were being blocked from the Turkish Straits. In October, Russia invaded the Ottoman Empire and in December the Ottomans formally declared war. The Russo-Ottoman War lasted until 1812. In March 1812, Russia demanded an alliance as part of the treaty to end the war, which was rejected by the Ottomans, who preferred neutrality. It did not find its way into the Treaty of Bucharest, which formally ended the Russo-Ottoman War in May.

== See also ==
- Siege of Corfu (1798–1799)
- French campaign in Egypt and Syria
- Mediterranean campaign of 1798
- War of the Second Coalition

== Bibliography ==
- Aksan, Virginia H. (2007). Ottoman Wars, 1700–1870: An Empire Besieged. Routledge.
- Hurewitz, J.C. (July 1962). "Russia and the Turkish Straits: A Revaluation of the Origins of the Problem". World Politics. 14 (4): 605–632. doi:10.2307/2009311. JSTOR 2009311. S2CID 154130755.
- Lewis, Bernard (1955). "Review of Mouravieff 1954". The Slavonic and East European Review. 34 (82): 232–235. JSTOR 4204721.
- Mikaberidze, Alexander (2020). The Napoleonic Wars: A Global History. Oxford University Press.
- Morkva, Valeriy (September 2010). Russia's Policy of Rapprochement with the Ottoman Empire in the Era of the French Revolutionary and Napoleonic Wars, 1792–1806 (PDF) (Ph.D.). Bilkent University Ankara.
- Mouravieff, Boris (1954). L'Alliance russo-turque au milieu des guerres napoléoniennes. Éditions de la Baconnière.
