= HMS Berwick (1775) =

Elizabeth-class ship of the line

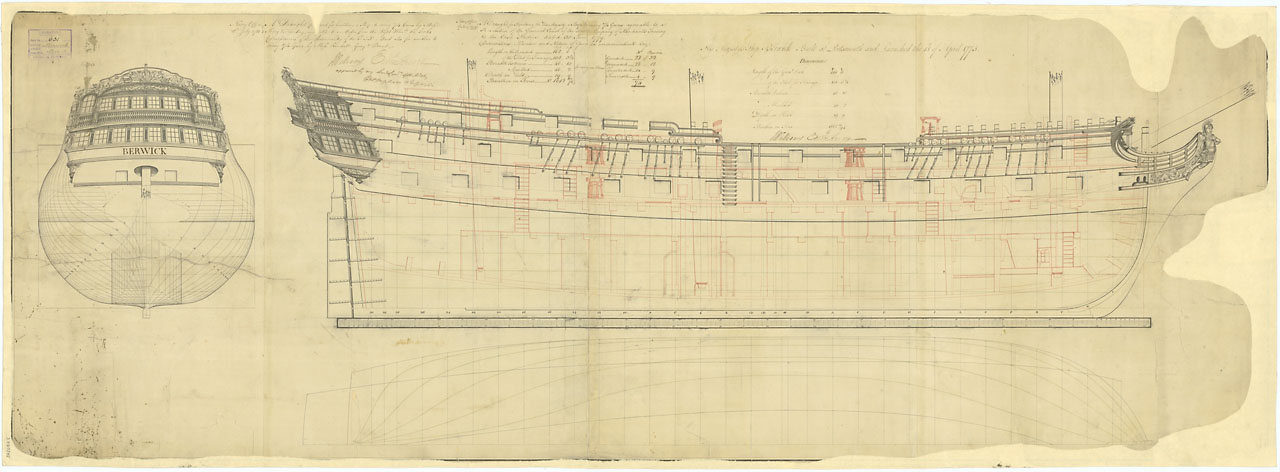
- Berwick

History

Great Britain
- Name: HMS Berwick
- Ordered: 12 December 1768
- Builder: Portsmouth Dockyard
- Laid down: May 1769
- Launched: 18 April 1775
- Captured: 8 March 1795, by the French
- Notes: Participated in: First Battle of Ushant; Battle of Dogger Bank; Action of 8 March 1795

France
- Name: Berwick
- Acquired: 8 March 1795
- Honours and awards: Battle of Trafalgar
- Captured: 21 October 1805, by Royal Navy
- Fate: Wrecked, 22 October 1805, in the storm following the Battle of Trafalgar

General characteristics
- Class & type: Elizabeth-class ship of the line
- Tons burthen: 162256/94 (bm)
- Length: 168 ft 6 in (51.4 m) (gundeck)
- Beam: 47 ft (14.3 m)
- Draught: Unladen:18 ft (5.5 m); Laden:47 ft (14.3 m)
- Depth of hold: 12 ft 10 in (3.9 m)
- Propulsion: Sails
- Sail plan: Full-rigged ship
- Armament: Lower deck: 28 × 32-pounder guns; Upper deck: 28 × 18-pounder guns; QD: 14 × 9-pounder guns; Fc: 4 × 9-pounder guns

HMS Berwick was a 74-gun Elizabeth-class third rate of the Royal Navy, launched at Portsmouth Dockyard on 18 April 1775, to a design by Sir Thomas Slade. She fought the French at the Battle of Ushant (1778) and the Dutch at the Battle of Dogger Bank (1781). The French captured her in the action of 8 March 1795 during the French Revolutionary Wars and she served with them with some success then and at the start of the Napoleonic Wars until the British recaptured her at the Battle of Trafalgar. Berwick sank shortly thereafter in a storm.

== Royal Navy service ==
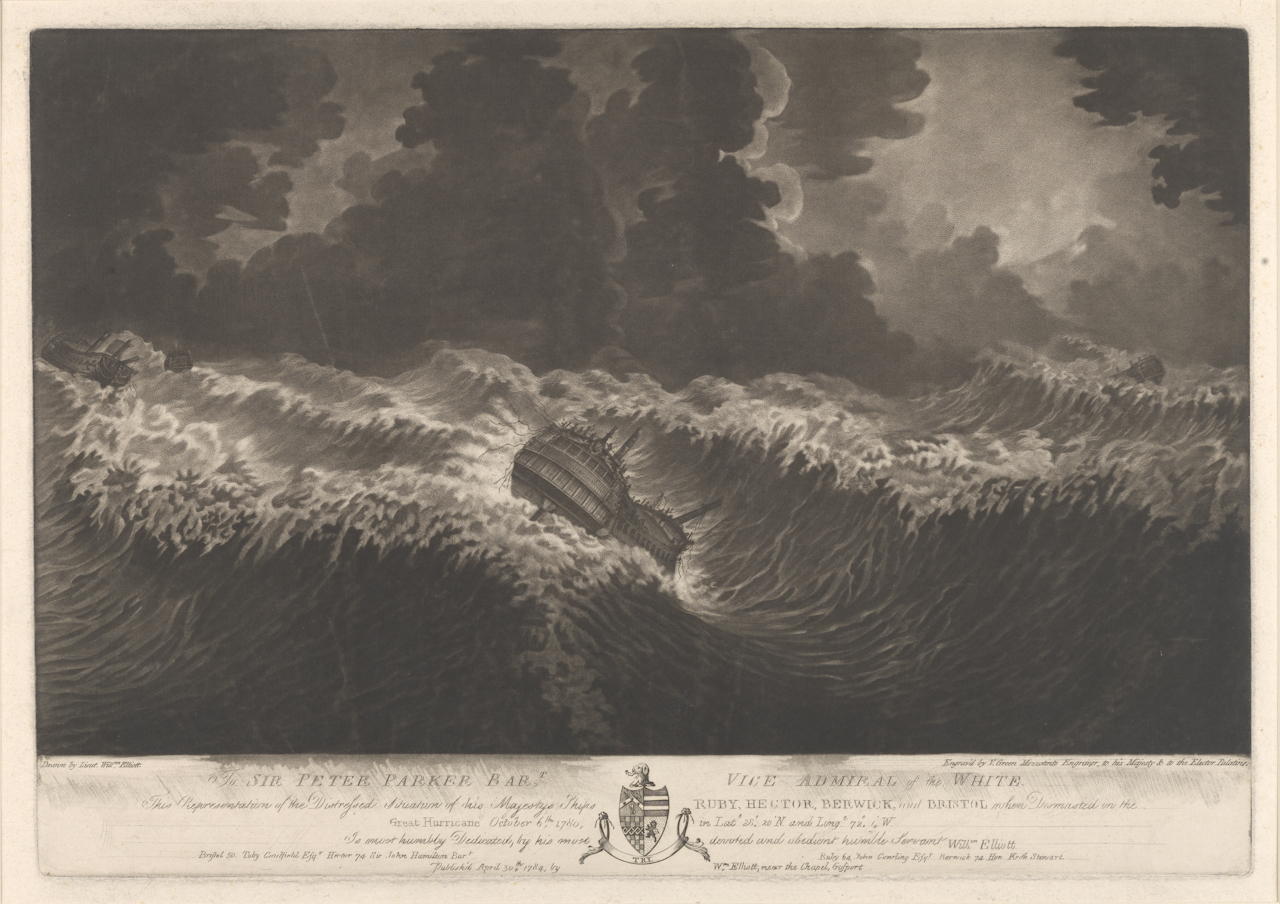
Representation of the Distressed Situation of His Majesty's Ships Ruby, Hector, Berwick and Bristol when Dismasted in the Great Hurricane, 6 October 1780

As one of the newest ships of the line, she was commissioned in December 1777. On the entry of France into the American War of Independence in 1778 Berwick joined the Channel Fleet. In July, she took part in the Battle of Ushant under the command of Captain the Hon. Keith Stewart. She served with the Channel Fleet throughout 1779.

In 1780 she was sent out to the West Indies as part of a squadron under Commodore Walshingham that was sent out to reinforce the fleet under Sir George Rodney. But Walshingham's ships arrived too late for the battles of that year and she was then sent to Jamaica. The lieutenant on this trip was John Hunter, who later became an admiral and the second Governor of New South Wales.

While Berwick was on the Jamaica station, she received serious damage from the October 1780 West Indies hurricane, which completely dismasted her and drove her out to sea. The damage forced her to return across the Atlantic to England for repairs.

After repairs, Berwick sailed to the North Sea where Captain Stewart became commander in chief of the station. The North Sea was becoming an increasingly important convoy route because French and Spanish squadrons cruising in the Western Approaches to the Channel had made that route unsafe for British convoys.

In 1781 Berwick was under the command of Captain John Ferguson. On 17 April she, with Belle Poule, captured the privateer Callonne, under the command of Luke Ryan. Calonne was only two years old, a fast sailer, and well equipped for a voyage of three months. She had a crew of 200 men and was armed with twenty-two 9-pounder guns, six 4-pounder guns, and six 12-pounder carronades.

When the British Admiralty received news that the Dutch, who had joined the war at the beginning of 1781, were fitting out a squadron for service in the North Sea, it reinforced Berwick with a squadron under Vice-Admiral Sir Hyde Parker, who had hoisted his flag in Fortitude. Berwick also received two 68-pounder carronades for her poop deck.

On 15 August, while escorting a convoy of 700 merchantmen from Leith to the Baltic, Parker's squadron of seven ships of the line met a Dutch squadron under Rear-Admiral Johan Zoutman, also consisting of seven ships of the line, but also encumbered with a convoy. In the ensuing Battle of Dogger Bank, Berwick suffered a total of 16 killed and 58 wounded.

After the war, Berwick was paid off in 1783 and laid up in ordinary.

She was commissioned again on 1 January 1793 under Captain Sir John Collins. At the outbreak of the French Revolutionary Wars he sailed her out for the Mediterranean on 22 May to join the fleet under Admiral Lord Hood. Under Hood, Berwick participated in Toulon operations late in the year.

Collins died in March 1794. His successors were, in short order, Captains William Shield, George Campbell, George Henry Towry, and lastly, William Smith.

=== Capture ===
In early 1795 Berwick had been refitting in San Fiorenzo Bay, Corsica, when her lower masts, stripped of rigging, rolled over the side and were lost. A hasty court martial dismissed Smith, the First Lieutenant, and the Master from the ship. After fitting a jury rig, Berwick, under Captain Adam Littlejohn, sailed to join the British fleet at Leghorn, but ran into the French fleet. In the ensuing action the French captured Berwick.

At 11 am, close off Cap Corse, the French frigate Alceste passed to leeward and opened fire within musket-shot on Berwick's lee bow. Minerve and Vestale soon took their stations on Berwick's quarter. By noon, her rigging was cut to pieces and every sail was in ribbons. During the battle four sailors were wounded and a bar-shot decapitated Littlejohn; he was the only man killed. Command then devolved upon Lieutenant Nesbit Palmer, who consulted with the other officers. Palmer decided that Berwick was unable to escape in her disabled state and that all further resistance was useless; he then ordered that Berwick strike her colours.

The French towed her back to Toulon and subsequently commissioned her into the French Navy as Berwick, under Louis-Jean-Nicolas Lejoille.

== French Navy service ==
In September 1795, she sailed from Toulon for Newfoundland as part of a squadron of six ships of the line under Rear-Admiral de Richery. In October, Richery's squadron fell in with the British Smyrna convoy, taking 30 out of 31 ships, and retaking the 74-gun Censeur. The squadron then put into Cádiz, where it remained refitting for the remainder of the year.

On 4 August 1796, Richery finally set sail from Cádiz for North America with his seven ships of the line. His squadron was escorted out into the Atlantic by the Spanish Admiral Don Juan de Lángara, with 20 ships of the line. In September, Richery destroyed the British Newfoundland fishing fleet.

In November, Berwick returned to Rochefort with four of the other ships from Richery's squadron, before sailing on to Brest.

By 1803, Berwick was back in the Mediterranean at Toulon.

== Napoleonic Wars ==
In March 1805, Berwick sailed for the West Indies as part of a fleet of 11 French ships of the line under Vice-Admiral Villeneuve. Off Cádiz, the fleet was joined by the 74-gun ship Aigle, and six Spanish ships of the line under Vice-Admiral Gravina. When the fleet reached the West Indies, Villeneuve sent Commodore Cosmao-Kerjulien with the Pluton and the Berwick to attack the British position on Diamond Rock, which surrendered on 2 June.

When Villeneuve heard that Nelson had followed him to the West Indies, he sailed for Europe. Sir Robert Calder, with 15 ships of the line, intercepted the French off Cape Finisterre. After a violent artillery exchange, the fleets separated in the fog. Exhausted after six months at sea, the French anchored in Ferrol before sailing to Cádiz to rest and refit. With his command under question and wanting to meet the British fleet to gain a decisive victory, Villeneuve left Cádiz to meet the British fleet near Cape Trafalgar.

== Fate ==
On 21 October 1805, Berwick fought at the Battle of Trafalgar, where Achille re-captured her. Berwick sank near Sanlúcar in the tempest the following day after her French prisoners cut her cables. Although Donegal was nearby and quickly sent boats, many of the c.200 persons aboard Berwick lost their lives.
