= French ship Généreux (1785) =

Ship of the line of the French Navy

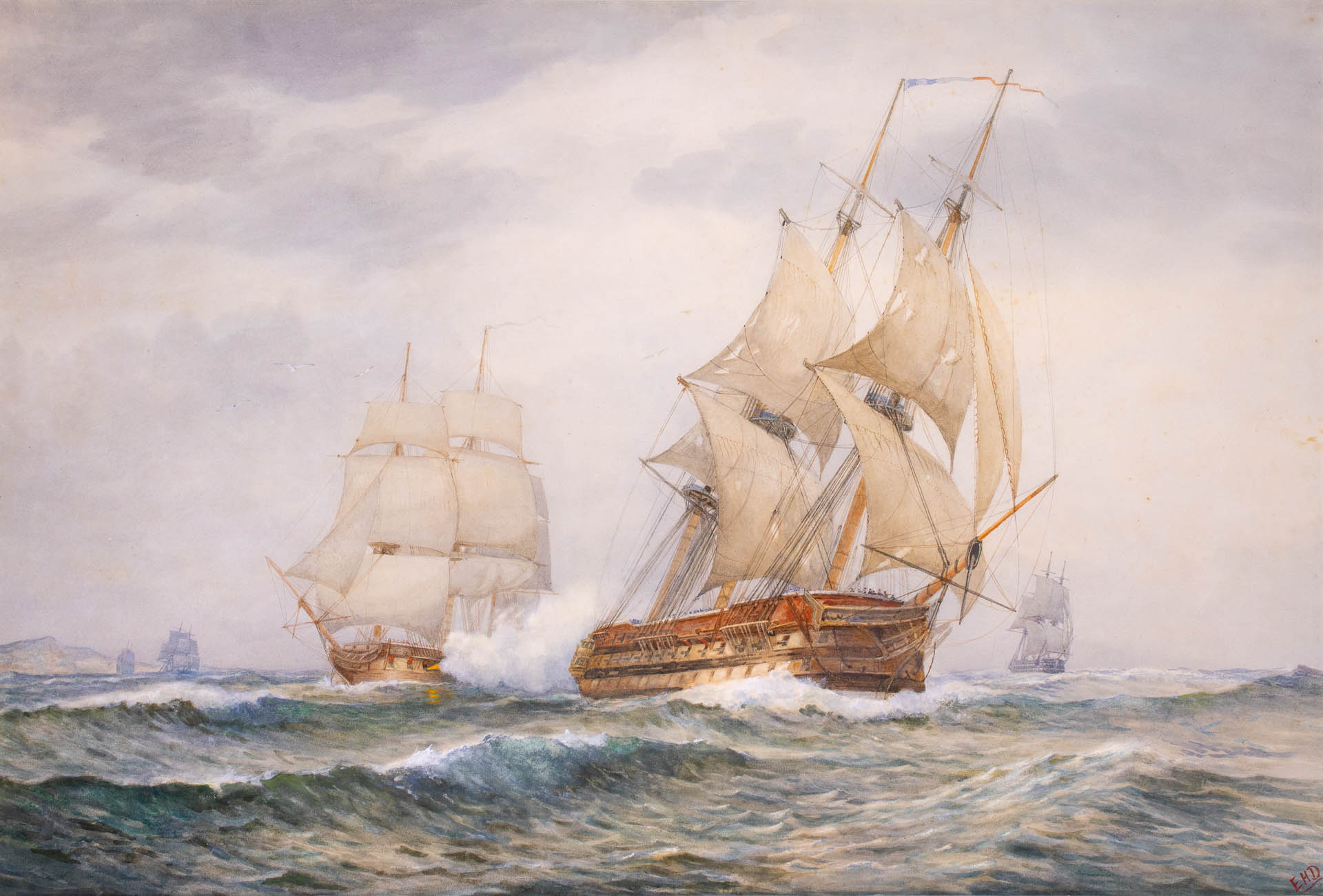
- Généreux (second from right) at the Battle of the Malta Convoy

History

France
- Name: Généreux
- Namesake: Generosity
- Builder: Rochefort shipyard
- Launched: 12 June (or July) 1785
- Captured: by Britain, 1800

Great Britain
- Name: Généreux
- Acquired: 1800
- Nickname(s): Jenny Rooks
- Fate: Broken up in 1816

General characteristics
- Class & type: Téméraire-class ship of the line
- Displacement: 3,069 tonneaux
- Tons burthen: 1,537 port tonneaux
- Length: 55.87 metres (183.3 ft) (172 pied)
- Beam: 14.90 metres (48 ft 11 in)
- Draught: 7.26 metres (23.8 ft) (22 pied)
- Propulsion: Up to 2,485 m^{2} (26,750 sq ft) of sails
- Armament: 74 guns: Lower gundeck: 28 × 36-pounder long guns; Upper gundeck: 30 × 18-pounder long guns; Forecastle and Quarter deck: 16 × 8-pounder long guns; 4 × 36-pounder carronades

Généreux was a 74-gun Téméraire-class ship of the line built for the French Navy during the 1780s. After capture she completed her career as part of the Royal Navy as HMS Généreux.

== History ==
She was launched in 1785 at Rochefort. Under Louis-Jean-Nicolas Lejoille, she was one of only two ships to escape the British attack at the Battle of the Nile in August 1798, along with Guillaume Tell. Shortly after the battle of the Nile, on 18 August 1798, she fell in with a smaller British ship of the line, HMS Leander of 50 guns. After a long battle, the Généreux captured the Leander, with the Leander suffering 35 killed and 57 wounded and the Généreux suffered around 100 killed and 180 wounded.

In March 1799, Généreux escorted a convoy to Corfu, which was being besieged by a joint Russo-Ottoman fleet. En route, her captain, Lejoille, decided to bombard Brindisi. He was killed in the ensuing exchange of fire, and lieutenant Claude Touffet took over. The city fell on 3 March after a two-hour battle.On 6 February 1800, Généreux, under Captain Cyprien Renaudin, departed from Toulon leading a squadron comprising the frigate Badine, the corvettes Sans Pareille and Fauvette, and the fluyt Ville de Marseille, under Counter-admiral Jean-Baptiste Perrée.

On the morning of 18 February, a British fleet under Horatio Nelson starting chasing the French squadron off Lampedusa. In the ensuing Battle of the Malta Convoy, Perrée was killed, and Généreux covered the squadron, allowing Badine, Sans Pareille and Fauvette to escape, before striking her colours. Her battle ensign, a 16 m by 8.3 m tricolour, was given to the city of Norwich by Nelson and Edward Berry, and was displayed in St Andrew's Hall until 1897, and then at a 1905 exhibition at Norwich Castle. The flag has been preserved; its size and completeness marking it as a special artefact of the period.

She became HMS Généreux and she was in Minorca in 1801 when she press-ganged a crew from the Walmesley. She engaged Spanish ships and she was intended to go to Egypt. Storm damage prevented this so she patrolled off what is now Libya. After taking part in an unsuccessful attack on the French island of Elba, she set sail from Minorca for Spithead after peace was declared. She arrived at Spithead on 27 July 1802. She was finally broken up in 1816.

== See also ==
- List of ships of the line of France
