= Siege of Corfu (1798–1799) =

Russian and Ottoman military offensive during the War of the Second Coalition

- Part of the War of the Second Coalition
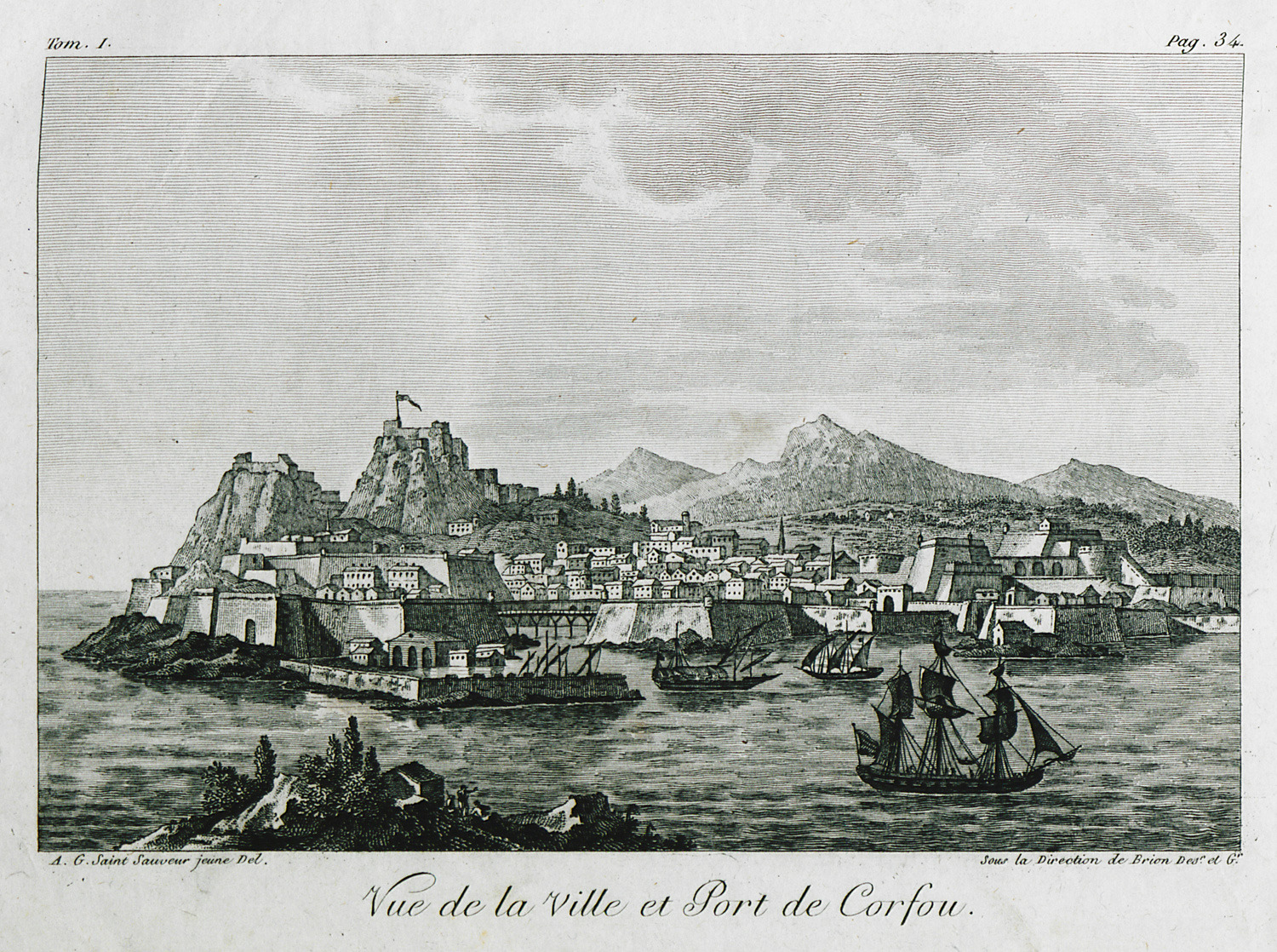
- Corfu city and its fortifications in 1800, engraving by André Grasset de Saint-Sauveur
Date	4 November 1798 – 3 March 1799 (Note: O.S.: 24 Oct. – 20 Feb.)
Location	Corfu, Corcyre, Ionian Islands 39°37′26″N 19°55′17″E
Result	Russo-Ottoman victory

Belligerents
Russian Empire; Ottoman Empire; Pashalik of Yanina	France

Commanders and leaders
(Russian Empire) Fyodor Ushakov (Russian Empire) Ivan Selivachev (Ottoman Empire) Kadir Bey; Ali Pasha of Ioannina	Louis Chabot (surrendered)

Units involved
Russo-Ottoman Naval Squadron	Division du Levant, French Naval Division

Strength
6,200 to 8,000; ~1,700 Russians and Ottomans; ~4,500 Albanians; 12 ships of the line 11 frigates Several smaller vessels	3,700 to 4,000; 150 coastal guns (only battleworthy); 2 ships of the line 1 frigate 1 bomb vessel 1 brig and 4 small vessels

Casualties and losses
300 to 400 killed and wounded ~131 (Russians) ~169 (Ottomans, Albanians)	700 to 1,000 (Note: There were about 3,000 men left in the garrison at the time of capitulation. In accordance with Gaston Bodart, 500 killed and wounded and 500 captured. As per modern Russian outgiving, the French were supposed to lose 700 men out of the 3,700 available.); 2,931 capitulated 1 ship of the line, 1 frigate, 1 aviso, 1 bomb ketch, 2 brigantines, 6 galleys, 1 canonnière, and 3 merchant ships captured 636 guns and mortars captured

The Siege of Corfu (November 1798 – March 1799) was a military operation by a joint Russian and Turkish fleet against French troops occupying the fortified island of Corfu; ended in Coalition victory. Corfu fortifications had a strong reputation, but by the siege time they were in a parlous state.

== Background ==
By the Treaty of Campo Formio (November 1797) and the dissolution of the Republic of Venice, the Ionian Islands were ceded to the French Republic, which occupied Corfu as the département Corcyre.

In 1798, Admiral Fyodor Ushakov was sent to the Mediterranean in command of a joint Russian-Turkish squadron to support General Alexander Suvorov's upcoming Italian and Swiss expedition (1799–1800). One of Ushakov's main tasks was to take the strategically important Ionian Islands from the French. In October 1798 the French garrisons were driven from Cythera, Zakynthos, Cephalonia, and Lefkada. It remained to take the largest and best-fortified island of the archipelago, Corfu.

== French preparations ==
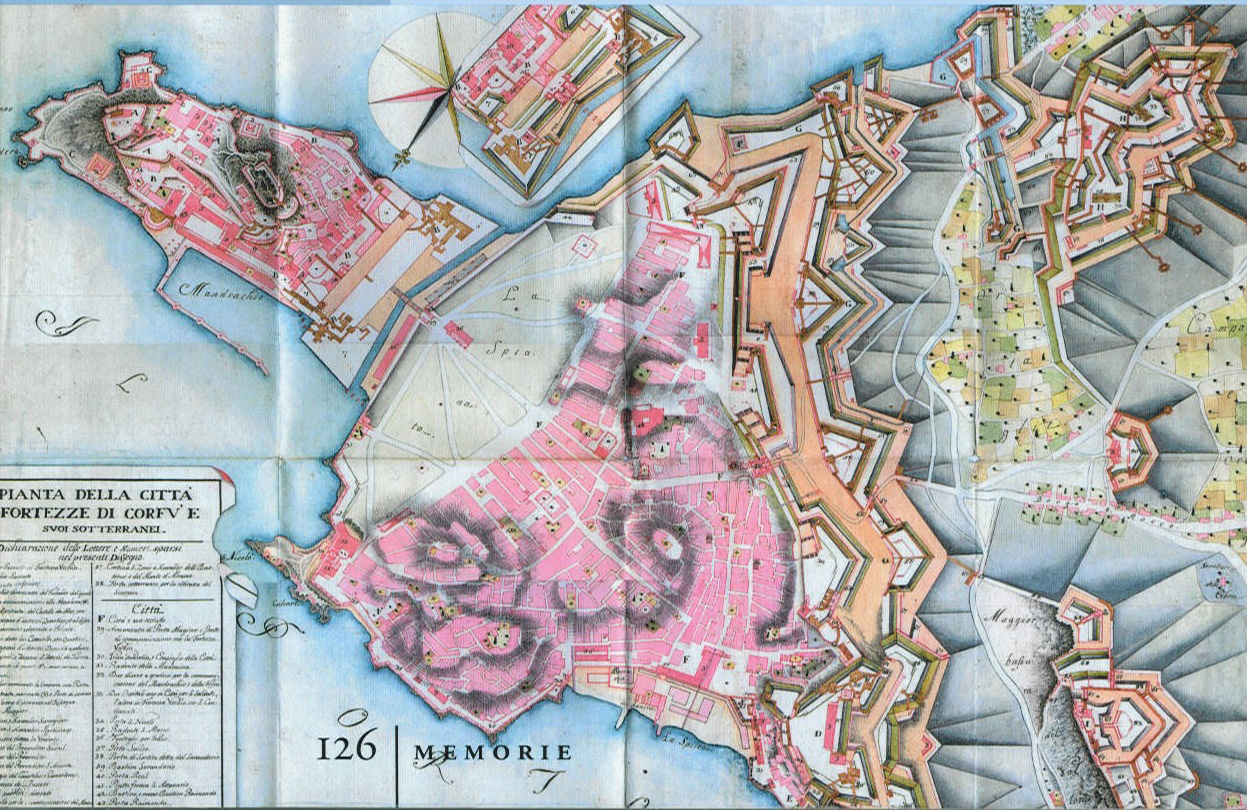
Layout of the fortifications of Corfu city, c. 1780

The city of Corfu is located on the east coast in the central part of the island between two forts:

- The medieval Old Fortress, on the eastern tip of the city, cut off from the city by an artificial moat;
- The more modern New Fortress, a huge fortification complex, dominates the city's northeastern part.

A high wall ran along the shore from the new to the old fort. The town was also covered by bastions on two mountains, Abraham and Salvatore, and the intermediate fort of San Rocco. From the sea, the city was protected by the well-fortified island of Vido, and the smaller island of Lazaretto, two miles up the coast, was also strengthened by the French.

The Venetians did not maintain the fortresses well, which was in a parlous state. Of the c. 500 artillery pieces in the fortifications, only about 150 were capable of being used. The French also lacked provisions, which had to be hurriedly requisitioned from the local population. In addition, the French troops of the Division du Levant, commanded by General Louis Chabot, had been dispersed as garrisons among the islands and the mainland exclaves, leaving only about 1,500 men for the defence of Corfu. These were a motley force from the 6th and 79th demi-brigades (regiments), sappers, sailors and artillerymen, as well as a few local volunteers and gendarmes. Urgent messages were sent to Italy, asking for reinforcements of 3,000 men, supplies, and ammunition. The local government was placed in the hands of a French commission, and on 22 October, the population, whose loyalties were doubtful, was disarmed.

In the harbour was a French division of two ships of the line, the 74-gun Généreux and 54-gun Leander, the 20-gun corvette Brune (as per another claim, the frigate La Brune), the bomb-vessel La Frimer, a brig, and four auxiliary vessels.

== The siege of Corfu ==
On 4 November 1798, Ushakov's Russo-Turkish detachment under Captain 1st rank Ivan Selivachev, consisting of three ships of the line, three frigates, and several small ships, began the siege of Corfu. Ushakov arrived by November 19, by which time their forces consisted of 8 line ships and 7 frigates and small vessels. They were joined shortly afterwards by a Turkish detachment and another Russian detachment of 1 line ship and 1 frigate under the command of Captain Dmitry Senyavin. Given the strong fortifications of the island and the lack of strength for a landing, it was initially decided to wait for Turkish reinforcements for a landing force and siege artillery. However, on the first day, the French abandoned their fortifications on Lazaretto island, which the Russians immediately occupied.

On 13 November, a small force of Russians landed without opposition and took the small Gouvia port, about five miles along the coast. From then on, the Russians began building artillery batteries and shelling the French-held forts. In December, another Russian detachment, this one under Captain 2nd rank Alexander Sorokin, augmented the besieging forces by 2 frigates. Then the detachment of Rear-Admiral Pavel Pustoshkin arrived with 2 line ships. By 12 January 1799 the combined fleet thus consisted of 12 ships of the line, 11 frigates, and many smaller vessels. But Ushakov still had to wait for land forces, the lack of which made decisive actions against the fortress itself difficult.

On the night of 26 January, the Généreux, with her sails painted black, and the brig escaped from the harbour and sailed to Ancona.

In February, about 4,000 Ottoman troops from Albania arrived. These troops were poorly disciplined, had neither food nor combat supplies, and were more of a burden than a help to Ushakov's allied force. The admiral's position became difficult: the squadron began to feel a shortage of supplies and spread of diseases; but Ushakov did not lose heart. The siege works, at one time stopped due to the conditions of winter blockade, were resumed: on 31 January 1799, under the cover of the xebec Macarius, construction of a battery on the Hill of St. Pantaleon was started; the battery was armed with 16 large naval guns, 14 mortars and field guns; the battery was built in 10 days, it was commanded by Captain 1st rank Yukharin. Soon another battery with 7 mortars was built. Fire from these batteries caused great damage; repelled all sorties; in one of these sorties, the French lost up to 50 killed and a number of wounded.

It was decided to land on the island of Vido—the key to the defense of Corfu—using naval artillery against its shore batteries.

=== Capture of Vido ===
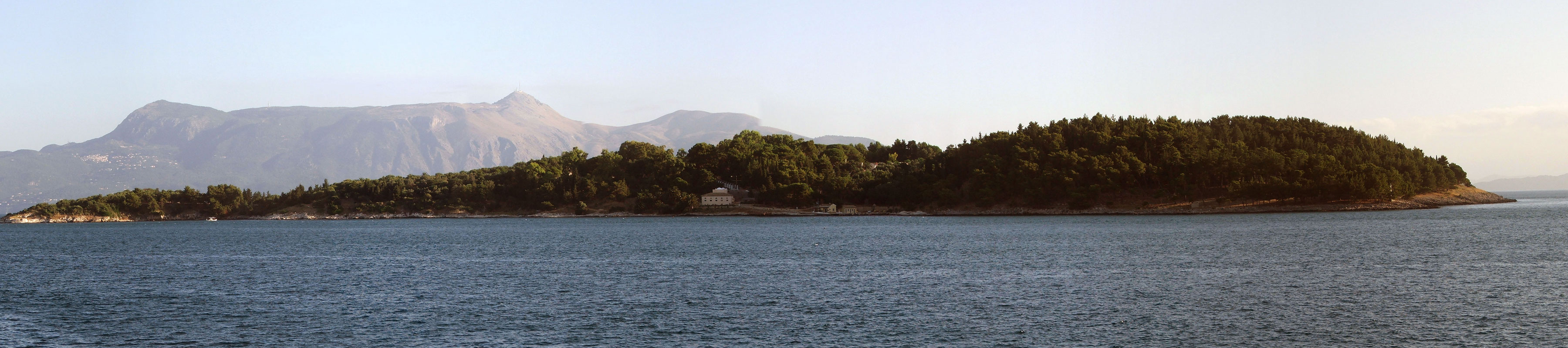
Vido island

The plan of attack was discussed in detail by Ushakov in the general council of admirals and commanders of ships, all possible contingencies were carefully foreseen and worked out. The assault on Vido began early in the morning of 28 February 1799. After a four-hour bombardment by several ships, all five shore batteries on the island had been suppressed. The Leander and Brune tried to intervene but were damaged and forced to retreat to the protection of Corfu. The allied fleet landed over 2,000 men including approx. 1,250 Russians and 750 Turks on Vido, and the island was taken after a two-hour battle. Of the 800 men defending the island, 200 were killed, and 400 were taken prisoner, including the commandant of the island, Brigadier-General Pivron. About 150 men managed to swim to Corfu. Russian losses were 31 killed and 100 wounded. The Ottomans lost 180 killed and wounded.

=== Capture of Corfu city ===
After the fall of Vido, Ushakov held the key to Corfu. On 1 March, the captured batteries on the island opened fire on the city's forts, supported by the Russian shore batteries and some of the Russian and Turkish warships. The allied forces (consisting of Russian soldiers and seamen, Albanians, Turks, and Corfiotes) stormed and captured the outlying forts of San Rocco, San Salvatore, and San Abraham.

On 2 March, Ushakov planned to assault the principal forts, but in the morning, the French sent envoys to request a forty-eight-hour armistice, and on 3 March, they surrendered.

== Aftermath ==
The capitulation agreed upon between the French and Russians was honourable, including a provision for the French troops to be conveyed to Toulon. The allies took the remaining French ships in the harbour, including the Leander captured from the Royal Navy on 18 August 1798; the Russians returned her to the British.

Admiral Ushakov was honoured by the Emperor of Russia with the star of the Order of St Alexander Nevsky and by the Ottoman Sultan with a chelengk, rarely awarded to non-Muslims.

The capture of Corfu completed the Russo-Turkish takeover of the Ionian Islands, which was of great military and political importance. The islands became the Seven Islands Republic, a temporary protectorate of Russia and Turkey. For several years, Corfu served as a base for the Russian Mediterranean fleet. Ushakov's fleet supported the allied attack on Naples.

== Popular culture ==
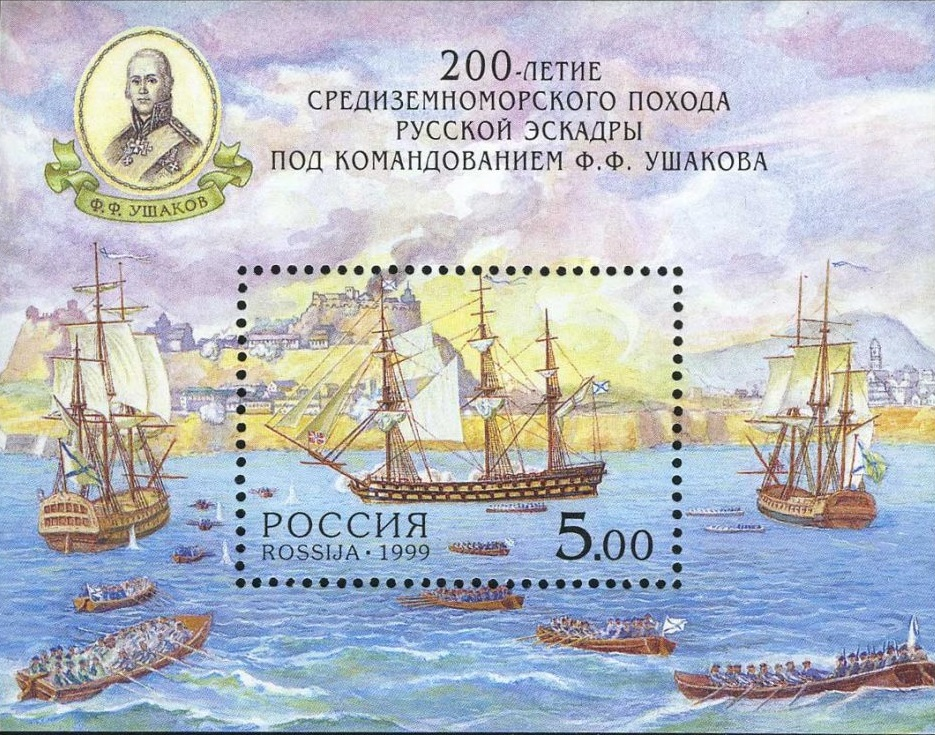
1999 postal stamp of Russia commemorating the siege

In 1953, director Mikhail Romm made a cinematographic dramatization of the Russian conquest of the Ionian Islands called Корабли штурмуют бастионы (The Ships Storm the Bastions), the second of a two-part biographical epic about Admiral Ushakov. The movie was released by Mosfilm.

== Sources ==
- Baeyens, Jacques (1973). Les Français à Corfou, 1797–1799 et 1807–1814 [The French in Corfu, 1797–1799 and 1807–1814] (in French). Athens: Institut français d'Athènes. OCLC 2763024.
- Jervis-White-Jervis, Henry, History of the island of Corfú and of the Republic of the Ionian islands, Colburn, London, 1852
- James, William M., The Naval History of Great Britain during the French Revolutionary Wars and Napoleonic Wars, volume 2, 1797–1799, first published 1822–24, reprinted by Conway Maritime Press, London, 2002
- Novikov, Nikolay Vasilyevich (1948). Боевая летопись русского флота [Battle chronicle of the Russian navy] (in Russian). Moscow: Военное издательство министерства вооруженных сил союза ССР.
- Russell, Quentin; Russell, Eugenia (30 September 2017). Ali Pasha, Lion of Ioannina: The Remarkable Life of the Balkan Napoleon. Pen and Sword. ISBN 978-1-4738-7722-1.
- Velichko, Konstantin I.; Novitsky, Vasily F.; Schwarz, Alexei V. von; Apushkin, Vladimir A.; Schulz, Gustav K. von (1913). Военная энциклопедия Сытина [Sytin Military Encyclopedia] (in Russian). Vol. 13: Кобленц – Круз. Moscow: Типография Т-ва И. Д. Сытина. pp. 207–209.
- Tashlykov, S. L. (2016). "КОРФУ ШТУРМ 1799". Great Russian Encyclopedia.
- Bodart, Gaston (1908). Militär-historisches Kriegs-Lexikon (1618–1905). C. W. Stern. p. 327.
