= Officeuse (1776 ship) =

History

France
- Name: Officieuse
- Builder: Le Havre by Jean-Joseph Ginoux
- Laid down: December 1775
- Launched: August 1776
- Completed: March 1778
- Fate: Wrecked November 1781

General characteristics
- Displacement: ~700 tonnes
- Tons burthen: 350-400 (bm)
- Length: 113 ft 2 in (34.5 m)
- Beam: 25 ft 0 in (7.6 m)
- Draught: 12 ft 6 in (3.8 m)
- Sail plan: Full-rigged ship
- Complement: 50-190
- Armament: Pierced for 20 or 24, carrying 16–20 × 6-pounder guns (w/40 shot per gun)

Officieuse was a storeship launched on 3 August 1776. The French Royal Navy lent her to the Compagnie de Guyane in September. She completed four voyages for the Compagnie, before wrecking on the fifth.

- January to July 1777: Le Havre, Tenerife, Gorée, Juda, Île du Prince (possibly Prince Edward Island, Cap-Français, Le Havre
- July 1778 to 1779: Rochefort, Lorient, Gorée, Groix, Guyanne, Rochefort
- August 1779 to end-1779: Rochefort to Senegal and return
- March 1780 to November: Rochefort to Guyane and return

During this last voyage she captured the British merchant vessel Arlequin (probably Harlequin), off Cayenne. However, in 1781 the British recaptured her. The captor was possibly HMS Belisarius, which captured the brig Harlequin on 7 December 1781.

In June 1781, Officeuse left Bordeaux for Senegal. In November she wrecked while crossing the bar at Casamance to escape HMS Leander, under Captain Thomas Shirley. Shirley reported that Officeuse was supposed to be worth £30,000.
