= Edward Berry =

Royal Navy officer (1768–1831)

Rear-Admiral of the Red Sir Edward Berry Bt KCB
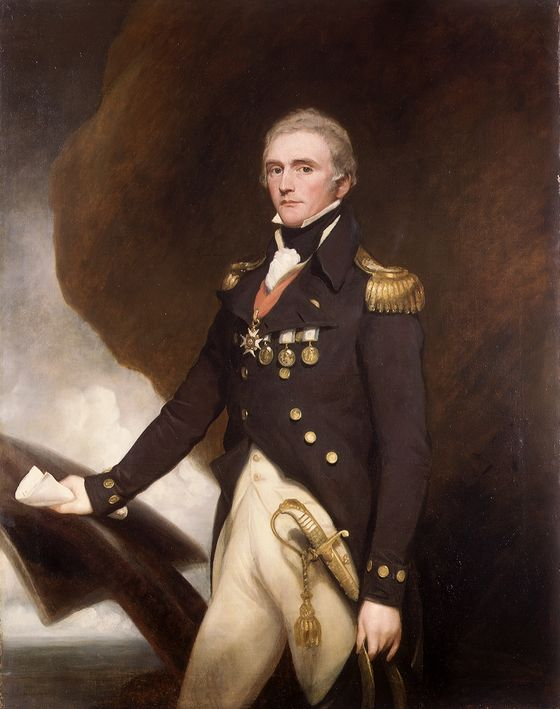
- c. 1815 portrait of Berry by John Singleton Copley
- Born: 17 April 1768; London, England
- Died: 13 February 1831 (aged 62); Bath, Somerset
- Relatives: Louisa Forster (wife)
- Military career
- Allegiance: Great Britain; United Kingdom
- Branch: Royal Navy
- Service years: 1779–1839
- Rank: Rear-Admiral of the Red
- Conflicts: French Revolutionary Wars; Battle of the Nile; Napoleonic Wars; Battle of Trafalgar; Battle of San Domingo
- Awards: Knight Commander of the Order of the Bath; Naval Gold Medal

Rear-Admiral of the Red Sir Edward Berry, 1st Baronet, KCB (17 April 1768 – 13 February 1831) was a Royal Navy officer who served in the French Revolutionary and Napoleonic Wars. He is best known for his role as flag captain of Horatio Nelson at the Battle of the Nile in 1798. Berry enjoyed a long and prestigious naval career and commanded HMS Agamemnon at the Battle of Trafalgar.

== Early life ==
Edward Berry was born in London on 17 April 1768, the son of a local merchant who died at an early age leaving a widow, five daughters and two sons in perilous financial circumstances. His early education was provided by his uncle, the Reverend Titus Berry, in Norwich. It was under the patronage of one of Titus's former pupils, Lord Mulgrave, that in 1779 Berry joined the Royal Navy as a volunteer aboard the Burford, at the age of 10.

== French Revolutionary Wars ==
1799 portrait of Berry

As a reward for his gallantry in boarding a French ship, Berry was promoted to lieutenant on 20 January 1794 and in May 1796 was appointed to HMS Agamemnon with Captain Nelson, whom he followed upon his move to HMS Captain in June. He soon won his commander's esteem, and in a letter to Admiral Sir John Jervis, Nelson wrote, 'I have as far as I have seen every reason to be satisfied with him [Berry], both as a gentleman and an officer'. On sending Nelson's report to the Admiralty, Jervis added 'Lieutenant Edward Berry, of whom the Commodore writes so highly, is a protégé of mine and I know him to be an officer of talents, great courage and laudable ambition'. Indeed, whilst Nelson was ashore during the siege of Porto Ferrajo, Berry commanded the ship in such a way as to make him the subject of his captain's 'fullest approbation', and he received the rank of commander on 12 November 1796.

Whilst awaiting a posting he remained aboard HMS Captain during the Battle of Cape St Vincent in February 1797. Although Berry had no specific duties during the battle, he again displayed his courage when Nelson came alongside the Spanish ship San Nicholas and gave orders to board her. Wrote Nelson, "The first man who jumped into the enemy's mizzen-chains was Captain Berry, late my first lieutenant; he was supported from our spritsail-yard, which hooked in the mizzen-rigging... Having pushed on to the quarter-deck, I found Captain Berry in possession of the poop, and the Spanish Ensign hauling down".

In October of the same year Nelson was invested as a Knight of the Bath, accompanied on the occasion by Berry. When the King remarked upon the loss of Nelson's right arm, he wittily replied, indicating Berry, "But not my right hand, your majesty". It was agreed between them that when Nelson next hoisted his flag, Berry would be his flag captain. With word of French plans to occupy Egypt, Nelson wrote to Berry in late 1797, 'If you mean to marry, I would recommend your doing it speedily, or the to-be Mrs. Berry will have very little of your company, for I am well, and you may expect to be called for every hour'. On 12 December Berry was indeed married to his cousin, Louisa Forster, and a week later appointed as flag captain of HMS Vanguard.

=== Battle of the Nile and afterward ===
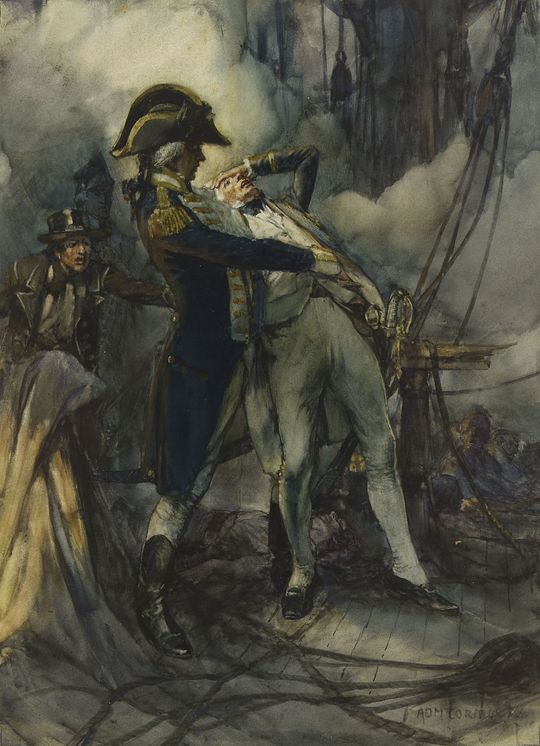
1919 illustration of Berry catching a wounded Nelson at the Nile by Arthur David McCormick

On 1 August 1798 the campaign culminated in the decisive Battle of the Nile, at Aboukir Bay. During this, Nelson was struck on the head by a piece of flying langrage and fell, bleeding heavily, only to be caught by Berry, to whom he uttered the words "I am killed. Remember me to my wife". His wound was slight, however, and he escaped with mild concussion. He was well enough that evening to witness the shattering explosion of the French battleship L'Orient. Only 4 of the 17 major French ships escaped destruction or capture and with French losses six times greater than those of the British, it was a triumphant victory.

After the battle, Thomas Hardy, commander of the corvette HMS Mutine, was promoted to captain of HMS Vanguard, and Berry embarked for Britain in HMS Leander, carrying Nelson's despatches. During the voyage, however, the Leander was accosted and captured by one of the two surviving French ships, the 74-gun Généreux, and Berry was severely wounded by a flying fragment of another man's skull, which was "driven through his arm". It was a bloody and courageous battle, as described by one of the main-deck gunners, Tim Stewart: "We fired everything at [the French] we could get hold of—crow-bars, nails, and all sorts... We killed nearly three hundred of them before we surrendered, and our brave captain ordered our colours to be hauled down."

As a result of his capture, Berry did not reach England until December, at which point the news of the Battle of the Nile had already been received. However, he wrote in a letter that upon his return to Norwich, "the people received me with mad joy. In short, I'm so great a man that I'm very in and out everywhere to the great annoyance of my pocket and distress of my feelings." Berry's account of the Battle, titled Authentic Narrative of the proceedings of his Majesty's squadron under the command of the Rear-Admiral Sir Horatio Nelson... drawn up from the minutes of an officer of rank in the squadron was subsequently published in The Sun and The True Briton newspapers, and became a bestseller in pamphlet form. Britain revelled in Nile memorabilia, including ceramic jugs embossed with reliefs of Nelson and Berry—'Heroes of the Nile'. On 12 December he was knighted and given the Freedom of the City of London. The ornate gold and enamel presentation box is part of the collection of the National Maritime Museum, Greenwich.

In the spring of 1799 he was appointed to HMS Foudroyant and sent to assist in the blockade of Malta. Here he assisted in the capture of Guillaume Tell and Généreux, the two French ships that escaped the Battle of the Nile, the latter being his own former captor. On 30 March, Berry wrote to Nelson from the Foudroyant, "My very dear Lord, had you been a partaker with me of the glory, every wish would have been gratified. How very often I went into your cabin, last night, to ask if we were doing right; for, I had nothing to act upon!..." This goes some way towards illustrating Berry's dependence upon Nelson and perhaps helps to explain his failure to cultivate a more successful later career. Nelson himself confided in a letter to his wife Frances a few months earlier, "I shall be worn to death by being obliged to fag and think of those things which... excellent Captain Hardy takes entirely from me." There is no doubting Berry's supreme gallantry and general amiability, but he had a certain reputation for blustering foolhardiness. It was Thomas Hardy and not Berry who would become Nelson's indispensable right-hand man. The following June, the Foudroyant carried the Queen of Naples from Palermo to Livorno, but a short time later Berry returned to England.

=== Later actions ===
It was five years before Berry again took significant command. His failure to obtain a posting had left him feeling restless and somewhat slighted by the Admiralty, "A man's standing in the Service and his reputation all goes for nought," he wrote bitterly. It fell to Nelson to placate him, "It is vexing to be unemployed at such a moment, but it is useless to fret oneself to death when the folks aloft don't care a pin about it." It took a change of leadership in the Admiralty to present Berry with the chance of another commission. Nelson: "I sincerely hope, now that a change has taken place, that you will get a ship. I attribute none of the tyrannical conduct of the late Board to Lord St Vincent... he was dreadfully ill-advised."

The end to Berry's yearnings came on his arrival at Trafalgar in 1805, captain of HMS Agamemnon. "Here comes that fool Berry! Now we shall have a battle," exclaimed Nelson. Berry had rather a reputation as a fighter, though perhaps not as a master tactician, "Captain Codrington of HMS Orion found some wry amusement in seeing Berry in the Agamemnon blazing away for all he was worth, apparently at friend and foe alike", notes Oliver Warner in A Portrait of Lord Nelson. "It was typical of Berry's luck that, having long and restlessly awaited a new ship, he should have been given the Agamemnon, before having the infinite happiness of joining Nelson on the eve of his greatest battle."

Following a close escape from capture on her outward voyage, the Agamemnon had no particular opportunities for distinction at Trafalgar, and escaped the mêlée without heavy losses, engaging with the Santissima Trinidad and Admiral Dumanoir's division in the closing stages of the fight. At the battle's close, Berry took to his ship's boat in order to speak to Nelson on the Victory but by the time he arrived Nelson had just died, an unfortunate piece of timing which Berry would regret for the rest of his life. In 1806, Berry commanded Agamemnon at the Battle of San Domingo, being highly praised for his actions. That same year he became a baronet and he remained in sea service throughout the war, subsequently commanding Sceptre during 1811, Barfleur the following year and one of the Royal Yachts.

== Arms ==
Coat of arms of Sir Edward Berry, Bt
Crest On a wreath, between two wings elevated Ermine, an eagle's head couped at the neck Proper, gorged with an eastern crown Or, in the beak a palm branch Vert. Escutcheon Ermine, on a fess, engrailed Azure three fleur-de-lys Or, in chief two branches of palm in saltier Vert, in base a sphinx couchant Proper. Motto Per ardua

== Later life and death ==
He bought a house in Norwich in 1814. On 2 January 1815 he was made a Knight Commander of the Order of the Bath and on 19 July 1821 he became a rear admiral. During these years, despite constant entreaties to the Admiralty, he never took up further important postings. However, his record can be seen as exceptional. He was, with Nelson and Collingwood, one of only three Royal Naval officers to receive three Naval Gold Medals, having commanded a ship of the line at the Nile, Trafalgar and San Domingo. Following several years of severe illness and extreme debility, he died on 13 February 1831 at his residence in Bath and was buried in a nearby churchyard where his grave can still be seen at St Swithin's Church, Walcot, Bath. As he left no children, his baronetcy became extinct with his death.

Baronetage of the United Kingdom
New creation	Baronet (of Catton); 1806–1831	Extinct
Preceded by Thompson baronets	Berry baronets of Catton; 12 December 1806	Succeeded by Bateman baronets
