= HMS Leander (1780) =

Portland-class fourth-rate of the Royal Navy

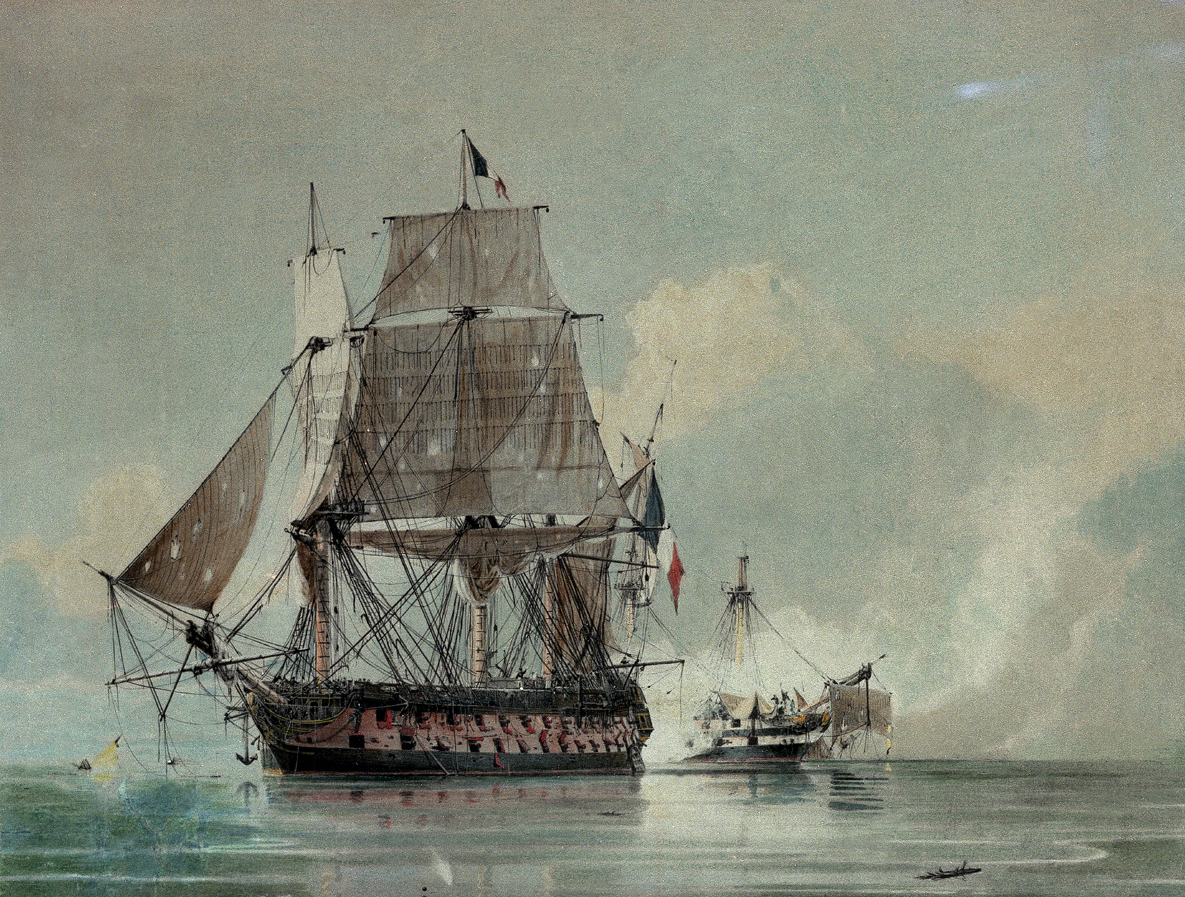
- Leander (right) at the action of 18 August 1798

History

Great Britain
- Name: HMS Leander
- Namesake: Hero and Leander
- Ordered: 21 June & 25 July 1776
- Builder: Chatham Dockyard, M/Shipwright Israel Pownoll to April 1779; completed by Nicholas Phillips
- Laid down: 1 March 1777
- Launched: 1 July 1780
- Honours and awards: Naval General Service Medal with clasp "Nile"
- Fate: Captured 18 August 1798 by the French Navy

France
- Name: Leander
- Acquired: By capture 18 August 1798
- Captured: 3 March 1799 by the Russian Navy
- Fate: Returned to the Royal Navy

Great Britain
- Name: HMS Leander
- Acquired: Returned by Russian Navy
- Renamed: Hygeia, in 1813
- Reclassified: Converted to hospital ship 1813
- Fate: Sold 1817

General characteristics
- Type: 50-gun fourth-rate
- Tons burthen: 1,052 46/94 (bm)
- Length: 146 ft 0 in (44.5 m) (overall); 119 ft 7 3/4 in (36.5 m) (keel)
- Beam: 40 ft 8 in (12.4 m)
- Draught: 17 ft 5 in (5.3 m)
- Sail plan: Full-rigged ship
- Armament: Lower deck: 22 × 24-pounder guns; Upper deck: 22 × 12-pounder guns; QD: 4 × 6-pounder guns; Fc: 2 × 6-pounder guns

HMS Leander was a 50-gun Portland-class fourth-rate ship of the line of the Royal Navy. Launched at Chatham Dockyard on 1 July 1780, she served in West Africa, the West Indies and Halifax, Nova Scotia. During the French Revolutionary Wars, Leander participated in the Battle of the Nile before a French ship captured her in the action of 18 August 1798. Russo-Ottoman forces recaptured her at the siege of Corfu and returned her to the British in 1799. On 23 February 1805, Leander captured the French frigate Ville de Milan and recaptured her prize, HMS Cleopatra. On 25 April 1806, a warning shot fired by Leander unintentionally killed an American seaman. The resulting Leander affair contributed to the worsening of Anglo-American relations. In 1813, the Admiralty converted Leander to a hospital ship under the name Hygeia. Hygeia was sold in 1817.

== Early service ==
She was commissioned in June 1780 under Captain Thomas Shirley. (Note: She was the first Royal Navy vessel to be named for the Leander of the Greek myth of Hero and Leander.) Leander cruised for some time in the North Sea.

At the end of 1781, Leander and the sloop-of-war HMS Alligator sailed for the Dutch Gold Coast with a convoy, consisting of a few merchant-vessels and transports. Britain was at war with the Dutch Republic and Shirley launched an unsuccessful attack on 17 February on the Dutch outpost at Elmina, being repulsed four days later. Leander and Shirley then went on to capture the small Dutch forts at Moree (Fort Nassau – 20 guns), Kormantine (Courmantyne or Fort Amsterdam – 32 guns; 6 March), Apam (Fort Lijdzaamheid or Fort Patience – 22 guns; 16 March), Senya Beraku (Berricoe, Berku, Fort Barracco or Fort Goede Hoop – 18 guns; 23 March), and Accra (Fort Crèvecœur or Ussher Fort – 32 guns; 30 March). Leander also destroyed the French store-ship Officeuse, off Senegal, supposed to be worth £30,000. Shirley garrisoned those facilities with personnel from Cape Coast.

Shirley sent two sets of dispatches back to Britain. One set went in the transport sloop Ulysses, which was under the command of Captain Frodsham. The French frigate Fée captured Ulysses and took her into Brest, but not before her captain had weighted the dispatches and thrown them overboard. Shirley's first lieutenant, Mr. Van court, took the second set in the cartel transport Mackerel, which also carried the Dutch governors of the forts to Europe.

Shirley then sailed to the West Indies where towards the end of 1782 as senior captain he became commanding officer prior to the arrival of Admiral Hugh Pigot. Pigot promoted him to captain of the 90-gun HMS Union.

Pigot appointed Captain John Willet Payne to replace Shirley. On 18 January 1783, Leander was escorting a cartel when the two vessels encountered a large French warship at midnight. After an inconclusive engagement of two hours, Leander and her opponent separated. Pigot reported that the French vessel was probably a 74-gun ship of the line. Furthermore, rumour had it that she was the Couronne and that she had gone on to Puerto Rico. On 4 March, Leander captured the brig Bella Juditta. Leander was one of the five warships and the armed storeship Sally that shared in the proceeds of the capture on 23 March of the ship Arend op Zee. Captain J. Reynolds took command briefly in 1784 before Leander was paid-off in Portsmouth in April.

She was recommissioned in August 1786, after repairs in 1785. Captain Sir James Barclay commissioned Leander in August 1786 and then sailed her for Nova Scotia on 9 April 1787. She served as flagship for Sir Herbert Sawyer in 1788 until paid off in September. Captain Joseph Peyton, Jr. immediately recommissioned her as the flagship for his father Rear-Admiral Joseph Peyton, Sr. She sailed for the Mediterranean on 22 December.

== French Revolutionary and Napoleonic Wars ==
Leander was recommissioned in May 1795 under Captain Maurice Delgano and assigned to guard British merchantmen trading with Portugal. On the night of 12 December Leander was steering out from the port of Lisbon in a heavy gale when she collided with Commerce, a British transport with a 13-man crew and a cargo of ammunition. The smaller vessel sank within minutes with eleven of the crew drowned. A spar from Leader's main mast was shaken loose by the collision and fell into the sea; the remaining two crew from Commerce used this piece of timber to stay afloat until they were rescued.

On 12 May 1796, she was part of Admiral Duncan's squadron, when HMS Phoenix, of the squadron, captured the Dutch frigate Argo and the brig Mercury. The Royal Navy took both Argo and Mercury into service: Argo became HMS Janus and Mercury became HMS Hermes. Leander shared by agreement in the proceeds of the capture of the Vrow Hendrica, captured on 22 October.

In November 1796, Leander came under the command of Captain Thomas Boulden Thompson. She then escorted a convoy to Gibraltar on 7 January 1797.

Leander joined the Mediterranean Fleet under Earl St Vincent, and was assigned to the squadron under Horatio Nelson. Thompson took part in Nelson's attack on Santa Cruz in July 1797. Thompson was among the leaders of the landing parties, under the overall direction of Nelson and Thomas Troubridge. Wind hampered the initial attempts to force a landing; the Spanish defenders immediately subjected the successful landing in the evening of 22 July to heavy fire. Still, Thompson's party were able to advance and spike several of the enemy's cannon. However, the British forces had become dispersed throughout the town, and were forced to negotiate a truce to allow them to withdraw. Thompson himself was wounded in the battle. Leander lost seven men killed, 6 wounded (including Thompson), and one missing.

=== Nile ===
Under Captain Thomas Thompson Leander took part in the Battle of the Nile on 1 August 1798. She was able to exploit a gap in the French line and anchor between Peuple Souverain and Franklin, from which position she raked both enemy ships while protected from their broadsides. In the battle she suffered only 14 men wounded.

=== Capture ===
Carrying Nelson's dispatches from the Nile and accompanied by Sir Edward Berry, Leander encountered the 74-gun French third rate Généreux off Crete on 18 August 1798. In the subsequent action, Leander lost 35 men killed and 57 wounded, including Thompson. The French suffered 100 killed and 180 wounded, but captured Leander. The French took her into service under her existing name.

The French treated the prisoners badly and plundered almost everything but the clothes the British had on their backs. When Thompson remonstrated with Captain Lejoille of Généreux, Lejoille answered nonchalantly, "J'en suis fâché, mais le fait est, que les Français sont bons au pillage." ("I'm sorry about that, but the fact is, the French are good at pillaging.") They refused treatment for Thompson, who had been badly wounded. Leander's surgeon, Mr. Mulberry, was able to remove a musket ball from Thompson's arm only after the vessels reached Corfu on 1 September and he was smuggled aboard the vessel where the French were holding Thompson. Most of the officers returned to Britain on parole but the French detained a number of seamen, and in particular Thomas Jarrat, the carpenter, after he refused to reveal to them the dimensions of Leander's masts and spars. Captain Lejoille tried, albeit unsuccessfully, to get some of the British crew that he had detained to assist him when a Russo-Ottoman fleet appeared off Corfu. The British refused.

The subsequent court-martial aboard HMS America at Sheerness most honourably acquitted Thompson, his officers, and his crew. The court also thanked Berry for the assistance he gave during the battle. As Thompson was rowed back to shore, the crews of all the ships at Sheerness saluted him with three cheers. He was subsequently knighted and awarded a pension of £200 per annum.

Leander was at Corfu when a joint Russian and Ottoman force besieged the island. On 28 February 1799, the Russians and Ottomans attacked Vido, a small island (less than a kilometer across) at the mouth of the port of Corfu. A four-hour bombardment by several ships suppressed all five shore batteries on the island. Leander and the corvette Brune tried to intervene but were damaged and forced to retreat to the protection of the batteries of Corfu.

The Russo-Ottoman forces recaptured Leander and Brune when Corfu capitulated to them on 3 March 1799. (Note: The French classified Brune as a corvette, and the terms of capitulation refer to her as a corvette. However, she was rated as carrying 28 guns and so would qualify as a frigate in British parlance.) The Russians returned Leander to the Royal Navy. They also gave Brune to the Ottomans.

=== Return to British service ===
Leander was recommissioned in the Mediterranean under Commander Adam Drummond in June 1799. In September Captain Michael Halliday took command.

From July 1801 to June 1802, she refitted at Deptford. She recommissioned in May under Captain James Oughton as flagship for Vice-Admiral Sir Andrew Mitchell.

In July, she sailed for Halifax. Captain Francis Fane took command a year later, in August 1803, with Captain Alexander Skene replacing him in November. On 16 August 1804, Leander was in company with HMS Cambrian when they recaptured Hibberts.

She then had three more captains within the year: George Ralph Collier, Oughton again, and from November, John Talbot.

On 23 February 1805, while on the Halifax station, Leander discovered the French frigate Ville de Milan, under Captain Pierre Guillet, and the British Cleopatra, which Ville de Milan had captured the day before. The engagement between Ville de Milan and Cleopatra had left both ships greatly damaged. Consequently, when they encountered Leander they struck to Leander without a fight. Leander came upon Cleopatra first, and as soon as she struck, the British prisoners on board her, i.e., her original crew, took possession of her. She then followed Leander towards Ville de Milan, which too struck. The Navy took Ville de Milan into service as HMS Milan. (Note: The prize money for Ville de Milan for a petty officer was £1 19s 6d; for an able seaman it was 9s 6d.)

On 3 June, Leander captured Nancy. (Note: The final prize money payment for Nancy was £1 10s 10d for a petty officer, and 6s 11d for an able seaman.) Three days later she captured Elizabeth. The next day Leander captured Volunteer. On 12 October, Leander captured Vengeance. (Note: The prize money for Vengeance for a petty officer was £1 4s 0d; for an able seaman it was 5s.) At some point Leander pressed a seaman from the crew of Juverna, which was returning to England from Suriname where she had delivered a cargo of slaves.

Thereafter, in recognition of the capture of Ville de Milan and the recapture of Cleopatra, the Admiralty promoted Talbot to command of ship of the line Centaur.

== Leander affair ==
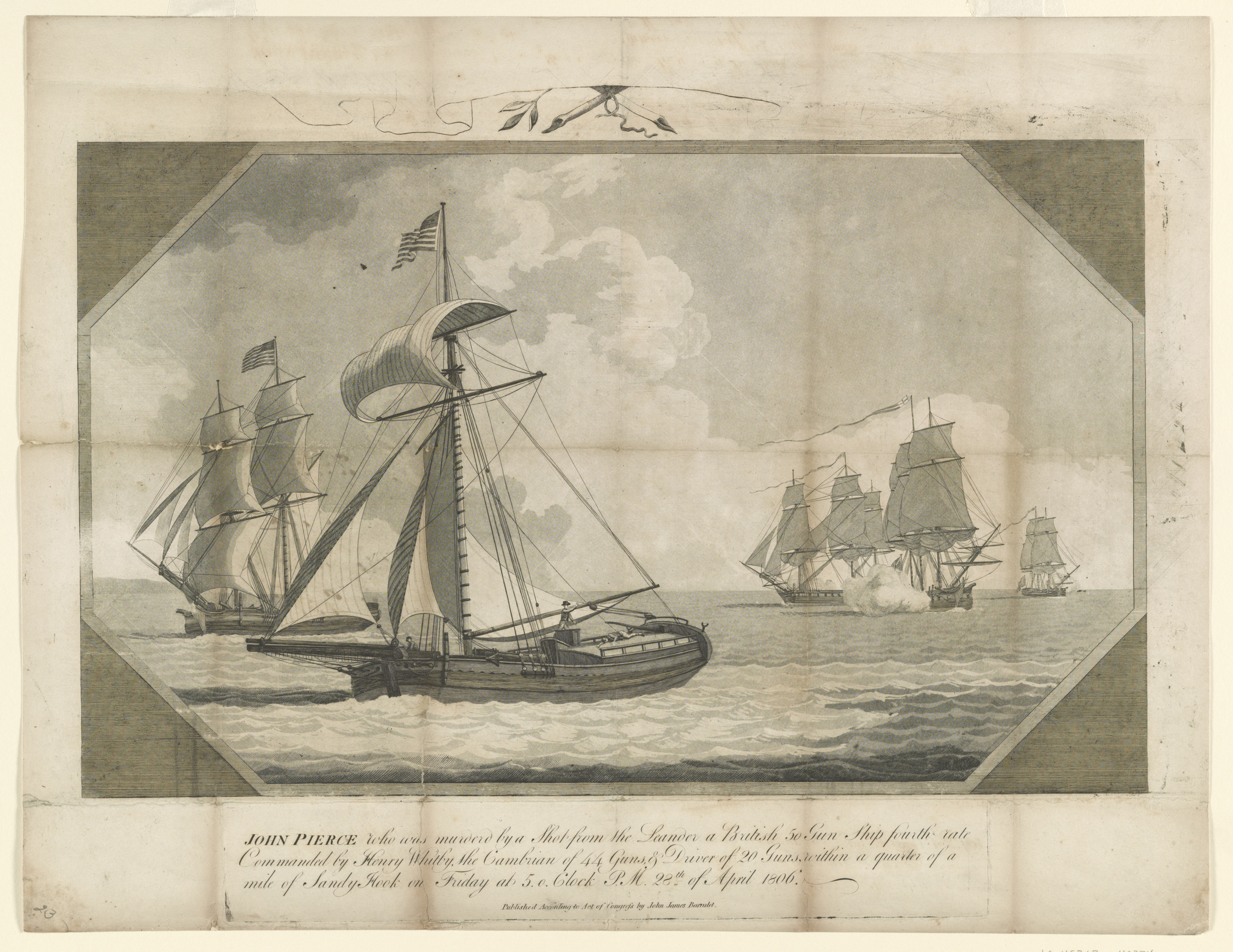
An engraving depicting the incident.

Leander subsequently came under the command of Captains William Lyall and Henry Whitby. Leander, HMS Driver under Slingsby Simpson and HMS Cambrian under John Nairne, were stationed off Sandy Hook, New Jersey to keep an eye on two French frigates which had taken refuge in the harbour. Beginning in the summer of 1804, the three ships began stopping all American merchantmen heading into New York just outside the United States's three-mile territorial limit, and searching them for contraband French goods. If contraband was found, the ship was detained and taken to Halifax.

On 25 April 1806, Leander fired a warning shot over the bow of an American merchantman, signalling it to stop. The cannonball passed into the harbour, decapitating John Pierce, the helmsman of the coastal sloop Richard. The sloop's captain, who was Pierce's brother, made his way to New York and gathered a mob that paraded Pierce's corpse through the city's streets. On 26 April, an angry mob seized the provisions of a provisioning party from Leander returning to their ship; Leander, Driver and Cambrian detained the American merchantman Aurora on the same day. Protest meetings were held over the incident, and four of Leander's officers were imprisoned by local authorities for their own protection before being secretly released.

On 14 June, President Thomas Jefferson issued a proclamation that ordered Leander, Driver and Cambrian out of American waters and forbade them ever to return. He extended the same prohibition to all vessels that Whitby, Simpson and Nairne might command. Whitby was court martialed in England on the charge of murdering Pierce, and was acquitted. In May, Captain Salusbury Pryce Humphreys took command of Leander at Halifax as she became the flagship for Admiral George Berkeley. Captain Richard Raggett then sailed her back to Britain in 1807.

== Fate ==
By 1807, Leander was out of commission at Portsmouth. In 1808, she was in Plymouth. In October 1810, Leander was fitted as a medical depot ship at Portsmouth. In 1813, the Admiralty commissioned a new Leander (1813) so the old Leander was given the name Hygeia. Hygeia was sold on 14 April 1817 to a Mr. Thomas for £2,100.
