= French frigate Alceste (1780) =

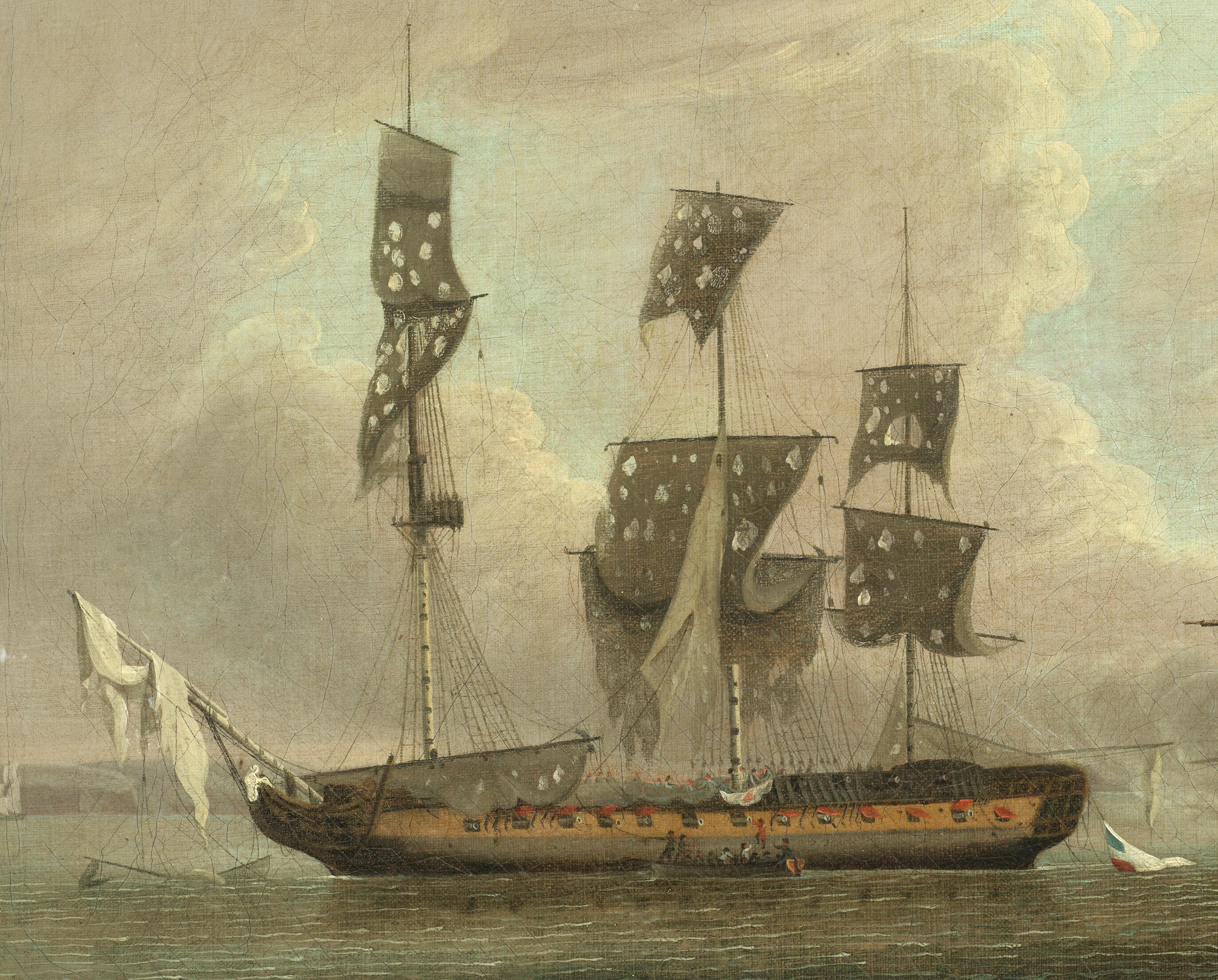
- Réunion, Alceste's sister ship

History

France
- Name: Alceste
- Ordered: 20 April 1780
- Builder: Toulon shipyard
- Laid down: May 1780
- Launched: 28 October 1780
- Commissioned: February 1781
- Captured: by Britain, 29 August 1793

Kingdom of Sardinia
- Name: Alceste
- Acquired: 29 August 1793
- Captured: By Boussole on 8 June 1794

France
- Name: Alceste
- Acquired: 8 June 1794
- Captured: By HMS Bellona, 18 June 1799

Great Britain
- Name: Alceste
- Acquired: 18 June 1799
- Fate: Floating battery (1801); broken up in May 1802

General characteristics
- Class & type: Magicienne-class frigate
- Displacement: 1,100 tonneaux
- Tons burthen: 600 port tonneaux; 932 (bm)
- Length: 44.2 m (145 ft 0 in)
- Beam: 11.2 m (36 ft 9 in)
- Draught: 5.2 m (17 ft 1 in) (22 French feet)
- Complement: 240 in British service; 96 as a floating battery
- Armament: 26 × 12-pounder long guns + 6 × 6-pounder long guns

Alceste was a Magicienne-class frigate of the French Navy, launched in 1780, that the British seized at the Siege of Toulon. They transferred her to the Kingdom of Sardinia, but the French recaptured her a year later in the action of 8 June 1794. The British captured her again at the action of 18 June 1799 and took her into service as HMS Alceste. In 1801 she became a floating battery and she was sold the next year.

== Career ==
At the outbreak of the French Revolution, Alceste served in the Mediterranean until she was put in the reserved and disarmed in Toulon. The royalist insurrection found her there; the British, who supported the royalists, seized her and transferred her to the Kingdom of Sardinia before the conclusion of the Siege of Toulon.

The 32-gun Boudeuse recaptured her in the action of 8 June 1794. The French then took her back into French service. On 4 August 1794 Alceste and Vestale were off Cape Bon when they encountered and captured the brig HMS Scout. The French took Scout into service under existing name, but she wrecked on 12 December 1795 off Cadiz.

Under Captain Louis-Jean-Nicolas Lejoille, Alceste was part of Admiral Martin's squadron, which captured HMS Berwick in 1795.

Jean Joseph Hubert took command of Alceste on 31 March 1795. She took part in the Battle of Hyères Islands, where she battled several British ships before rescuing Alcide.

In March 1796, Alceste ferried Jean-Baptiste Annibal Aubert du Bayet to his appointment as ambassador to Constantinople, along with military advisors.

From November 1796 to January 1797, Alceste patrolled the coasts of Italy under Captain Jean-François-Timothée Trullet.

She took part in the Expédition d'Égypte under Jean-Baptiste Barré, ferrying General Jean Reynier, and was later appointed to a squadron under Admiral Jean-Baptiste Perrée, which also comprised the frigates Junon and Alceste, and Courageuse, and the brigs Salamine and Alerte. In the action of 18 June 1799, HMS Bellona captured Alceste.

== Fate ==
The Royal Navy commissioned Alceste under Commander Thomas Bayley, who shortly thereafter received promotion to post captain in March 1800. She arrived at Chatham on 4 April. There she was registered as a sloop in July 1801 and fitted as a floating battery in August. She was sold at Sheerness on 20 May 1802 for £1,445.

== See also ==
- List of ships captured in the 18th century
