= Louis François Jean Chabot =

French general (1757–1837)

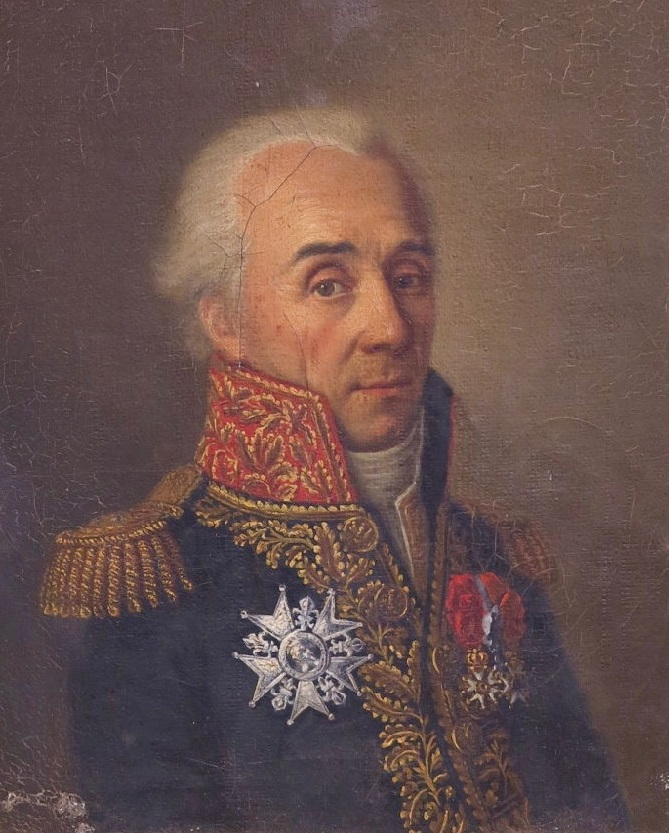
General of Division Louis François Jean Chabot

Louis François Jean Chabot (English: /ʃæˈboʊ/ sha-BOH, French: [lwi fʁɑ̃swa ʒɑ̃ ʃabo]; 27 April 1757 in Niort – 11 March 1837 in Sansais) was a French general. He was in charge of the French forces at the Siege of Corfu (1798–99) when a combined Russian and Ottoman force captured the island.

== See also ==
- List of French generals of the Revolutionary and Napoleonic Wars

== Sources ==
- Six, Georges (1934). Dictionnaire biographique des généraux et amiraux de la Révolution et de l'Empire, Vol. I (in French). Paris, France: Librairie historique et nobiliaire. ISBN 978-2-402-49916-3.
