= William James (naval historian) =

British lawyer and naval historian (1780–1827)

- Born: 1780
- Died: 28 May 1827 (aged 46–47); South Lambeth, London, England
- Occupations: Lawyer; military historian
- Writing career
- Pen name: Boxer
- Period: 1816–1827
- Genre: Military history
- Subjects: Naval warfare, War of 1812, Royal Navy

William James (1780 – 28 May 1827) was a British lawyer and military historian who wrote important histories of the military engagements of the British with the French and Americans from 1793 through the 1820s.

== Career ==
Although little is known of his early life, William James was trained in the law and began his career as an attorney. He practised before the Supreme Court of Jamaica and served as a proctor in the Vice-Admiralty Court of Jamaica from 1801 to 1813. In 1812, when war broke out between Great Britain and the United States, James was in the United States. Detained by American authorities as a British national, he escaped to Halifax, Nova Scotia, in 1813.

This experience interested him in the War of 1812 and he began to write about it, particularly defending the reputation of the Royal Navy and pointing out the factual errors and excessive claims that American reports made against the Royal Navy. His initial literary efforts seem to have been letters written to the editor of the Naval Chronicle under the pen name 'Boxer'. In 1816, he published his first pamphlet, An inquiry into the merits of the principal naval actions between Great Britain and the United States. This pamphlet caused a controversy in the United States, leading to much American criticism of James's views. (Note: '15 August 1818. They are written with considerable ability, and with extreme and anxious labour to exalt the naval and military character of Great Britain by the events of the late war [of 1812], and to depress that of the American people.')

James went on to write his six-volume Naval History of Great Britain, 1793 – 1827 in reaction to American accounts of the War of 1812. Similar in approach, this work was highly critical of the history that his contemporary Captain Edward Pelham Brenton had written on the subject and led to controversy between them that is reflected in successive editions of their works.

James's legal background would influence his approach to obtaining evidence. He attempted, therefore, and managed to board American warships and speak to their crews, to verify their characteristics at first hand. In this pursuit he noted, for example, that the USS Constitution was not only much larger, but also more heavily manned and armed, than HMS Guerriere – contrary to previous American claims that the ships had been equal at the time of their engagement. More alleged erroneous American assertions were dealt with. Equally, James was not shy to criticise British officers as well, where he saw fit.

James died in South Lambeth, London, in 1827, but his works continued to be published. Captain Frederick Chamier expanded the work in 1837 to include the Burmese War and the Battle of Navarino. The book remained a major reference work and was so often consulted that the Navy Records Society published an index to the history in 1895, which is now available on the Internet.

== Debate ==
Theodore Roosevelt, as a young Harvard University undergraduate in 1876–77, began work on a response from the American perspective. Published in 1882 as The Naval War of 1812, the book took James to task for what Roosevelt perceived as glaring mistakes and outright misrepresentations of fact based on malicious anti-American bias and shabby research, despite James's painstaking research and primary sources. In places, Roosevelt becomes almost mocking in his criticism of James. The book's conclusions have been disputed by Professor Andrew Lambert in his 2012 book The Challenge: Britain Against America in the Naval War of 1812. Scholars further note that Roosevelt's effort did not actually refer to James's two books on the War of 1812. Instead, Roosevelt referred to James's Naval History series, which holds only a shortened version. That avoidance of James's arguments and detailed evidence of 1817 and 1818 is seen by some as largely undermining Roosevelt's critique of James's work. Moreover, Roosevelt is also accused of ignoring the earlier American claims that provoked James’s errors in the first place, claims that might be best understood to be beneficial to American morale at the time. James's primary conclusion – that no American vessel of equal force ever captured a British ship – essentially remains unchallenged.

Ian W. Toll's Six Frigates, in 2006, cites Roosevelt's purpose as not only revealing James's distortions and fabrications but also showing James's American contemporaries as being equally guilty of being culpable of the same distortions and fabrications. (Note: Roosevelt's observation. 'Latour is the only trustworthy American contemporary historian of this war, and even he at times absurdly exaggerates the British force and loss, Most of the other American "histories" of that period were the most preposterously bombastic works that ever saw print. But as regards this battle, none of them are as bad as even such British historians as Alison... Almost all British writers underestimate their own force and enormously magnify that of the Americans.') In his book, Roosevelt stated:

"And it must always be remembered that a victory, honourably won, if even over a weaker foe, does reflect credit on the nation by whom it is gained. It was creditable to us as a nation that our ships were better made and better armed then the British frigates ... Some of my countrymen will consider this but scant approbation, to which the answer must be that a history is not a panegyric."

== Published works ==
- An Inquiry into the merits of the principal naval actions between Great Britain and the United States : comprising an account of all British and American ships of war captured and destroyed since 18 June 1812 (Halifax: Holland, 1816).
- A full and correct account of the chief naval occurrences of the late war between Great Britain and the United States of America : preceded by a cursory examination of the American accounts of their naval actions fought previous to that period (London: T. Egerton, 1817); (London: Conway Maritime Press, 2002).
- A Full and Correct Account of the Military Occurrences of the late war between Great Britain and the United States of America; with an appendix and plates. Two volumes. London: Printed for the Author, 1818.
- Warden refuted; being a defence of the British navy against the misrepresentations of a work ... entitled, “A statistical ... account of the United States of North America,” by D. B. Warden, ... in a letter to the author of that work (London, 1819).
- The naval history of Great Britain from the declaration of war by France in February 1793 to the accession of George IV in January 1820 : with an account of the origin and progressive increase of the British Navy ... Five volumes (London Baldwin, Cradock & Joy, 1822–24); New edition in Six volumes ... and an account of the Burmese War and the battle of Navarino. (London: R. Bentley, 1837); (London: Richard Bentley, 1847); (London: Richard Bentley, 1859); (London: Richard Bentley, 1860); (London: Richard Bentley & Son, 1886); (London: Macmillan, 1902); (London: Conway Maritime Press, 2002).
  William James's six-volume set is now in the public domain and available in Ebook form (New edition with preface first published in London, April 1859):
  - James, William (1902). The naval history of Great Britain (1448–1796). Vol. 1 (New six volume ed.). London: Macmillan.
  - James, William (1902). The naval history of Great Britain (1797–1800). Vol. 2 (New six volume ed.). London: Macmillan.
  - James, William (1902). The naval history of Great Britain (1800–1805). Vol. 3 (New six volume ed.). London: Macmillan.
  - James, William (1902). The naval history of Great Britain (1805–1809). Vol. 4 (New six volume ed.). London: Macmillan.
  - James, William (1902). The naval history of Great Britain (1809–1813). Vol. 5 (New six volume ed.). London: Macmillan.
  - James, William (1902). The naval history of Great Britain (1813–1827). Vol. 6 (New six volume ed.). London: Macmillan.

== See also ==
- Bibliography of 18th–19th century Royal Naval history

== Bibliography ==
- Adams, John Quincy (1928). The Diary Of John Quincy Adams 1794-1845. New York: Charles Scribner and Sons – via archive.org.
- H. Furber, 'How William James came to be a naval Historian', American Historical Review, vol. 38 (1932–33), pp. 74–85.
- Andrew Lambert, introduction to 2002 and 2004 editions of James's works, as listed above.
- Andrew Lambert, The Challenge: America Against Britain in the Naval War of 1812 (London: Faber & Faber Limited, 2012).
- John Knox Laughton, revised by Andrew Lambert, 'James, William (d. 1827)' in Oxford Dictionary of National Biography (2004).
- Lambert, Andrew (2004), 'Introduction', in William James, Naval Occurrences of The War of 1812: A Full and Correct Account of the Naval War between Great Britain and the United States of America, 1812–1815 (London: Conway Maritime Press), pp. I-V.
- Roosevelt, Theodore (1900). The Naval War of 1812. Vol. II. Annapolis: Naval Institute Press.
- Toll, Ian W. (2006) Six Frigates (W.W. Norton & Company)
