= John Hayes (Royal Navy officer, died 1838) =

British Royal Navy officer

Rear-Admiral John Hayes CB
- Born: 22 January 1768 (baptism); Greenwich Kent
- Died: 7 April 1838 (aged 70); Southsea, Hampshire
- Military career
- Allegiance: United Kingdom
- Branch: Royal Navy
- Service years: 1787 to 1838
- Rank: Royal Navy Rear-Admiral
- Nickname: "Magnificent Hayes"
- Conflicts: French Revolutionary War; Action of 31 July 1793; Napoleonic Wars; Walcheren Expedition; Action of 2 February 1814; Action of 13 December 1814
- Awards: Companion of the Order of the Bath

Rear-Admiral John Hayes CB (1767 or 1775 – 7 April 1838) was a prominent British Royal Navy officer of the late eighteenth and early nineteenth centuries. Hayes was best known for his skill at seamanship and his interest in the design and construction of naval vessels, beginning with his childhood education at Deptford Dockyard where his uncle Adam was a master shipbuilder. During his naval service he participated in the first and the last significant frigate actions of the French Revolutionary and Napoleonic Wars, from the inconclusive engagement between Embuscade and HMS Boston in 1793 and the capture of USS President in 1815. After the war's end, Hayes was appointed as superintendent of HMNB Devonport and later was commander in chief off West Africa.

== Life ==
John Hayes was baptised on 22 Jan. 1768 at St Nicholas, Deptford in Kent, the eldest son of George Hayes, "Master Boat Builder of Union St" and his wife Elizabeth (Simpson). His father died in 1779.His great-uncle was Adam Hayes, Master Shipbuilder at Deptford Dockyard. Adam Hayes ensured that his great-nephew was entered on the books of various ships from the age of seven: this legal loophole allowed John Hayes to develop necessary seniority without actually serving at sea. Instead, John Hayes was educated at the dockyard.

== Naval service ==
In 1787, Hayes was sent to the ship of the line HMS Orion under Sir Hyde Parker. In 1790 he moved to the frigate HMS Pearl under Captain George Courtenay and followed Courtenay to HMS Boston in 1793 after the outbreak of the French Revolutionary Wars. Within months, Boston was engaged in action with the French frigate Embuscade at the action of 31 July 1793. Embuscade had been anchored in New York City harbour, and Courtenay sent an offer of battle in to Captain Jean-Baptiste-François Bompart, who sailed out to meet him. In the ensuing engagement, Courtenay was killed and Boston badly damaged. The ship was eventually forced to flee before Embuscade, escaping into the Atlantic.

Despite the inconclusive end to the engagement, Hayes was promoted on his return to Britain and joined HMS Dido under Captain Sir Charles Hamilton, moving with Hamilton to St Fiorenzo in the Mediterranean shortly afterwards. In 1799, while serving in the West Indies, Hayes was promoted to commander and in 1802 became a post captain. For the next seven years he remained in reserve, before taking command of the ship of the line HMS Alfred in 1809, assisting in the evacuation of troops from Galicia, Spain following the Battle of Corunna. Later in the year he served in the Walcheren Expedition in HMS Achille and then moved to HMS Freija in the West Indies in December 1809, almost immediately participating in the action of 18 December 1809 and the invasion of Guadeloupe.

In 1812, Hayes moved to command HMS Magnificent off Brest, and in her gained fame for keeping his ship steady during a gale while anchored in the Basque Roads. The wind was so fierce that Magnificent lost both anchors and was almost driven onto rocks. Only an extremely skillful act of seamanship from Hayes saved Magnificent and her crew from the rocks, and Hayes was afterwards known as the "Magnificent Hayes". In response to a string of British defeats by powerful American frigates at the start of the War of 1812, Hayes suggested that several old ships of the line be razeed to create 56-gun ships. The idea was accepted and Hayes given command of one of the razees, HMS Majestic. Although the razees did not meet any American frigates directly, Majestic did encounter the Terpsichore at the action of 2 February 1814, and defeated her in a lengthy engagement, the French ship sinking soon afterwards. The following year, Hayes was present at the capture of USS President, but Majestic was not closely engaged.

== Post-war service ==
After the end of the war, Hayes was made a Companion of the Order of the Bath and in 1819 was appointed superintendent of HMNB Devonport, remaining at the post for some years and taking an active role in the design and development of new ships, publishing a number of well received pamphlets on the subject. In 1829 he was given command of HMS Ganges at Portsmouth and the following year moved to HMS Dryad as Commodore of the West Africa station. In 1832 he returned to Europe and in 1837 was promoted to rear-admiral. He died the following year at Southsea, Hampshire and was buried in Farlington.

== Personal life ==
Hayes married Elizabeth Caroline Pye at St Mary Newington on 28 January 1806 and had a number of children, two of whom later became admirals in the Royal Navy, Courtenay Osborn Hayes and John Montagu Hayes.
