= James Nicoll Morris =

British Royal Navy officer (1763–1830)

Vice-Admiral Sir James Nicoll Morris KCB
- Born: 1763
- Died: 15 April 1830 (aged 66); Marlow, Buckinghamshire
- Spouse: Margaretta Sarah Somers Cocks
- Military career
- Allegiance: United Kingdom
- Branch: Royal Navy
- Service years: 1772–1830
- Rank: Vice-Admiral of the Red
- Commands: HMS Flirt; HMS Pluto; HMS Boston; HMS Lively; HMS Phaeton; Blackwater-Stour Sea Fencibles; HMS Leopard; HMS Colossus; HMS Formidable
- Conflicts: American Revolutionary War; Battle of St. Lucia; Battle of Grenada; Relief of Gibraltar; Battle of the Saintes; French Revolutionary Wars; Napoleonic Wars; Battle of Trafalgar
- Awards: Naval Gold Medal

Vice-Admiral Sir James Nicoll Morris KCB (1763 – 15 April 1830) was a Royal Navy officer who served through the American Revolutionary War, French Revolutionary Wars, and Napoleonic Wars. He joined the Royal Navy in 1772 and subsequently fought as a junior officer in the Leeward Islands in the battles of St Lucia, Grenada, and the Saintes. He was promoted to commander in 1790, going to the Leeward Islands where he commanded HMS Flirt, and then he similarly had HMS Pluto on the Newfoundland Station. Morris was promoted to post-captain in 1793 and given command of HMS Boston, in which he became a successful prizetaker around Cape Finisterre. In 1798 he transferred to command HMS Lively but in April that ship was wrecked off Cádiz. His next command was HMS Phaeton in the following year. In Phaeton Morris fought in the Mediterranean, assisting the Austrian battles against French forces in Italy.

Morris was unemployed during the Peace of Amiens but received in quick succession command of a group of Sea Fencibles, then HMS Leopard, and finally HMS Colossus in 1804. In Colossus he served in the English Channel and then off Cádiz, and in October 1805 he fought at the Battle of Trafalgar where Colossus was the most heavily engaged of the British ships, fighting three enemy ships of the line and receiving around 200 casualties. Morris himself was injured in the battle but after recovering he continued to serve in Colossus until 1808. He then commanded HMS Formidable in the Baltic Fleet from 1810 until he was promoted to rear-admiral in 1811. He returned to the Baltic as third-in-command of that fleet in 1812, staying there until the end of the Napoleonic Wars, which was his last service in the navy.

== Early career ==
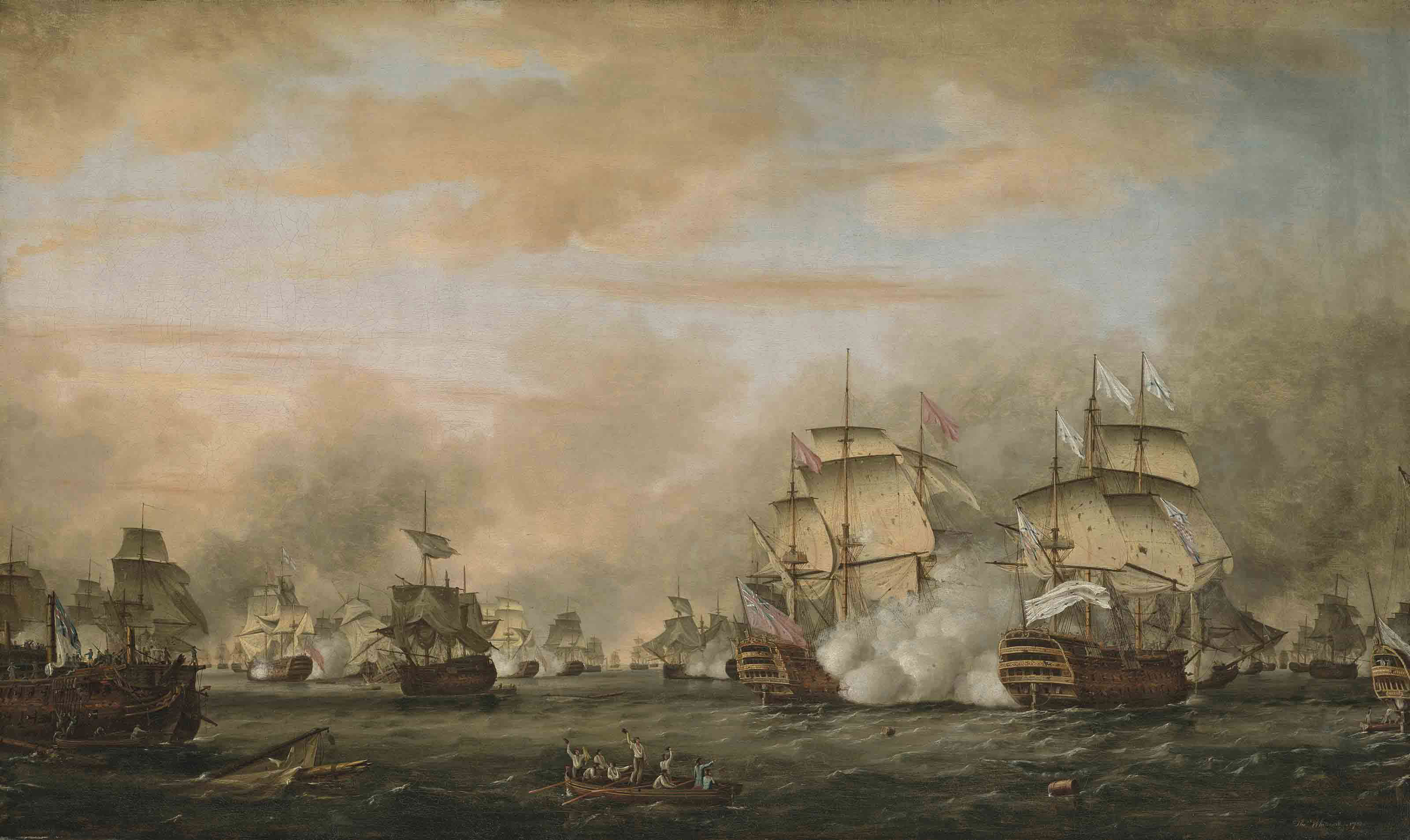
The Battle of the Saintes, at which Morris was present on HMS Namur

James Nicoll Morris was born in 1763, the son of Captain John Morris of the Royal Navy. Morris joined the Royal Navy on 19 January 1772 when he was entered in the books of the 14-gun sloop HMS Otter, commanded by his father, as a captain's servant. Morris served in Otter on the Newfoundland Station but soon after transferred into the 74-gun ship of the line HMS Resolution, which was the guardship at Portsmouth. He left Resolution on 13 July 1775 to continue his schooling. While he did so, his father was mortally wounded at the Battle of Sullivan's Island on 28 June 1776. Morris was left in his father's will as a "legacy to king and country".

Morris ended his naval hiatus on 31 March 1778 when he transferred to the 74-gun ship of the line HMS Prince of Wales, which was the flagship of Rear-Admiral Samuel Barrington on the Leeward Islands Station, as a midshipman. (Note: Doubt has been cast on whether Morris truly went to sea before this point, with the first concrete evidence of physical service only coming in 1778 on Prince of Wales. However, Peter Hore portrays Morris as being present at his father's death in his biography.) Morris then transferred to the 20-gun post ship HMS Ariadne in October, and in her fought at the Battle of St. Lucia on 15 December and Battle of Grenada on 6 July of the following year. From Ariadne he then moved to the 10-gun sloop HMS Fortune on 27 November 1779, which was fitting out in England to sail to the Leeward Islands. Morris only stayed with Fortune until she passed Cork, at which point he travelled back to Portsmouth in the 24-gun frigate HMS Amphitrite. From there Morris continued his connection with Barrington by joining his flagship in the English Channel, the 90-gun ship of the line HMS Barfleur, on 12 January 1780.

On 14 September Morris was posted to the 90-gun ship of the line HMS Queen, taking with him his promotion to lieutenant. Staying in the English Channel, he subsequently transferred into the 90-gun ship of the line HMS Namur, in which he participated in the second naval relief of Gibraltar on 12 April 1781. Namur then travelled to the Leeward Islands, where she joined the fleet of Admiral Sir George Rodney in time to fight at the Battle of the Saintes on 12 April 1782. Morris left Namur on 6 June 1783 as the American Revolutionary War began to end and went on half pay. He stayed in that situation until 23 August 1786 when he was appointed to serve on the 50-gun fourth rate HMS Leander. He subsequently served in quick succession in the 74-gun ships of the line HMS Orion and HMS Arrogant and then had a second stint in Barfleur before in 1790 he again reacquainted himself with Barrington, joining his 100-gun ship of the line flagship HMS Royal George during the Spanish Armament.

== Command ==
Barrington had Morris promoted to commander on 21 September. He was then given command of the 14-gun brig HMS Flirt in the Leeward Islands from September, officially from 2 January 1791, and he commanded her until 28 November 1792, joining his next command, the 14-gun sloop HMS Pluto, on 26 December. In Pluto he sailed to serve on the Newfoundland Station on 16 May 1793 and, the French Revolutionary War having begun, he captured the French 16-gun privateer sloop Lutine on 25 July. Morris spent little time in Pluto, because on 7 October of the same year he was promoted to post-captain in recognition of his capture of Lutine and given command of the 32-gun frigate HMS Boston. He sailed Boston home to England and after initially serving in the English Channel he sailed to the Mediterranean Sea on 22 February 1796. Morris then served off Cape Finisterre and was very successful, capturing the Spanish privateer l’Enfant de la Patria, of 16 guns, on 16 April 1797, El Principe de Paz, of 20 guns, on 4 June, St. Bernardo, of 12 guns, on 16 June, and Hazard, of 8 guns, on 30 July. In early 1798 Morris transferred commands, joining the 32-gun frigate HMS Lively.

He continued off the Spanish coast in Lively but on the night of 12 April 1798 she was shipwrecked on Rota Point, near Cádiz. Visibility at the time of the incident was very poor and Lively had accidentally gotten too close to the shore in the darkness. Boats from other British ships were sent in the morning to rescue the crew, and while one crewmember was killed by the fire of some Spanish batteries the rest were safely taken off and Lively was burned. Morris was not deemed to be at fault for the loss of his ship and was congratulated for successfully escaping the fire of the batteries. On 14 July 1799 he received as his next command, the 38-gun frigate HMS Phaeton.

In the autumn of the same year Morris conveyed in Phaeton Lord Elgin to Constantinople, where he was travelling to take up his post as ambassador. They left England on 4 September and arrived on 2 November in the Dardanelles, from where they sailed to the city. After this Phaeton stayed in the Mediterranean with the Mediterranean Fleet, by May 1800 being stationed off Genoa. At the time the French and Austrian armies were engaging each other in Genoa, and Morris in Phaeton was detached to assist the forces of Peter Karl Ott von Bátorkéz. As such, Phaeton was present off the coast when the French retreated from Alassio in May, and was able to fire on them. Subsequently, Morris captured twenty ships carrying corn for the French army as well as a stockpile of arms, and continued to harry the French army as they retreated down the coast. By October Morris had completed this duty, and he was serving off Málaga; on 28 October the boats of Phaeton successfully cut out the Spanish 14-gun polacca San Josef from under the guns of an enemy battery. In 1801 Phaeton moved from the centre of the Mediterranean to continue serving off the coast of Spain and on 16 May Morris sent his ship's boats, in tandem with those of the 32-gun frigate HMS Naiad, in to Marín where they captured the Spanish armed packet L'Alcudia and destroyed her compatriot El Raposo. Morris continued serving off Spain until the end of the year when he was sent home to England with dispatches from Admiral Lord Keith. He arrived at Portsmouth on 27 February 1802 and paid off Phaeton.

== Trafalgar ==
Morris stayed on half pay throughout the Peace of Amiens but upon the start of the Napoleonic Wars in 1803 he was given command of the Sea Fencibles located between Blackwater and the River Stour on 12 July. On 10 October of the same year he was given command of the 50-gun fourth rate HMS Leopard as flagship to Commodore Charles Cunningham. Morris stayed in Leopard only until 11 May 1804 because he was then given command of the 74-gun ship of the line HMS Colossus. When Morris first joined Colossus, a brand new ship, her crew was sickly and "unpromising", but he worked to improve the ship while serving in the fleet of Admiral William Cornwallis off Brest, and the ship would go on to be described as an "excellent sailer" there. He and Colossus served off Brest until October 1805 when they were sent to join the fleet of Vice-Admiral Lord Nelson off Cádiz. As part of such on 21 October Morris fought in the Battle of Trafalgar.

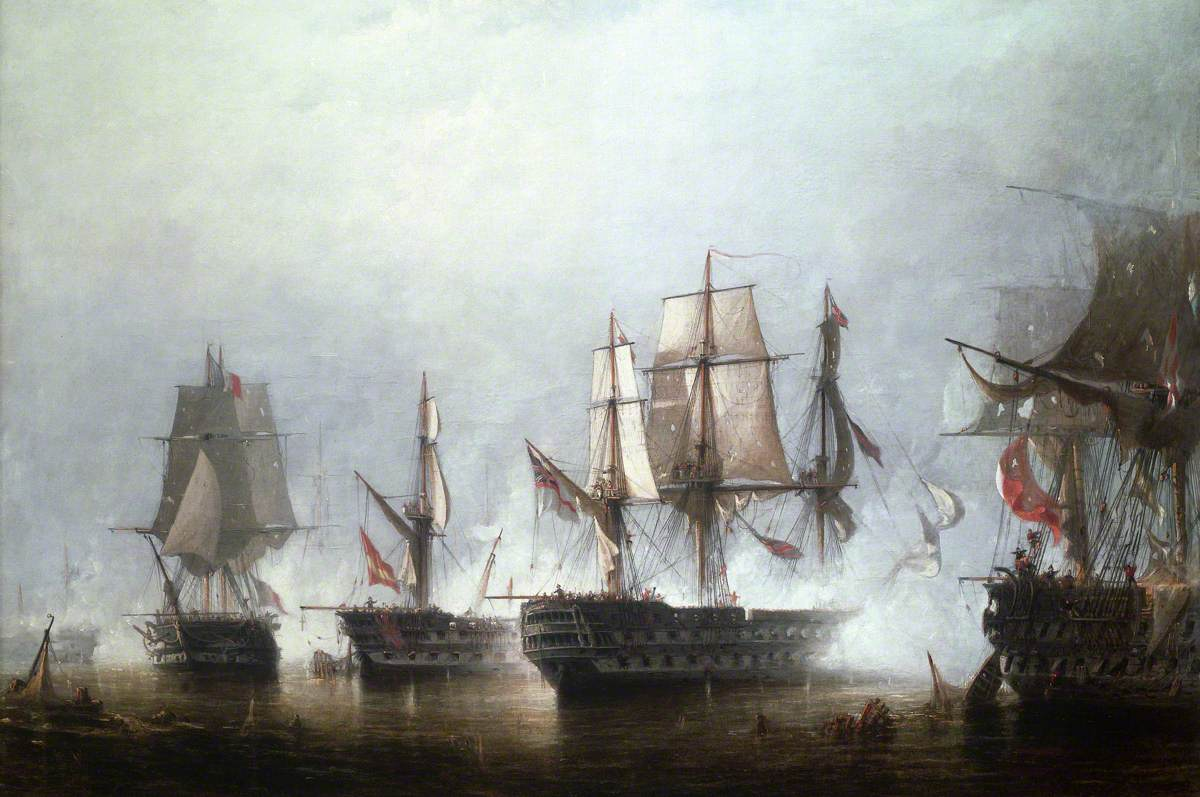
Colossus, second right, at Trafalgar. She is firing into Argonaute, far right, while to her left are Bahama and Swiftsure

In the battle Colossus was the sixth ship in the leeward column, led by Vice-Admiral Cuthbert Collingwood. As he reached the enemy line, Morris had Colossus fire her starboard guns in order to create a smoke screen to assist their advance. In the fighting that came after the two columns of Nelson's fleet had pierced the Franco-Spanish line of battle Colossus received the most damage and casualties out of any British ship in the battle with 40 men killed and 160 wounded. Colossus initially engaged the French 74-gun ship of the line Swiftsure to her larboard side and her first broadside killed seventeen of Swiftsure's crew, but she was then also attacked by the 74-gun ship of the line Argonaute, which smashed into Colossus's starboard side. It was while she was sandwiched between these two ships that Colossus took most of her punishment, fighting both ships for half an hour until Argonaute shied away after receiving over 200 casualties in the engagement. (Note: There is debate as to whether Colossus or Argonaute was the ship to initiate the movement that separated the two, but it is equally likely that a shift in the sea forced the two apart without their assistance.) At one point Colossus was almost overwhelmed by a boarding party, but she was saved when her crew on the lower decks climbed up and fought off the attackers. After Argonaute had moved away Morris continued to engage Swiftsure until that vessel lost two of her masts and was described as nothing more than a hulk. Colossus afterwards moved on to attack the Spanish 74-gun ship of the line Bahama, which had been firing on Colossus from a distance, and Morris succeeded in destroying her mizzenmast before obtaining her surrender, Bahama being in a hopeless situation surrounded by four ships of the line.

Having finished with Bahama, Morris quickly began to manoeuvre his ship as Swiftsure had regained control of herself and was attempting to rake his stern. The ship was finally relieved in battle by Orion which sailed up behind Swiftsure and fired three broadsides into her, forcing the French ship to finally surrender. Morris then began to turn Colossus into the wind to continue in the fighting, but as he did so her mizzenmast fell over the starboard side, signifying the end of Colossus's contributions to the battle. Morris himself had become a casualty during the fighting, receiving a severe wound to his thigh or knee, but he stayed on deck after applying his own tourniquet until the combat had finished, at which point he fainted from a lack of blood and was carried below. Colossus was then taken in tow by the 64-gun ship of the line HMS Agamemnon, her mainmast having been cut away on the afternoon of 23 October and Morris in fear that she would succumb to her many injuries and founder. The ship survived the storm of the following night and sailed to Gibraltar with Agamemnon and the 74-gun ship of the line HMS Bellerophon on 27 October. There Morris recovered from his injury.

== Later service ==
Morris, along with the other captains present at Trafalgar, was awarded a Naval Gold Medal for his service and received the thanks of the Houses of Parliament. He was also presented with a vase by Lloyd's Patriotic Fund. He continued in command of Colossus after the battle; she was paid off on 29 December but Morris recommissioned her on 5 July 1806, from when he served off Rochefort in the squadron of Rear-Admiral Sir Richard Strachan. Having chased a French squadron there, from 30 June 1808 Morris served in the Mediterranean. He left the ship on 9 August of that year, suffering from a rupture. His next command came on 1 April 1810 when he joined the 98-gun ship of the line HMS Formidable in the Baltic Fleet, and on 31 July of that year he was further rewarded for his services when he was made a Colonel of Marines. On 1 August 1811 Morris was promoted to rear-admiral, leaving Formidable. Upon the request of Vice-Admiral Sir James Saumarez who commanded the fleet, he re-joined the Baltic Fleet in 1812 as third-in-command with the 74-gun ship of the line HMS Vigo as his flagship.

Morris spent his time in the Baltic escorting convoys and protecting against Danish attacks around the Great Belt and thus was not part of the force that fought at the Siege of Riga towards the end of the year. He did not receive any more postings after the end of the Napoleonic Wars in 1815, but in reward for his services was appointed a Knight Commander of the Order of the Bath on 2 January. Through seniority he continued to be promoted after this, becoming a vice-admiral on 12 August 1819. (Note: Full dates of promotion: rear-admiral of the blue 1 August 1811, rear-admiral of the white 12 August 1812, rear-admiral of the red 4 June 1814, vice-admiral of the blue 12 August 1819, vice-admiral of the white 19 July 1821, vice-admiral of the red 27 May 1825.) Morris died at his home at Marlow, Buckinghamshire, on 15 April 1830, aged sixty-six, and is buried there.

== Family ==
Morris married Margaretta Sarah Somers Cocks (died January 1842), the daughter of the banker Thomas Somers Cocks and niece of Charles Cocks, 1st Baron Somers, on 25 October 1802. Through this marriage he became brother-in-law to Admiral Sir William Hargood.
