= Alexander Robert Kerr =

Captain Alexander Robert Kerr CB
- Born: 1770
- Died: 4 August 1831 (aged 60–61); Stonehouse, Plymouth
- Military career
- Allegiance: United Kingdom
- Branch: Royal Navy
- Service years: 1781–1831
- Conflicts: French Revolutionary Wars; Action of 31 July 1793; Action of 20 August 1799; Napoleonic Wars; Battle of Basque Roads
- Awards: Companion of the Order of the Bath

Captain Alexander Robert Kerr (1770 – 4 August 1831) was a Royal Navy officer of the late eighteenth and early nineteenth century who is best known for his service as captain of the ship of the line HMS Revenge at the Battle of Basque Roads in 1809 and his subsequent involvement in the court-martial of Admiral Lord Gambier which followed. He had earlier in his career fought and been badly wounded at the action of 31 July 1793 off the coast of New Jersey.

== Life ==
Kerr was born in 1770, the son of Robert Kerr, a Royal Navy lieutenant. In 1781 was joined the navy himself as midshipman on board the frigate HMS Endymion, commanded by Captain James Gambier and from there served in a number of other vessels, including a period on HMS Boreas under Captain Horatio Nelson. In 1790 he was promoted to lieutenant and joined first HMS Narcissus and then the frigate HMS Boston under Captain George Courtenay.

Boston was assigned to the American Station at the outbreak of the French Revolutionary Wars and on 31 July 1793 challenged the French frigate Embuscade, then anchored in New York City to combat. Captain Jean-Baptiste-François Bompart obliged, and the frigates battled for several hours off the coast of Navesink, New Jersey. In the engagement Boston took severe damage and Courtenay was killed. Kerr himself was badly wounded, struck in the shoulder by grape-shot and blinded in one eye by flying splinters. The surviving British officers managed to extract Boston from the action before the damage became fatal, and later withdrew to St John's, Newfoundland.

After his recovery, Kerr served in HMS Repulse and HMS Clyde, fighting in the latter at the action of 20 August 1799, for which he was commended by Captain Charles Cunningham. In 1802 at the start of the Napoleonic Wars he was promoted to commander and served in HMS Diligence and HMS Combatant at the blockade of Boulogne. In 1806 he was promoted to captain and from 1808 took a series of temporary commissions as commander of the ships of the line HMS Tigre, HMS Valiant and HMS Revenge in the Channel Fleet, then commanded by his old captain, now Lord Gambier.

In April 1809, Revenge was heavily engaged at the Battle of Basque Roads, in which a French fleet was driven ashore at the mouth of the Charente and partially destroyed. The engagement was particularly notable for a bitter dispute which subsequently arose between Gambier and the commander of the inshore squadron, Captain Lord Cochrane, after the latter publicly accused the former of incompetence in his conduct during the battle. Kerr was called as a witness for the defence during Gambier's ensuing court-martial, at which the admiral was acquitted.

Kerr then took command of HMS Ganymede, HMS Unicorn and then HMS Esperance, engaged in anti-privateer patrols and convoying of East India cargo. In 1811 he assumed command of his last ship, HMS Acasta, operating against American privateers in the War of 1812 until the peace in 1815, when he retired from active service. He was initiated as a Companion of the Order of the Bath in appreciation for his service, and died at Stonehouse, Plymouth in 1831, survived by his wife Charlotte and seven children.
