= HMS Colossus (1803) =

1803 ship of the line of the Royal Navy

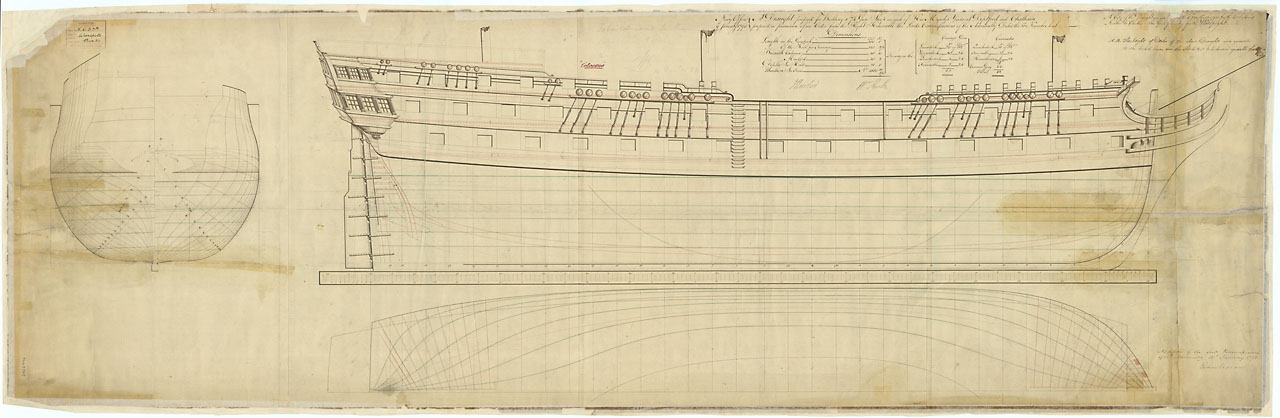
- Hull plan for Colossus and Warspite

History

United Kingdom
- Name: Colossus
- Ordered: 23 November 1797
- Builder: Deptford Dockyard
- Laid down: May 1799
- Launched: 23 April 1803
- Commissioned: March 1803
- Fate: Broken up, 8 February 1826

General characteristics
- Class & type: Colossus-class ship of the line
- Tons burthen: 1,888 47/94 (bm)
- Length: 181 ft 1 in (55.2 m) (gundeck)
- Beam: 48 ft 11 in (14.9 m)
- Draught: 18 ft (5.5 m) (light)
- Depth of hold: 21 ft (6.4 m)
- Sail plan: Full-rigged ship
- Complement: 590
- Armament: 74 muzzle-loading, smoothbore guns; Gundeck: 28 × 32 pdr guns; Upper deck: 30 × 24 pdr guns; Quarterdeck: 4 × 24 pdr guns + 10 × 32 pdr carronades; Forecastle: 2 × 24 pdr guns + 2 × 24 pdr carronades; Poop: 6 × 18 pdr carronades

HMS Colossus was the lead ship of her class of 74-gun, third-rate ships of the line built for the Royal Navy in the first decade of the 19th century. Completed in 1803, she played a minor role in the Napoleonic Wars, including participating in the Battle of Trafalgar two years later. She was broken up in 1826.

== Description ==
The Colossus-class ship of the line was designed by Sir John Henslow, co-Surveyor of the Navy. It was one of the "large" type of 74 with heavier guns than those of the "common" and "middling" classes. Colossus measured 181 feet 1 inch (55.2 m) on the gundeck and 148 feet 4 inches (45.2 m) on the keel. She had a beam of 48 feet 11 inches (14.9 m), a depth of hold of 21 feet (6.4 m) and had a tonnage of 1,888 47/94 tons burthen. The ship's draught was 13 feet 3 inches (4 m) forward and 18 feet (5.5 m) aft at light load; fully loaded, her draught would be significantly deeper. The ships' crew numbered 590 officers and ratings. They were fitted with three masts and were ship-rigged.

The ships were armed with 74 muzzle-loading, smoothbore guns that consisted of twenty-eight 32-pounder guns on their lower gundeck and thirty 24-pounder guns on their upper deck. Their forecastle mounted a pair of 24-pounder guns and two 24-pounder carronades. On their quarterdeck they carried four 24-pounders and ten 32-pounder carronades. Six 18-pounder carronades were positioned on the poop deck. Sometime before 1815, Colossus had her 24-pounders on the upper deck replaced by 18-pounder guns.

== Construction and career ==
Colossus was the second ship of her name to serve in the Royal Navy. She was ordered on 23 November 1797 and was laid down at Deptford Dockyard in May 1799. The ship was launched on 23 April 1803 and was commissioned by Captain George Martin in March. Colossus was completed at Woolwich Dockyard on 20 June and assigned to the Mediterranean Fleet.

The ship joined a squadron of the Channel Fleet commanded by Captain Sir Edward Pellew blockading Ferrol and A Coruña, Spain, on 19 August. Colossus recaptured the East Indiaman Lord Nelson on 27 August, which the French privateer Belone had captured two weeks before and which the brig-sloop Seagull had fought to the point of surrender. The ship served from December to February 1804 as the flagship of Rear-Admiral Cuthbert Collingwood, commander of the Inshore Squadron blockading the French coast. In May, Colossus was briefly the flagship of Rear-Admiral Sir Thomas Graves, the new commander of the Inshore Squadron.

Captain James Nicoll Morris assumed command on 23 June. Shortly afterwards, the ship joined Vice-Admiral Collingwood's small squadron blockading Cádiz, Spain. On 20 August, the Franco-Spanish fleet spotted Collingwood's four ships of the line and single frigate while sailing from Ferrol and A Coruña to Cádiz. Vice-Admiral Pierre-Charles Villeneuve, commander of the combined fleet, detached sixteen ships of the line in pursuit, two hours after Collingwood had slowly sailed towards the Strait of Gibraltar. Once he reached the entrance to the Strait, he ordered his ships to turn about, streamed signal flags as if to a friendly fleet in the strait and ordered Colossus to close with the advancing Franco-Spanish ships, to give the appearance of reconnoitering in anticipation of a battle. The allied fleet turned away and entered Cádiz harbour.

=== Battle of Trafalgar ===
Artist's conception of the situation at noon as Royal Sovereign was breaking into the Franco-Spanish line. The depiction of Nelson's northern column is incorrect as he aimed much closer to the leading ships, before turning south and paralleling the Franco-Spanish line before turning east towards the French flagship, the 86-gun Bucentaure.

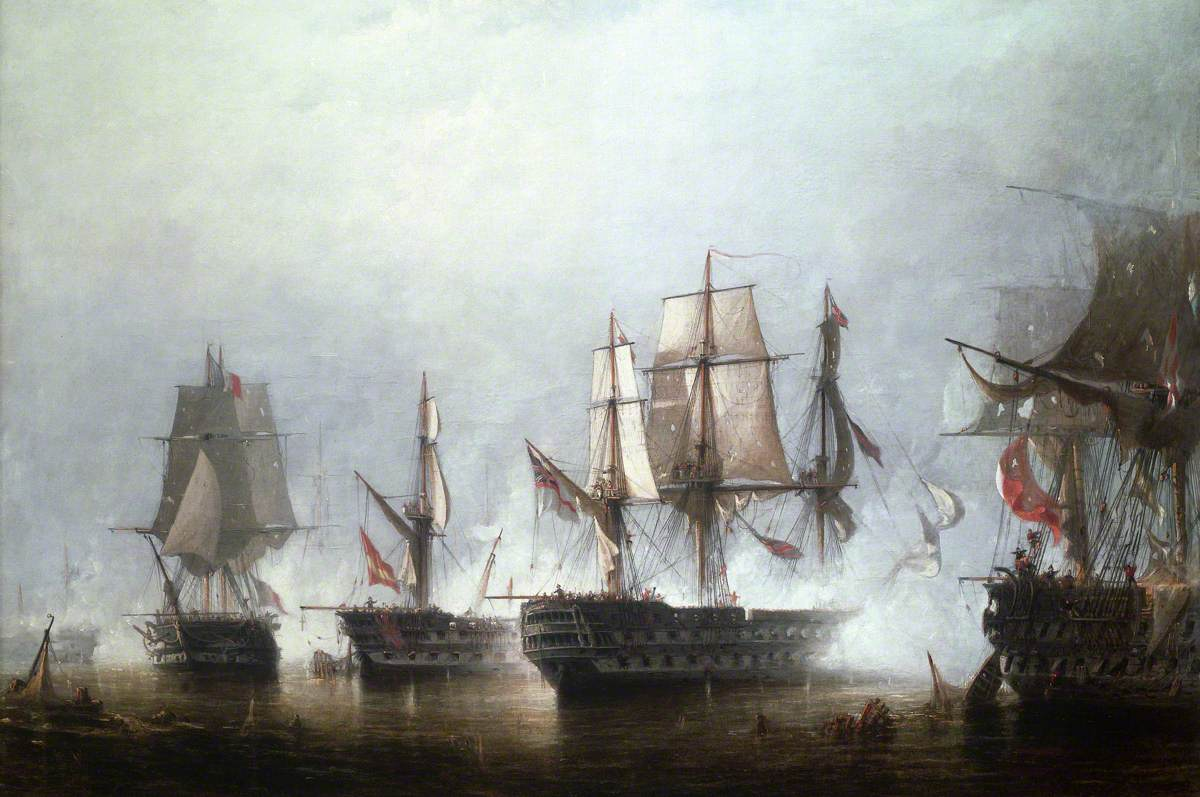
The Battle of Trafalgar, 21 October. On the left the French Swiftsure, next to her the Spanish Bahama, then the Colossus firing into the French Argonaute. Painting by Richard Henry Nibbs

In the days before the battle, Colossus was part of the chain of ships relaying signals to Vice-Admiral Lord Horatio Nelson, commander of the British fleet, from the frigates closest to Cádiz. Disregarding the traditional tactic of sailing in parallel lines, Nelson decided that he would form his ships into two columns in line ahead that would break through the enemy's line and allow his ships to defeat them in detail because the foremost ships would require a significant amount of time to turn around so they could engage his ships. The leading ships in each column would have to bear the brunt of the enemy's fire until the breakthrough so Nelson decided his largest and most durable ships would lead the columns. He chose to lead the windward (northern) column in his flagship, HMS Victory, and Collingwood would lead the leeward (southern) column in his flagship, Royal Sovereign. Colossus was the sixth ship in line behind the latter ship.

The ship closed to within firing range of the combined fleet about 1300, an hour after Royal Sovereign had broken the Franco-Spanish battle line. Colossus's opening salvo from her port double-shotted guns struck Swiftsure, 74, and killed 17 men aboard the French ship. Colossus continued to engage Swiftsure even after the French 74-gun Argonaute collided with the British ship's starboard side in the smoke, entangling their yardarms. Argonaute initially fired a double-shotted broadside into Colossus and they continued to exchange fire at point-blank range. The British ship's carronades swept the Argonaute's upper deck clear of her crew who withdrew below decks, preparing to board the British ship. After about a half hour of action, the ships drifted apart before the French could make their attempt. Morris claimed that Argonaute was reduced to firing only a single gun from her stern cabin as they separated.

While Colossus was firing at Argonaute, she was engaging both Swiftsure and the Spanish Bahama, 74, on her other side, concentrating her fire on the latter. After about two hours, Colossus had temporarily silenced most of Swiftsure's guns and knocked down her main topmast, which caused her to drift astern. The British ship had caused Bahama's mizzen and mainmast, killed her captain, Brigadier Dionisio Alcalá Galiano. The sailcloth and rigging from the masts had fallen over many of the ship's guns which prevented them from firing and a council of the surviving ship's officers decided to surrender.

After Bahama had surrendered, Swiftsure's crew had managed to get her under control and attempted to rake Colossus's stern, but Morris had already begun his turn, swinging his stern away from the French ship, and fired a broadside that brought her mizzenmast down. The British 74 Orion then appeared out of the smoke and delivered three broadsides that knocked down Swiftsure's mainmast, the ship's wheel and dismounted most of the guns on the upper deck. The ship surrendered shortly afterwards. Colossus was in bad shape after these engagements, her mizzenmast had been lost late in her duel with Swiftsure and her rigging and remaining masts had been badly damaged. Her crew sustained the most casualties of any British ship in the battle, with 40 killed and 160 wounded, including Morris who was hit by a grazing shot outside his knee from one of Argonaute's guns. He refused medical treatment and used a tourniquet to stop the bleeding. The ship had to be towed after the battle by the 64-gun Agamemnon.

== War of 1812 ==
On 24 March 1812 Colossus in company with Tonnant, Hogue, Poictiers and Bulwark captured the Emilie.

On 5 January 1813 Colossus, the frigate Rhin and the brig Goldfinch captured the American ship Dolphin. A little over a month later, on 11 February, Rhin and Colossus captured the American ship Print.

== Fate ==
In 1815 Colossus was placed in ordinary at Chatham. She was broken up on 8 February 1826.
