= Pierre Jean Van Stabel =

French Navy officer

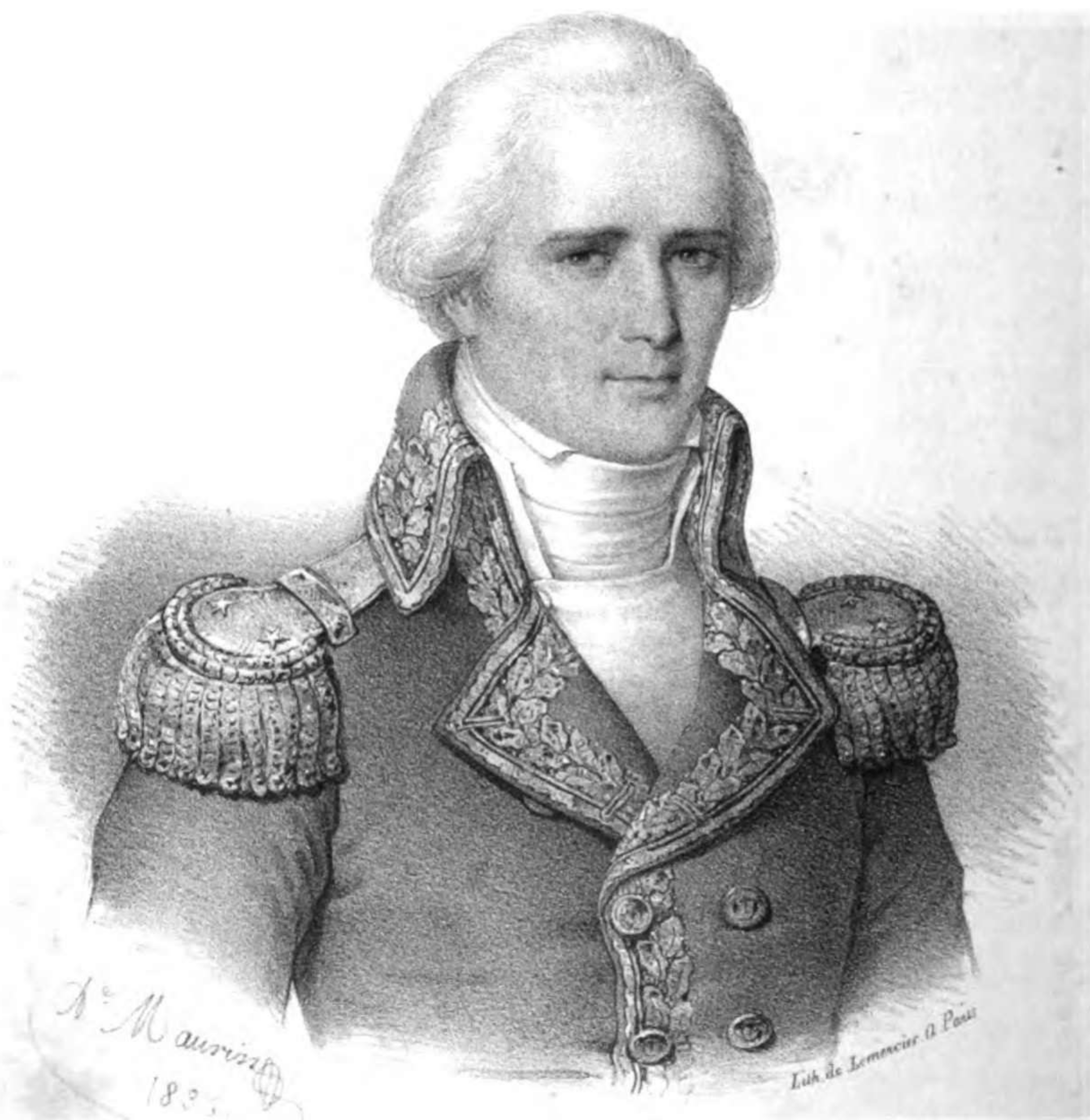
- 1835 portrait of Van Stabel by Antoine Maurin
- Born: 8 November 1744; Dunkirk, France
- Died: 30 March 1797 (aged 52); Dunkirk, France
- Military career
- Allegiance: Kingdom of France; French First Republic
- Branch: French Navy
- Service years: 1778–1797
- Rank: Counter admiral
- Conflicts: American Revolutionary War; French Revolutionary Wars; Atlantic campaign of May 1794
- Awards: Silver sword offered by Louis XVI; Declared to have Bien mérité de la Patrie by the National Convention

Counter-Admiral Pierre Jean Van Stabel (Note: Sometimes written "Vanstabel") (8 November 1744 – 30 March 1797) was a French Navy officer who served in the American Revolutionary War and French Revolutionary Wars.

== Career ==
Pierre Jean Van Stabel was born to a family of sailors and started a career in the merchant navy at the age of fourteen, steadily rosing to the rank of sea captain. In 1778, with the intervention of France in the American Revolutionary War, Van Stabel enlisted in the French Royal Navy as an auxiliary officer.

=== Service on Rohan Soubise ===
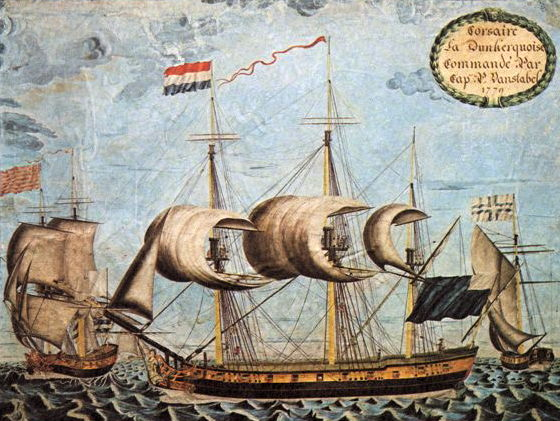
Van Stabel's privateer Dunkerquoise in 1779.

Van Stabel took command of the privateer Dunkerquoise In 1781, he was in command of the 22-gun corvette Rohan Soubise, formerly the privateer Comtesse d'Artois purchased into service on 27 April 1781.

Commanding Rohan Soubise, Van Stabel captured the 16-gun British privateer Admiral Rodney after a one-hour battle, in which he was twice wounded by musket bullets to the throat, relinquishing command of his ship just long enough to have the bullets removed from him body. Too damaged in the battle to be taken as a prize, the privateer was then scuttled by being burnt. King Louis XVI had a silver sword presented to him in recognition. Van Stabel later commanded another privateer, the Robecq.

=== Service as captain the Channel ===
In 1782, Van Stabel was promoted to frigate lieutenant, and tasked with escort duty in the English Channel, on various small warships. In 1787, Van Stabel was tasked with ferrying four large barges from Boulogne to Brest. In 1788, he conducted a hydrographic survey of the coasts of the English Channel; he was given command of the lugger Fanfaron. Promoted to ship-of-the-line ensign in 1792, he took command of the frigate Proserpine, on which he left a one-year cruise in the Caribbean part of which was spent in Saint-Domingue. In February 1793, with the expansion of the War of the First Coalition, Van Stabel was promoted to frigate captain, and appointed to command the frigate Thétis. He departed Brest in April and led a four-month cruise in the English Channel, capturing around 40 British merchantmen.

=== Service as counter-admiral the Channel ===
In November of the same year, Van Stabel was promoted to counter admiral, and took command of a division comprising six ships of the line, with his flag on the 74-gun Tigre; the other ships were Jean Bart, Tourville, Impétueux, Aquilon and Révolution, with a screening force comprising the frigates Insurgente and Sémillante, and the brigs Ballon and Espiègle.

On 16 November, the division departed Brest to intercept a British convoy in the Channel. Instead of the convoy and its expected four-ship escort (Note: Troude (p.291) states that the French expected five ships of the line) under Admiral Sir John Jervis, Van Stabel's division met a 28-ship squadron under Admiral Richard Howe. Van Stabel ordered a retreat, but Sémillante's inferior nautical qualities made her lag behind the rest of the French division, and she was soon overhauled by a British frigate. Van Stabel sailed Tigre independently to rescue her, and in the course of a chase that lasted several days, managed to capture 17 merchantmen from the convoy Jervis' squadron was escorting without granting Howe a head-on engagement before returning to Brest. However, Espiègle was captured by two British frigates on 29 November.

=== Atlantic campaign of May 1794 ===
Later than year, Van Stabel, with his flag captain Captain Maxime Julien Émeriau de Beauverger, was tasked with escorting a grain convoy onboard the frigate Embuscade, from the Chesapeake Bay to France. The 170-ship convoy departed in April. The pursuit of the convoy by the Royal Navy was the focus of the Atlantic campaign of May 1794 which culminated in the Glorious First of June. The convoy arrived at the scene of the battle on 3 June and found the debris left by the battle; Van Stabel considered whether to keep his route for fear that the British navy might ambush him, but decided that the quantity of wreckage was a sign that both fleets had had to return to harbour. He continued on, and eventually reached Brest unharmed on 13 June, without losing a single ship, and having augmented his convoy with 40 prizes. The National Convention voted a decree that Van Stabel had earned the Bien mérité de la Patrie.

=== Later service and death ===
During the Croisière du Grand Hiver, Van Stabel commanded the light squadron of Louis Thomas Villaret de Joyeuse's fleet, and lost none of his ships despite the campaign's disastrous failure. In 1796, the French Directory decided to reopen the shipping lines on the Scheldt, and tasked Van Stabel to lead two brigs and four gunboats to escort eight merchantmen to Antwerp (six French and two Swedish). Van Stabel managed to sail by several Dutch forts without engaging them. Van Stabel then returned to Vlissingen to conduct patrols in the North Sea at the head of a division comprising four frigates and a number of corvettes. However, his declining health forced him to return to Dunkirk, where he died soon after of a chest disease.

== Notes and references ==
=== Bibliography ===
- Bordonove, Georges (1974). Les marins de l'an II. Paris: Robert Laffont.
- Gardiner, Robert (2001) [1996]. "The Glorious First of June". Fleet Battle and Blockade. Caxton Editions. ISBN 1-84067-363-X.
- Hennequin, Joseph François Gabriel (1835). Biographie maritime ou notices historiques sur la vie et les campagnes des marins célèbres français et étrangers (in French). Vol. 2. Paris: Regnault éditeur.
- Levot, Prosper (1866). Les gloires maritimes de la France: notices biographiques sur les plus célèbres marins (in French). Bertrand.
- Roche, Jean-Michel (2005). Dictionnaire des bâtiments de la flotte de guerre française de Colbert à nos jours. Vol. 1. Group Retozel-Maury Millau. ISBN 978-2-9525917-0-6. OCLC 165892922.
- Six, Georges (1934). "Vanstabel (Pierre-Jean)". Dictionnaire biographique des généraux et amiraux français de la Révolution et de l'Empire: 1792–1814 (in French). Vol. 2. Paris: Librairie Historique et Nobilaire. p. 532.

=== External links ===
- Amiral Pierre VANSTABEL, la Préparation Militaire Marine de Dunkerque par Jean BOUGER
