= Spanish ship Bahama =

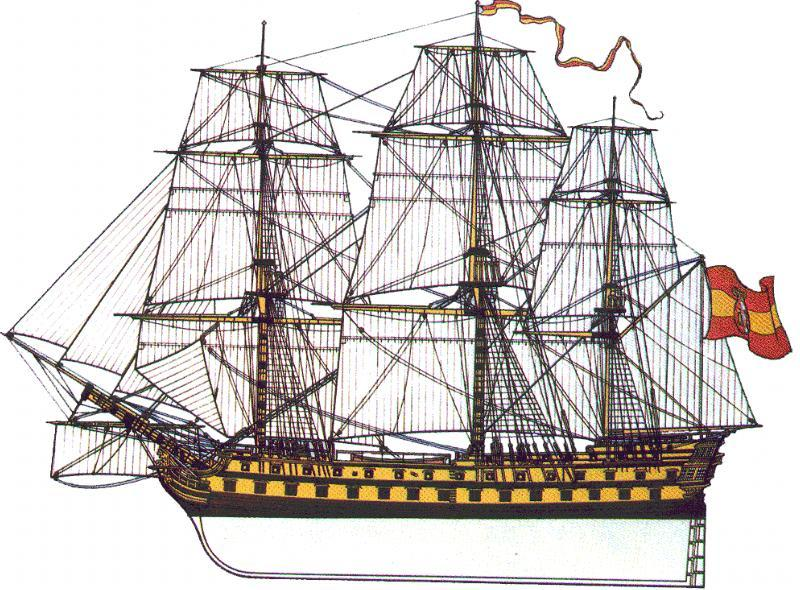
- Bahama, a drawing by Rafael Berenguer, Madrid naval museum

History

Spain
- Name: Bahama
- Ordered: 1776
- Builder: Havana
- Commissioned: 1780
- Fate: Captured at the Battle of Trafalgar, October 1805

General characteristics
- Tons burthen: 1,696 tons burthen
- Length: 50.79 m (166 ft 8 in)
- Beam: 13.63 m (44 ft 9 in)
- Draught: 5.96 m (19 ft 7 in)
- Complement: 689 men
- Armament: As a 74-gun; 28 × 24-pounder long guns; 30 × 18-pounder long guns; 10 × 8-pounder long guns; 6 × 30-pounders howitzers, 4 × 24-pounders, and 6 × 4-pounders

Bahama was a 74-gun ship of the line of the Spanish Navy. She was built in Havana on plans originally drawn by Ignacio Mullan for the 64-gun San Pedro de Alcantara, completed as a project of Gautier. She was later rebuilt as a 74-gun.

== Career ==
In 1784, Bahama was under Captain Félix del Corral y Jaime, with Commander Francisco de la Bodega y Cuadra as first officer. She departed Havana on 5 January 1785 in the fleet under Admiral Francisco de Borja, bound for Cadiz, where she arrived on 2 March.

On 3 June 1788, she entered drydock number 3 of Carraca arsenal for a refit and rebuilt as a 74-gun.

=== Battle of Trafalgar ===
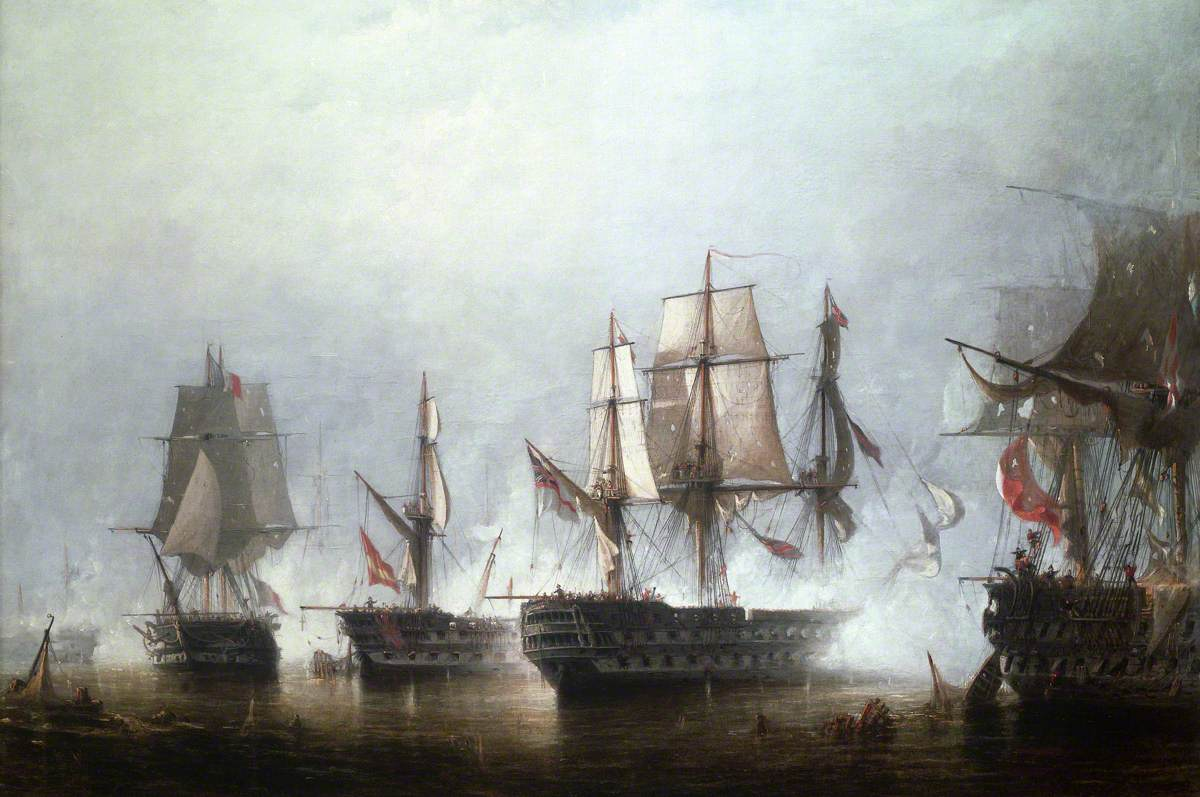
The Battle of Trafalgar, 21 October. On the left the French Swiftsure, next to her the Bahama, then HMS Colossus firing into the French Argonaute. Painting by Richard Henry Nibbs

Bahama took part in the Battle of Trafalgar on 21 October 1805, under Commodore Dionisio Alcalá Galiano. She was part of the vanguard of the Franco-Spanish fleet, at the 6th position in the second division of the reconnaissance squadron under Admiral Gravina, and came under intense fire from British ships. Bahama suffered 75 killed and 65 wounded, among whom Galiano, who died from his wounds after a cannonball struck him.

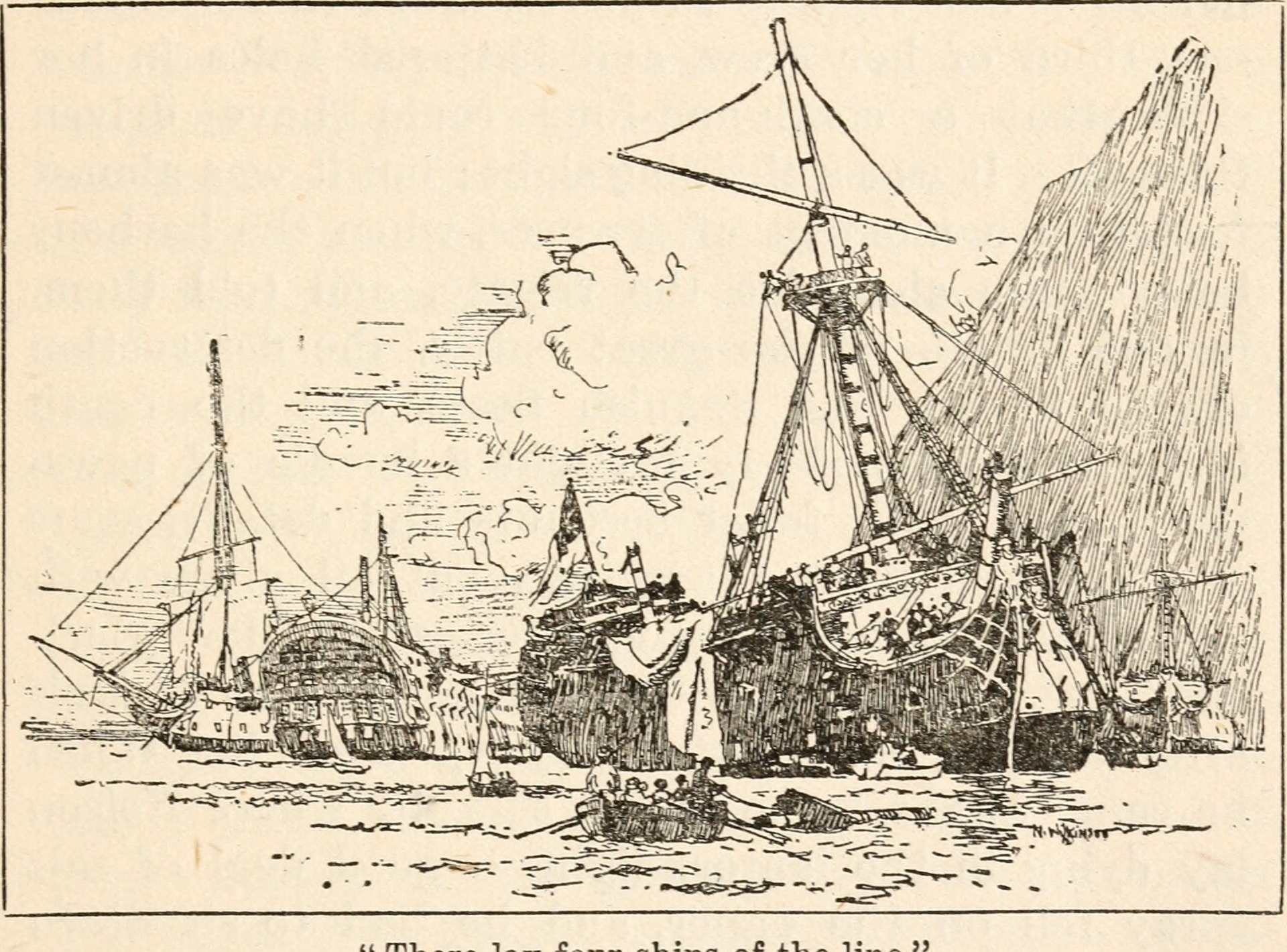
French and Spanish ships laid up at Gibraltar shortly after the battle of Trafalgar; Bahama, French Swiftsure, San Juan Nepomuceno and San Ildefonso

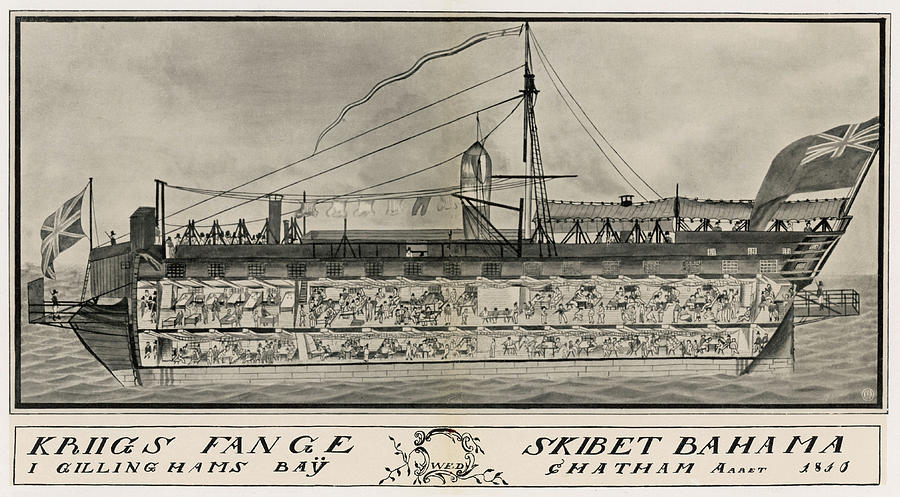
Prison hulk Bahama,, housing Danish prisoners of war, 1810

The British captured Bahama and sailed her to Gibraltar for repairs. She then sailed to England, where she was hulked and used as a prison ship. She was paid off on 15 October 1814; her demolition was completed at Chatham Dockyard in December of that year.

== Bibliography ==
- Pérez-Reverte, Arturo (2004). Cabo Trafalgar. Alfaguara. ISBN 9789870400189.
- Winfield, Rif; Tredrea, John M; García-Torralba Pérez, Enrique & Blasco Felip, Manuel (2023). Spanish Warships in the Age of Sail 1700—1860: Design, Construction, Careers and Fates. Seaforth Publishing. ISBN 978-1-5267-9078-1.
