= Bien mérité de la Patrie =

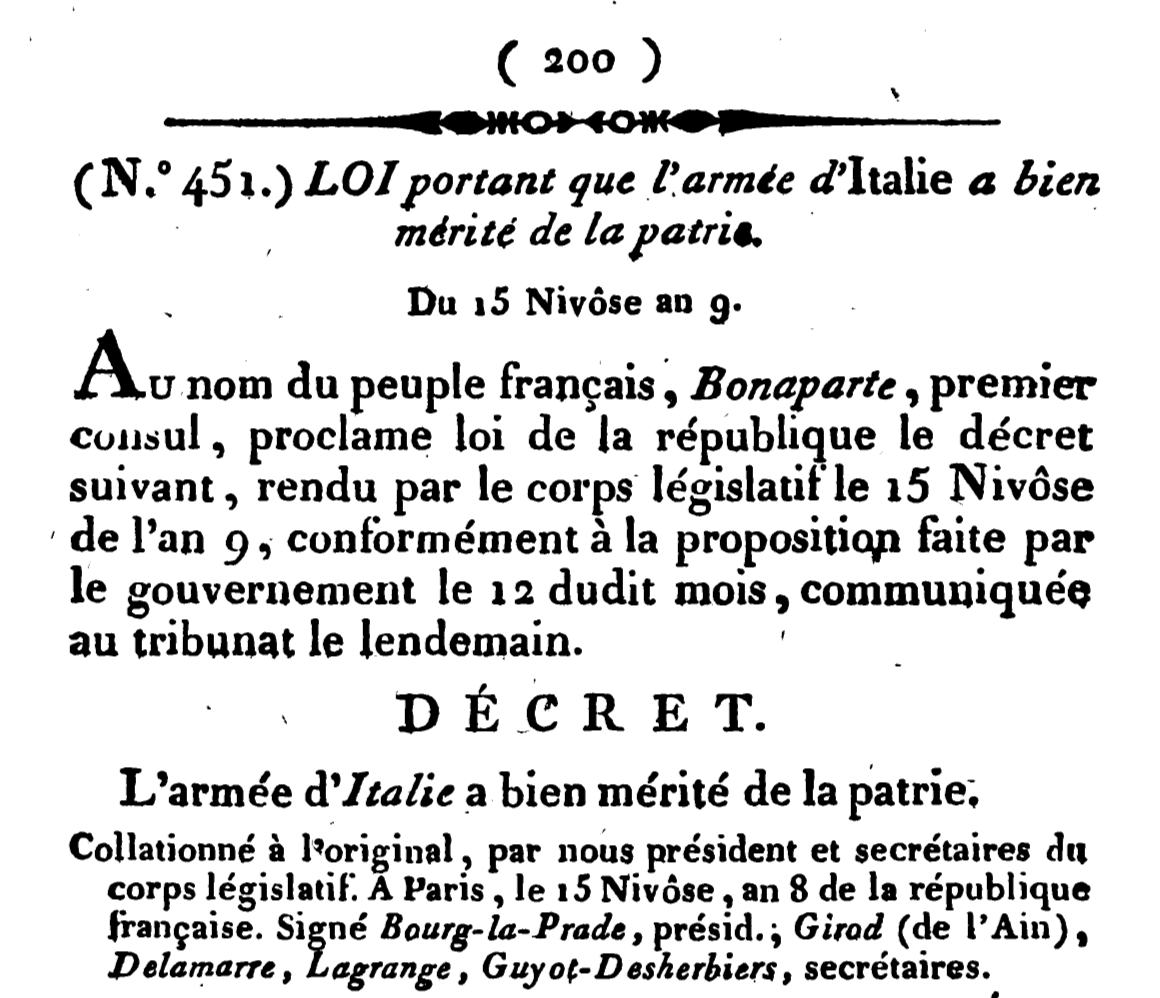
Law stating that the Army of Italy has bien mérité de la Patrie. Nivôse an IX.

Bien mérité de la Patrie (French: "Well deserved recognition of the Fatherland") is a French expression that qualifies national heroes. During the French Revolution, the phrase became a formula discerned as an award by the National Convention to deserving citizens.

== History ==
During the Ancien Régime, the Monarchy bestowed awards to deserving subjects in the form of noble titles, precious swords personally awarded by the King, or membership in chivalric orders; in particular, the Royal and Military Order of Saint Louis could be bestowed upon non-nobles. During the French Revolution, after the advent of the French First Republic, these customs fell in disfavour due to their monarchic connotations, and the anti-egalitarian sentiment of having special titles of nobility or awards that were only available for nobles. Thus, for instance, when Captain Jean-Baptiste-François Bompart was awarded a gold medal by the population of New York to commemorate the action of 31 July 1793, he accepted on the condition that he would not have to wear it.

To fill the requirement with an equalitarian national award, the National Convention developed the practice of passing resolutions by vote, solemnly stating that a deserving citizen, or group of citizen, had Bien mérité de la Patrie. These resolutions were published in Le Moniteur Universel, in a manner similar to being mentioned in dispatches.

The practice was pursued under the French Consulate, which furthermore instituted the award of Weapons of Honour for the military, and scarfs of honour to civilians. These were replaced by the Legion of Honour, founded by Bonaparte on 9 May 1802, morphing the award back into an order of chivalry (however, the Legion was awarded without reference to the distinction between noble and non-noble).

== Later use ==
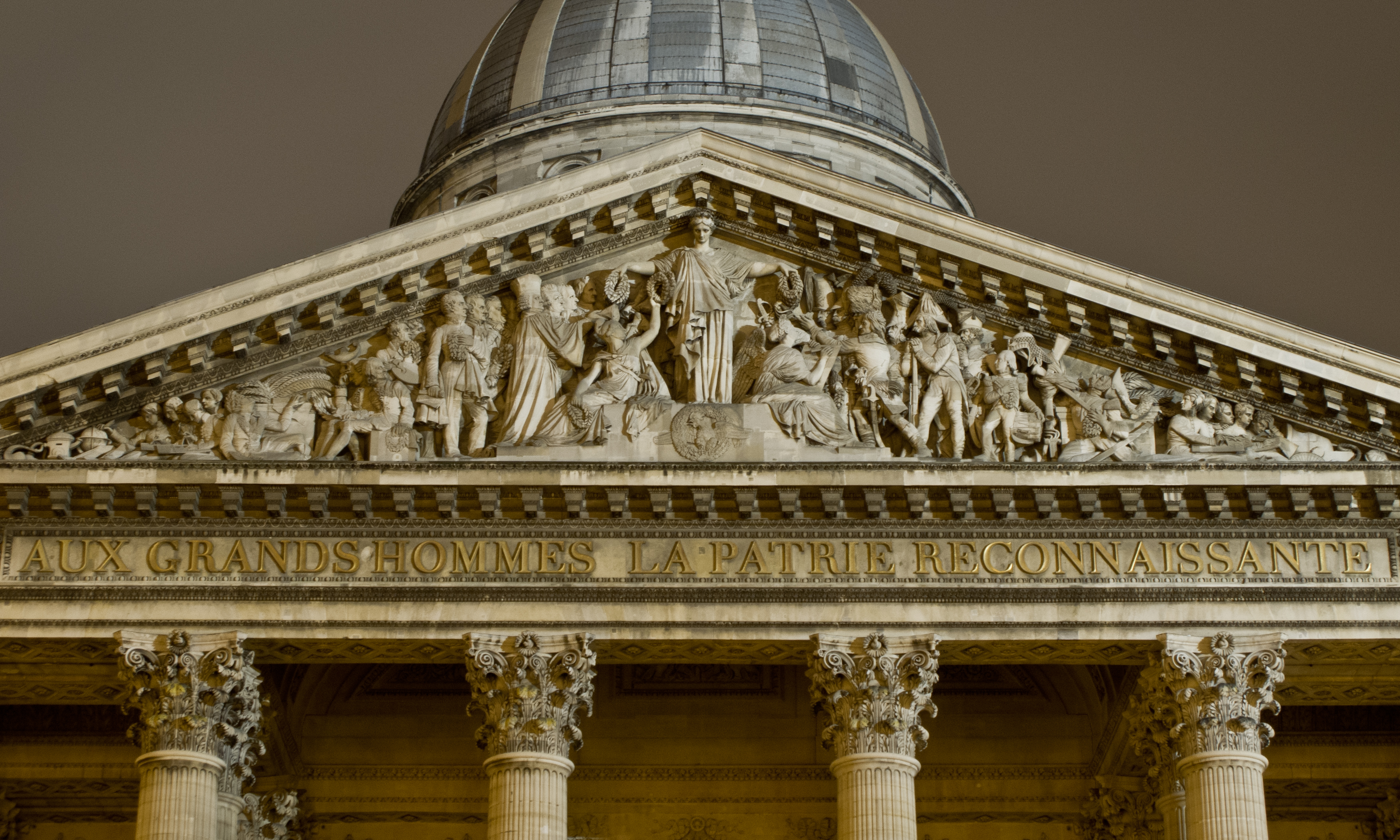
Pediment of the Panthéon with the motto: Aux grands hommes, la patrie reconnaissante ("To its great men, a grateful fatherland").

The term "bien mérité de la Patrie", or the close "bien mérité du pays", is still used in citations awarding the Legion of Honour. For instance, the city of Verdun was awarded the Legion of Honour on 12 September 1916 for

Since the last 21 February, the city of Verdun, in her fierce resolution to maintain her territory unviolated, oppose to the army of the invader a resistance that inspires admiration to the world. The marvelous heroism of her defenders, united to the firmness of the soul of her population, has forever made illustrious the name of this valliant city. It is the duty of the Government of the Republic to proclaim that the city of Verdun has bien mérité de la patrie (Note: Depuis le 21 février dernier, la ville de Verdun, dans sa farouche résolution de maintenir son territoire inviolé, oppose à l'armée de l'envahisseur une résistance qui fait l'admiration du monde. Le merveilleux héroïsme de ses défenseurs, uni à la fermeté d'âme de sa population, a rendu illustre à jamais le nom de cette vaillante cité. Il est du devoir du Gouvernement de la République de proclamer que la ville de Verdun a bien mérité de la patrie.)

The pediment of the Panthéon carries the closely related mention "Aux grands hommes, la patrie reconnaissante" ("To its great men, a grateful fatherland").

== Notes and references ==
=== Bibliography ===
- Rouvier, Charles (1868). Histoire des marins français sous la République, de 1789 à 1803 (in French). Arthus Bertrand.
