= French ship Argonaute (1798) =

Ship of the line of the French Navy

- Scale model of Achille, sister ship of French ship Argonaute (1798), on display at the Musée national de la Marine in Paris.

History

France
- Name: Argonaute
- Namesake: Argonauts
- Ordered: 10 July 1794
- Builder: Lorient shipyard
- Laid down: 10 July 1794
- Launched: 22 December 1798
- Commissioned: September 1799
- Decommissioned: 1805
- Fate: Exchanged with Spain, 1806

Spain
- Name: Argonauta
- Acquired: 1806
- Fate: Broken up

General characteristics
- Class & type: Téméraire-class ship of the line
- Displacement: 3,069 tonneaux
- Tons burthen: 1,537 port tonneaux
- Length: 55.87 m (183 ft 4 in)
- Beam: 14.46 m (47 ft 5 in)
- Draught: 7.15 m (23.5 ft)
- Depth of hold: 7.15 m (23 ft 5 in)
- Sail plan: Full-rigged ship
- Crew: 705
- Armament: 74 guns: Lower gun deck: 28 × 36 pdr guns; Upper gun deck: 30 × 18 pdr guns; Forecastle and Quarterdeck: 16 × 8 pdr guns

Argonaute was a 74-gun Téméraire-class ship of the line built for the French Navy during the 1790s. Completed in 1799, she played a minor role in the Napoleonic Wars.

== Description ==
Designed by Jacques-Noël Sané, the Téméraire-class ships had a length of 55.87 metres (183 ft 4 in), a beam of 14.46 metres (47 ft 5 in) and a depth of hold of 7.15 metres (23 ft 5 in). The ships displaced 3,069 tonneaux and had a mean draught of 7.15 metres (23 ft 5 in). They had a tonnage of 1,537 port tonneaux. Their crew numbered 705 officers and ratings during wartime. They were fitted with three masts and ship rigged.

The muzzle-loading, smoothbore armament of the Téméraire class consisted of twenty-eight 36-pounder long guns on the lower gun deck and thirty 18-pounder long guns on the upper gun deck. On the quarterdeck and forecastle were a total of sixteen 8-pounder long guns. Beginning with the ships completed after 1787, the armament of the Téméraires began to change with the addition of four 36-pounder obusiers on the poop deck (dunette). Some ships had instead twenty 8-pounders.

== Construction and career ==
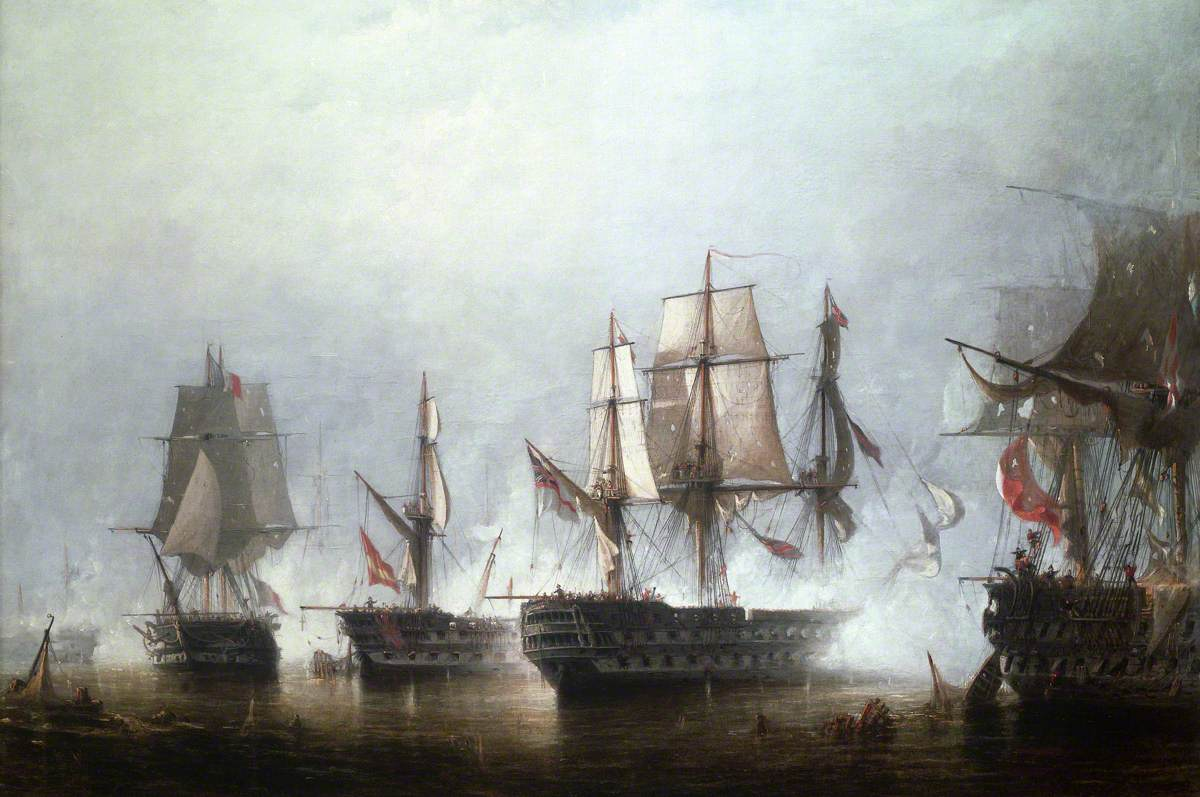
The Battle of Trafalgar, 21 October. On the left the French Swiftsure, next to her the Spanish Bahama, then HMS Colossus firing into the French Argonaute. Painting by Richard Henry Nibbs

Argonaute was ordered on 10 July 1794 and laid down at the Arsenal de Lorient in September. A shortage of timber delayed her launching until 22 December 1798 and the ship was completed in September 1799. Under Vice-amiral Villaret de Joyeuse, Argonaute took part in the Saint-Domingue expedition in 1802. She took part in the Battle of Trafalgar in October 1805, and managed to return to Cádiz. Unable to leave the harbour because of the British blockade and damage, she was exchanged for the Vencedor on 18 December 1806. She was renamed Argonauta, but was converted into a prison ship.

== See also ==
- Jacques Bedout
