= Mentioned in dispatches =

Military distinction of merit

To be mentioned in dispatches (or despatches) describes a member of the armed forces of a nation whose name appears in an official report written by a superior officer and sent to the high command, in which their gallant or meritorious action in the face of the enemy is described.

In some countries, a service member's name being mentioned in dispatches is a condition for being awarded certain decorations.

Being mentioned in dispatches entitles a recipient to wear a small metallic oak leaf (lotus leaf in India) device, but does not bestow an entitlement to post-nominal letters.

== United Kingdom, British Empire and Commonwealth of Nations ==
=== United Kingdom ===
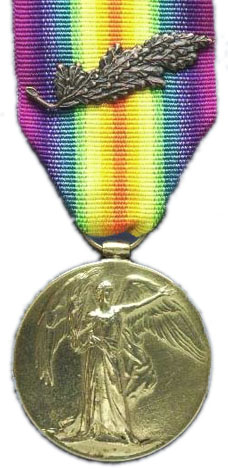
A Victory Medal 1914–18 with a Mention in Dispatches device

Servicemen and women of the United Kingdom or the Commonwealth who are mentioned in dispatches are not awarded a medal for their actions, but receive a certificate and wear an oak leaf device on the ribbon of the appropriate campaign medal. A smaller version of the oak leaf device is attached to the ribbon when worn alone.

Prior to 2014, only one device could be worn on a ribbon, irrespective of the number of times the recipient was mentioned in dispatches. Where no campaign medal is awarded, the oak leaf is worn directly on the coat after any medal ribbons. In the British Armed Forces, the despatch is published in the London Gazette.

Prior to 1914, no decoration existed to signify a mention in dispatches, although sometimes a medal for gallantry could be awarded in its place.

For 1914–1918 and up to 10 August 1920, the device consisted of a spray of oak leaves in bronze worn on the ribbon of the Victory Medal. Those who did not receive the Victory Medal wore the device on the British War Medal. Established in 1919, it was retroactive to August 1914. An example of the frequency of being mentioned in dispatches is twenty-five out of 1,000 members of the Royal Newfoundland Regiment were so honoured in the First World War. In all, 141,082 mentions were recorded in the London Gazette between 1914 and 1920.

From 1920 to 1993, the device consisted of a single bronze oak leaf, worn on the ribbon of the appropriate campaign medal, including the War Medal for a mention during the Second World War. The Canadian Armed Forces still use the bronze oak leaf device.

Since 1993, changes have been made in respect of the United Kingdom armed forces:

For awards made from September 1993, the oak leaf has been in silver. The criteria were also made more specific, it now being defined as an operational gallantry award for acts of bravery during active operations.

From 2003, in addition to British campaign medals, the device can be worn on United Nations, NATO and EU medals.

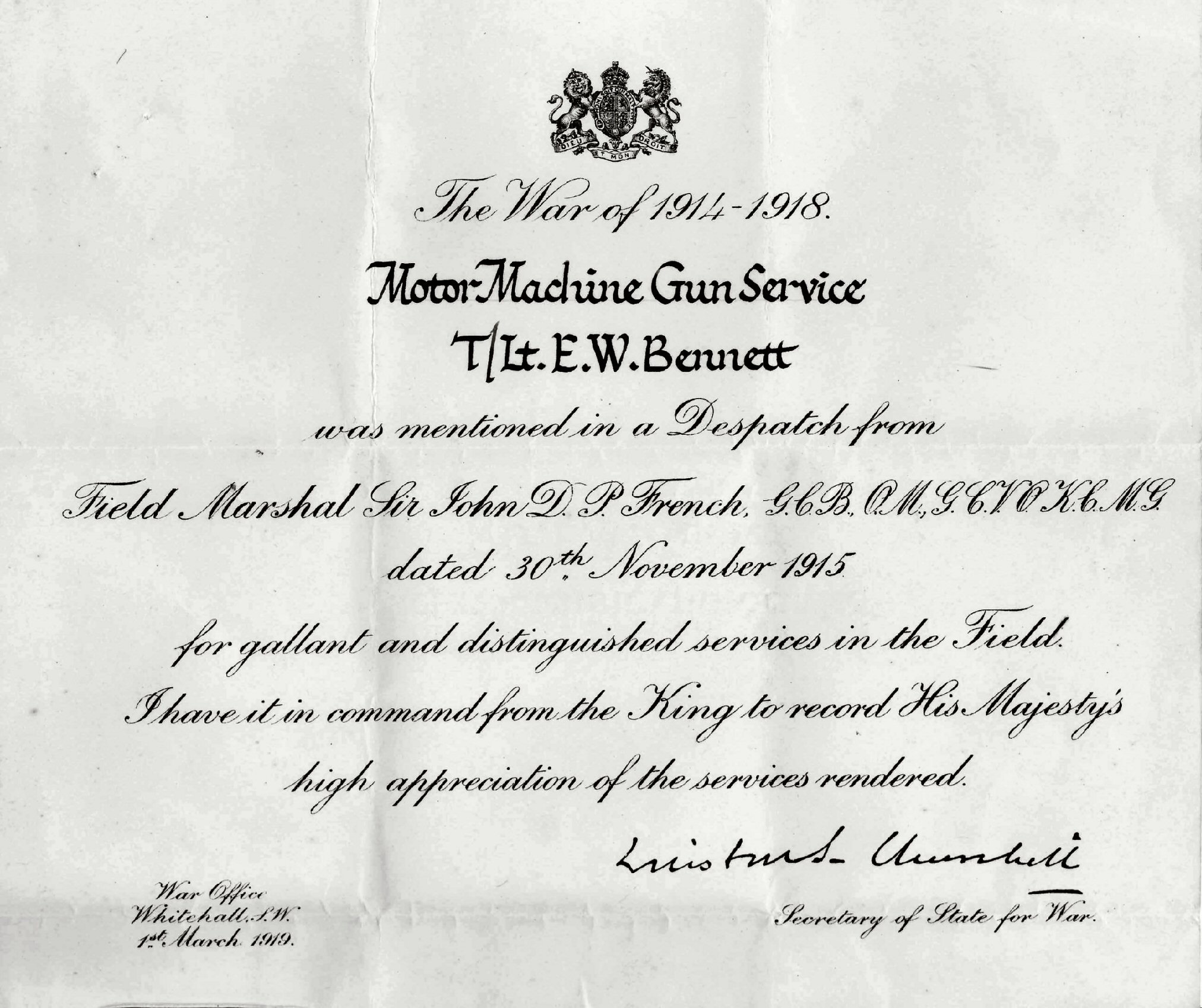
Formal notice of a soldier in the Motor Machine Gun Service mentioned in dispatches, by Field Marshal Sir John French for gallantry at the Battle of Neuve Chapelle, signed by Secretary of State for War Winston Churchill.

Prior to 1979, a mention in dispatches was one of three awards that could be made posthumously, the others being the Victoria Cross and George Cross. The 1979 reform allowed all gallantry decorations to be awarded posthumously.

Examples of soldiers who were mentioned with unusual frequency include General Sir Richard O'Connor who was mentioned a remarkable thirteen times (nine times in the First World War, once in Palestine in 1939, and a further three times in the Second World War). The British First World War Victoria Cross recipient John Vereker, later Field Marshal Viscount Gort, received a total of nine MiDs, as did the Canadian general Sir Arthur Currie. The Australian general Gordon Bennett was mentioned in dispatches a total of eight times during the First World War, as was Field Marshal Sir John Dill.

Below are illustrations of the device being worn on a variety of campaign medal ribbons:

Victory Medal	First World War
Naval General Service Medal	Campaign Service (1920–1962)
Army & RAF; General Service Medal	Campaign Service (1920–1962)
War Medal 1939–1945	Second World War
Korea Medal	Korean War
General Service Medal	Campaign Service (1962–1993)
Vietnam Medal	Vietnam War
Gulf Medal	Gulf War
Silver oak leaf device	Awards since 1993

=== Australia ===
Australian service personnel are no longer eligible to be mentioned in dispatches. Since 15 January 1991, when the Australian Honours System was established, the MiD has been replaced by the Australian decorations: the Commendation for Gallantry and the Commendation for Distinguished Service. Similarly, the equivalents of the MiD for acts of bravery by civilians and by soldiers not engaged with the enemy have also been reformed. The reformed and comprehensive system is now as follows:

- The Commendation for Gallantry is now the fourth level decoration for gallantry.
- The Commendation for Brave Conduct recognises acts of bravery carried out by soldiers not directly fighting the enemy and by civilians in war or peace.
- The Commendation for Distinguished Service, a third level distinguished service decoration, recognises distinguished general service, for exemplary performance in fields such as training, maintenance and administration.

Commendation for Gallantry
Commendation for Brave Conduct
Commendation for Distinguished Service

=== Canada ===
A mention in dispatches – in French, citation à l'ordre du jour – gives recognition from a senior commander for acts of brave or meritorious service, normally in the field. The mention in dispatches is among the list of awards presented by the governor general of Canada. Recipients receive a bronze oak leaf insignia, worn on the ribbon of the relevant mission medal. Historically, MID was awarded during both World Wars and the Korean War, later reintroduced in 1990. As of November 2024, 283 MIDs had been awarded, each accompanied by a citation certificate. Master Corporal Graham Ragsdale's performance during Operation Anaconda in southeastern Afghanistan was mentioned in dispatches.

=== India ===
Mention in dispatches has been used since 1947 to recognize distinguished and meritorious service in operational areas and acts of gallantry which are not of a sufficiently high order to warrant the grant of gallantry awards.

Eligible personnel include all Army, Navy and Air Force personnel including personnel of the Reserve Forces, Territorial Army, Militia and other lawfully constituted armed forces, members of the Nursing Service and civilians working under or with the armed forces.

Personnel can be mentioned in dispatches posthumously and multiple awards are also possible. A recipient of a mention in a dispatch is entitled to wear an emblem, in the form of a lotus leaf on the ribbon of the relevant campaign medal. They are also issued with an official certificate from the Ministry of Defence.

=== Pakistan ===
Under the current Pakistani military honours system, the Imtiazi Sanad is conferred upon any member of the Pakistan Armed Forces who is mentioned in dispatches for an act of gallantry that does not qualify for a formal gallantry award.

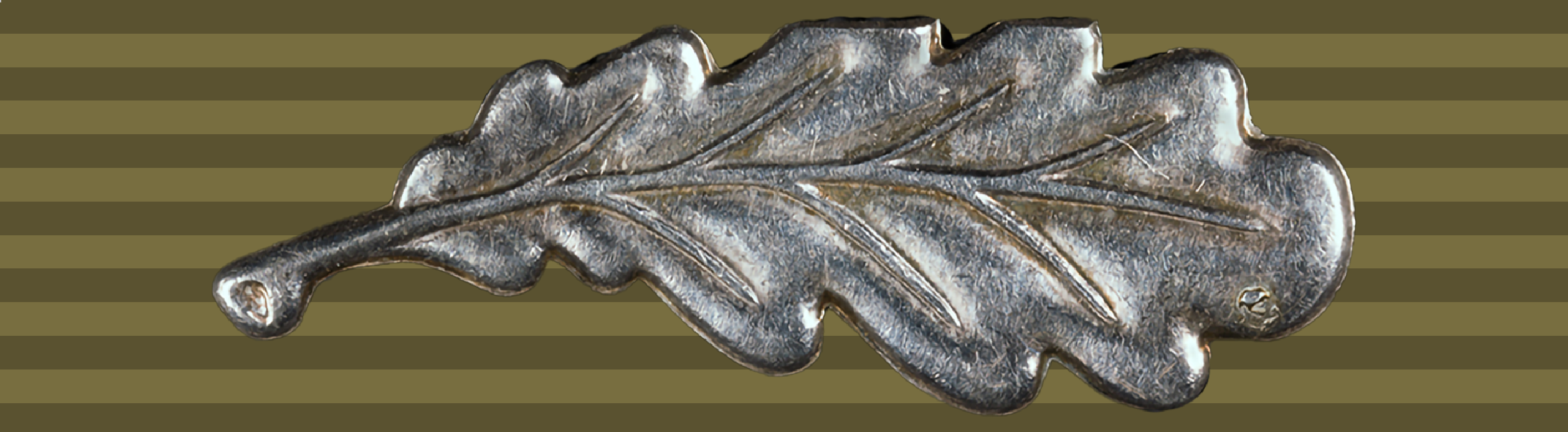
The Imtiazi Sanad of the Pakistan Armed Forces

=== South Africa ===
In 1920, the Minister of Defence of the Union of South Africa was empowered to award a multiple-leaved bronze oak leaf emblem to all servicemen and servicewomen mentioned in dispatches during the First World War for valuable services in action. The emblem, which was regarded as a decoration, was worn on the ribbon of the Victory Medal (Union of South Africa). Only one emblem was worn, irrespective of the number of times a recipient had been mentioned.

The Afrikaans rendition of mentioned in dispatches is Eervolle Vermelding in Berigte.

In 1943, the Union Defence Force confirmed the availability of the British award, the bronze oak leaf, for acts of bravery, in contact with the enemy, which fell just short of the standard required for the granting of a decoration, or for valuable services not necessarily in immediate contact with the enemy.

The mention in dispatches (MiD) was one of only four awards which could be made posthumously. The others were the Victoria Cross, the George Cross, and the King's Commendation (South Africa). The oak leaf emblem was worn on the ribbon of the War Medal 1939–1945.

The King's Commendation (South Africa) (1939–45) was denoted by a bronze King Protea flower emblem worn on the ribbon of the Africa Service Medal, for valuable services in connection with the Second World War. It could be awarded posthumously and was the equivalent of a mention in dispatches for services rendered away from the battlefield.

The MiD and the King's Commendation (SA) were the only decorations that could be approved by the South African Minister of Defence without reference to the King.

== France ==
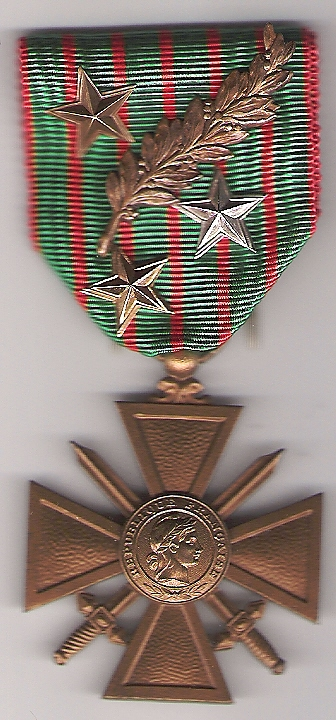
A Croix de Guerre (awarded to Col. Brébant) with four acknowledgments: 1 bronze palm 1 silver gilt star 1 silver star 1 bronze star

Since the French Revolution, France has had the custom of declaring deserving citizens or groups to have bien mérité de la Patrie ("well deserved the recognition of the Country"). This sentiment is continued to this day in the formulation of the citations that accompany medals.

In the French military, mentions in dispatches – or more accurately, mention in orders (citation dans les ordres) – are made by senior commanders, from the level of a Regimental commanding officer to the Commander-in-Chief, in the orders they give to their unit, recognizing the gallantry of an action performed some time before. There are two kinds of mentions: mentions with cross, for bravery in presence of the enemy, and mentions without cross, for bravery not in presence of the enemy.

=== Mentions with cross ===
The citations are given for acts of gallantry by any member of the French military or its allies and are, depending on the degree, roughly the equivalent of the US Bronze Star Medal or Silver Star and the UK Mention in Dispatches or Military Cross and, formerly, the Military Medal.

Mentions made during the two World Wars or colonial conflicts were accompanied with awards of a Croix de Guerre or a Croix de la Valeur Militaire, with attachments on the ribbon depending on the mention's degree : the lowest degree is represented by a bronze star while the highest degree is represented by a bronze palm.

- a bronze star for those who had been mentioned at the regiment or brigade level.
- a silver star for those who had been mentioned at the division level.
- a silver gilt star for those who had been mentioned at the corps level.
- a bronze palm for those who had been mentioned at the army level.
- a silver palm represents five bronze ones.
- a silver gilt palm for those who had been mentioned at the Free French Forces level (World War II only).

A unit can also be mentioned in dispatches. The unit standard is then decorated with the corresponding Croix. After two mentions, the men of the unit are entitled to wear a fourragère.

First World War	Colonial Wars 1920–1926	Second World War	Indochina, Madagascar, Korea, Suez Crisis, Gulf and Kosovo	Tunisia, Algeria, every military operation where TOE Cross is not awarded
1914–1918 War Cross	TOE War Cross	1939–1945 War Cross	TOE War Cross	Cross for Military Valour

=== Mentions without cross ===
Since 2004, mentions for bravery not involving actual combat with the enemy are awarded with a gold Médaille de la Défense nationale (National Defence Medal) and with the same attachments as the Croix de guerre. Before 2004, these mentions were recorded in the service member record, but not recognized with any decoration.
