= HMS Pluto (1782) =

British naval sloop and merchantman 1782–1817

History

Great Britain
- Name: HMS Pluto
- Ordered: 4 December 1780
- Builder: Joshua Stewart, Sandgate
- Laid down: January 1781
- Launched: 1 February 1782
- Fate: Sold 19 July 1817

United Kingdom
- Acquired: 1817 by purchase
- Fate: Wrecked September 1817

General characteristics
- Class & type: Tisiphone-class fire ship
- Tons burthen: 42642/94 (bm)
- Length: Overall: 108 ft 10 1/2 in (33.19 m); Keel: 90 ft 7 in (27.61 m)
- Beam: 29 ft 9 in (9.07 m)
- Depth of hold: 9 ft 0 in (2.74 m)
- Complement: Fireship: 55; Sloop: 121
- Armament: Fireship: 8 × 12-pounder guns; Sloop (originally): 12 guns; Sloop (later): 14 × 12-pounder carronades + 2 × 6-pounder chase guns + 4 swivel guns

HMS Pluto was a 14-gun fire ship of the Royal Navy launched in 1782. Pluto was converted to a sloop in 1793. She spent the period of the French Revolutionary Wars on the Newfoundland station where she captured a French naval vessel. During the Napoleonic Wars Pluto was stationed in the Channel. There she detained numerous merchant vessels trading with France or elsewhere. Pluto was laid up in 1809 and sold in 1817 into mercantile service. The mercantile Pluto ran aground near Margate on 31 August 1817 and filled with water.

== Career ==
Pluto conducted some convoying cruises in 1782 but apparently was laid up after hostilities with France ended. Between 1788 and 1791 she underwent re-coppering and refitting.

In March 1791, Commander Robert Faulknor commissioned Pluto. She was paid off in September. She then underwent refitting between November 1792 and February 1793. She was fitted as a sloop, but not rated as such. Commander James N. Morris commissioned Pluto in November 1792. He sailed for Newfoundland on 16 May 1793, after the commencement of war with France.

Pluto captured the French 16-gun brig-aviso Lutin off Newfoundland on 25 July 1793. Lloyd's List reported that Pluto had captured a French packet ship bound for France from Martinique. It further reported that the packet had a crew of 100 men and had suffered one man killed and seven wounded. Morris's biography stated that the action took some 15 minutes, that Lutin had a crew of 70 men, and that she had suffered three killed and four wounded. The Royal Navy took Lutin into service as HMS Lutin and registered her at Newfoundland on 19 December.

Circa October 1793, Commander Richard Raggett replaced Morris on the Newfoundland station.

Between 1796 and 1798, Commander Ambrose Crofton commanded Pluto. Crofton had transferred from Lutin. On 2 March 1798 Lloyd's List reported that Ennemer, a prize to Pluto, had come into Deal from Lisbon.

In March 1798, Pluto's captain was Commander Henry Folkes Edgell. He sailed her for the Newfoundland station on 30 July. In December Lloyd's List reported that the "Pluto Frigate" had captured and sent into St John's, Newfoundland a large Spanish ship with a cargo of sugar and cotton worth £40,000. A report a week later gave the name of the vessel as American Star, Macklin, master. She had been sailing from Havana to Cadiz. On 20 January 1800 American Star, a prize to Pluto, arrived at Gravesend from Newfoundland.

On 24 May 1800, Pluto captured Nordiska Wanskapen.

On 14 October 1800, Pluto captured Pearl.

In 1801, Pluto was engaged in surveying. On 20 May Pluto and Voltiguer captured Aurora. On 11 June Pluto captured Orlando. (Note: The prize money for a seaman was 19s 1¼d.)

Commander Edgell remained captain of Pluto until 29 April 1802 when he received promotion to the rank of post captain.

Commander Robert Forbes replaced Edgell. She underwent refitting between July and September 1803; by one report Commander Edward Kittoe recommissioned Pluto in August, for the Channel. However, his biography does not mention this and one may infer from the biography that he did not actually command her.

In late December 1803 Pluto and Merlin detained Traveller, Hall, master, which was sailing from Alexandria to Havre. They sent Traveller into Portsmouth.

Pluto was part of a squadron that on 25 May 1804 captured Matilda.

On 23 July a squadron of Royal Navy bomb (mortar) vessels, shelled Havre. Pluto was among the vessels protecting the bombs from French luggers seeking to come out of the harbour to engage the bombs. The day before, the squadron captured Shepherdess; Pluto shared in the proceeds. After the bombardment, on 31 July the bomb HMS Explosion captured Postilion. The rest of the squadron including Pluto, shared in the prize money.

On 17 September 1804 Pluto, Richard Janverin, commander, captured the Prussian barque Industria. (Note: The prize money for a seaman was worth £2 18s 8½d.)

On 6 December Amphion, Blanchard, master, came into Cowes. She had been sailing from Dort to Cadiz whenPluto detained her.

In May 1805 Commander Richard Janverin assumed command of Pluto, for the Downs station. In July Pluto detained and sent into Portsmouth the galiot Jonge Gerrett, which had been carrying a cargo of hides.

On 15 July Pluto captured Freundschaft.

In November Pluto detained and sent into Plymouth William, Haster, master. William had been sailing from New Orleans to Cherbourg. Diane, Tibbetts, master, had been sailing from New York when Pluto detained her. Diana ran onshore at Portsmouth. Next Pluto detained and sent into Plymouth Copenhagen, which had been sailing from Île de France to Copenhagen. (Note: This may have been Stadt Copenhagen, which Pluto had captured on 17 September 1805.) Then Pluto detained and sent into Portsmouth Wilhlmina, Hillier, master, which had been sailing from St Thomas to Tonningen. Wilhelmina arrived at Portsmouth on 27 November.

In March 1806 Pluto detained and sent into Portsmouth Enpracht, Hanny, master, which had been sailing from Antwerp.

The next month, Pluto detained and sent into London Ann and Sally, which had been sailing from the River Plate. Pluto also sent into Portsmouth Minerva, Love, master, from the River Plate and Plymouth. In late May Pluto sent into Portsmouth Rettenberg, from Trieste to Tonningen.

In August, Pluto detained and sent into Portsmouth Neptunus, Roos, master, from Luban to Lisbon.

In November Pluto detained and sent into Portsmouth Zevey Fruenden, Balden, master, which had been sailing from Bordeaux to Tonningen. In the middle of November Pluto detained and sent into Portsmouth two vessels sailing from Bordeaux to Tonnngen: Mercury, an American vessel, and Andromache.

In January 1807 Pluto and the revenue cutter Beagle sent into Dartmouth Lisette, Petersen, master, a Danish vessel sailing from Batavia to Copenhagen. (Note: Lisette was liberated in early May.) A week later Pluto sent into Dartmouth the American vessel Adventure, Ropes, master, which had been sailing from st Lucar's to Altona.

In April Pluto sent into Portsmouth the Danish vessel Naarstegeit, which had been sailing from Bordeaux to Tonningen. Later that month Pluto detained and sent into Portsmouth the American vessel Melpomene.

On 21 April 1807 Pluto was in company with Liberty and Sprightly when they detained the American brig Virginia, Frederick Coffin, master.

In August Pluto detained and sent into Portsmouth the American vessel Ulysses, which had been sailing from Bordeaux to Tonningen. The next month Pluto detained and sent into Cowes Suffolk, Thompson, master, which had come from Leghorn.

In October Pluto detained and sent into Portsmouth the American vessel Yorrick, which had been sailing from Boston to Amsterdam.

Pluto detained and sent into Portsmouth in July 1808 Intercourse, Cutts, master, which had been sailing from the coast of Spain. The salvage money notice for the recapture of Intercourse gave the date of capture as 9 July. It also gave the name of her master as Sylvester Strong.

Pluto was laid up in ordinary at Portsmouth in February 1809. At some point she was re-rated as a receiving ship.

In March 1809 prize or salvage money was paid for:

- Prussian galiot Jonge Pieter, captured 19 April 1805;
- Prussian galiot Snelbeidt, captured 19 March 1806;
- Prssian galliot Eintracht, captured 19 March 1806;
- Hamburg brig Neuve Adler, captured 9 April 1807; and,
- American ship Minerva, captured 21 April 1806.

Disposal: The "Principal Officers and Commissioners of His Majesty's Navy" first offered the "Pluto sloop, of 426 tons", lying at Portsmouth, for sale on 18 September 1816. She finally sold at Portsmouth to Mr. Warwick on 19 July 1817 for £950.

She became the mercantile Pluto but was lost before she even appeared in Lloyd's Register.

== Fate ==
Pluto was driven ashore and wrecked on the Foreness Rock, off Margate, Kent on 31 August 1817. She was on a voyage from Portsmouth to London.
