= Action of 31 July 1793 =

1793 battle of the War of the First Coalition

Coordinates: 40°15′50″N 73°50′10″W

- Part of the War of the First Coalition
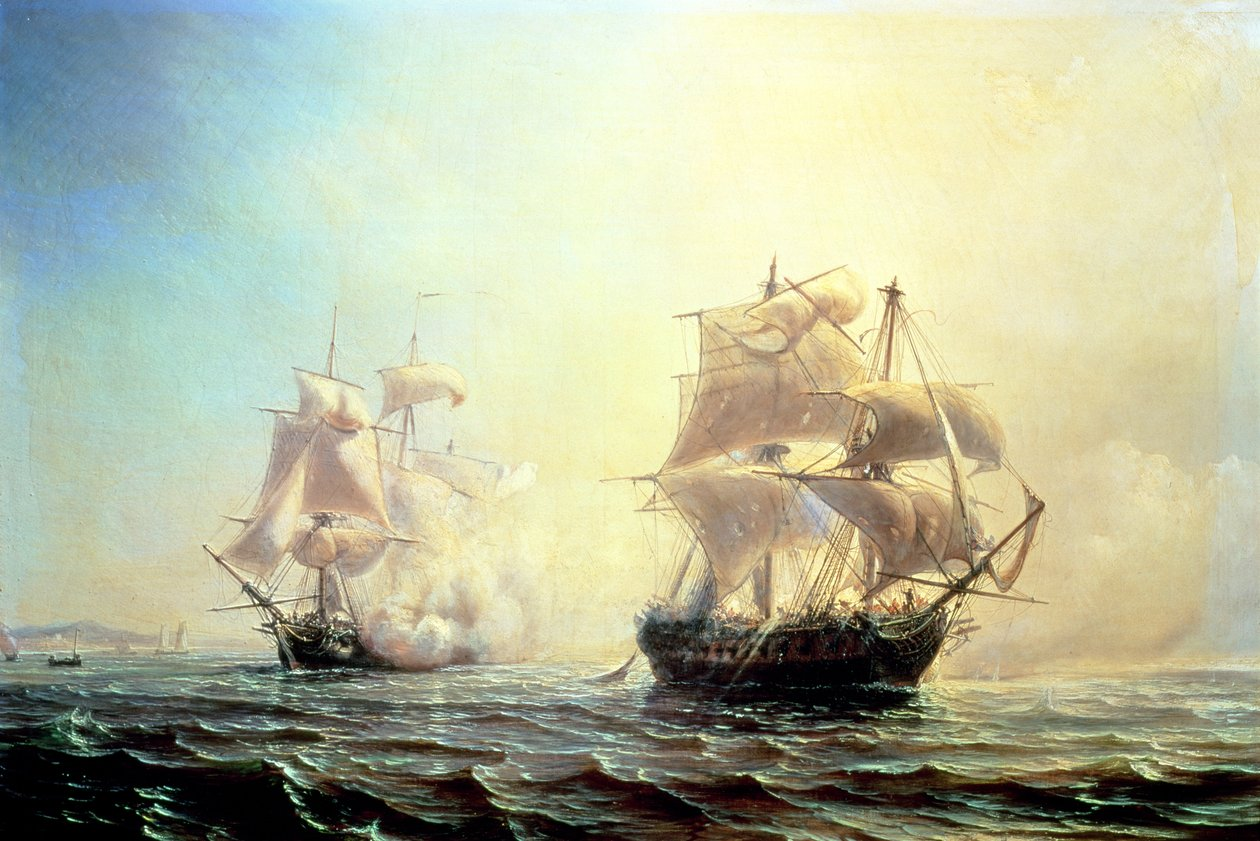
- Combat Between the Frigate 'L'Embuscade' and the 'Boston' in the Port of New York in 1793
Date	31 July 1793
Location	off New Jersey, Atlantic Ocean
Result	Inconclusive

Belligerents
Great Britain	France

Commanders and leaders
George Courtenay †	Jean-Baptiste-François Bompart

Strength
1 frigate	1 frigate

Casualties and losses
10 killed 24 wounded	50 killed or wounded

The action of 31 July 1793 was an inconclusive engagement between a frigate from the Royal Navy and another from the French Navy off the New Jersey coastline in the first year of the War of the First Coalition. The British captain, George Courtenay of HMS Boston, had arrived off New York City on 28 May and deliberately disguised his ship as a French vessel, fooling a French officer into coming aboard and making him a prisoner of war. Courtenay then sent a message into New York, where he knew a French frigate lay at anchor, challenging the French captain to battle within the next three days. The challenge was accepted and widely disseminated throughout the city, so that when Captain Jean-Baptiste-François Bompart of Embuscade sailed out to meet Courtenay on the morning of 31 July, the shore was crowded with thousands of sightseers.

The engagement between the ships was fiercely contested, but the smaller and more lightly armed Boston seemed to be taking the more serious damage when at 6:20 Captain Courtenay was thrown to the deck. What happened next has been subject to debate, with the second-in-command, Lieutenant John Edwards claiming that Courtenay had been killed and he was thrown overboard as was the custom at the time. However rumours subsequently circulated that Courtenay had only been knocked unconscious when Edwards gave the order to jettison him, a story that his family credited and was later taken up by the contemporary historian Edward Pelham Brenton, although historian William James subsequently defended Edwards' actions.

With Courtenay gone, Boston continued to suffer severe damage until just after 07:00, when the remaining officers ordered all surviving sails set and the British ship attempted to escape. Although Bompart pursued, by 08:00 the strain had proved too much for his ship and he fell back. After a close encounter with French ships in the Delaware River, Boston eventually escaped to St John's, Newfoundland, while Embuscade refitted in New York.

== Background ==
In February 1793 the newly formed French Republic declared war on Great Britain, extending the French Revolutionary Wars that had begun the year before on the continent. The French Navy was in a state of upheaval due to the social consequences of the French Revolution, and as a result found itself at a disadvantage to the Royal Navy, which had been preparing for war since June 1792. In response, the French sent several frigate squadrons to sea, including their newest ships and best sailors and officers in an attempt to disrupt British commerce in the early stages of the war. One such squadron was sent in April 1793 to the United States, carrying the French ambassador to the United States, Edmond-Charles Genêt. After the ambassador disembarked, the squadron, under the command of Captain Jean-Baptiste-François Bompart, dispersed to raid British shipping along the coast, capturing or destroying more than 60 merchant vessels before retiring to American ports for repairs.

The French threat on the American Seaboard was met by Royal Navy frigates operating out of Halifax, Nova Scotia, under orders to watch and blockade French movements in American ports. One such ship was the 32-gun frigate HMS Boston, a small and old vessel under the command of Captain George Courtenay. Courtenay was under orders to watch New York City, where one of the frigates was known to be at anchor. On 28 June 1793, Boston arrived off New York, Courtenay deliberately disguising his ship to resemble a French vessel by having the French-speaking members of his crew talk loudly on the quarterdeck while an American pilot boat was within earshot. The French ship in New York was Bompart's ship Embuscade, a large and powerful vessel that had been built less than three years before and carried a combined broadside weight of 240 pounds (108.9 kg), 30 pounds (13.6 kg) more than that of Boston. Sighting the strange ship off the harbour, Bompart sent a boat with his lieutenant, an American from Boston named Whitynow, and twelve men to investigate. Although he was suspicious of the strange vessel, Whitynow was finally convinced that the ship was a French vessel after conferring with the pilots, and came aboard only to discover his error when Courtenay seized him and his men as prisoners of war.

Courtenay suggested to his prisoner that he would be keen to meet Bompart in battle, and he agreed to send a message into New York via the pilot boat with a challenge for Bompart to bring Embuscade out of the neutral harbour and meet Boston off Sandy Hook. The pilot was initially unable to locate the French captain, and so instead posted the challenge in a coffeehouse in the city, from where the news spread rapidly. Bompart came to learn of it, and spent the next two days preparing his warship; historian Edward Pelham Brenton has claimed that Bompart was joined by 100 armed American volunteers, which he calls "a flagrant violation of the law of nations". After a consultation among the French officers Embuscade sailed from New York on the night of 30 July, although Courtenay was almost forced to miss the rendezvous: on the afternoon of 30 July a large French battle squadron of the ships of the line Éole and Patriote, four frigates and six smaller vessels passed northwards along the New Jersey coast, heading for New York. In the face of such a powerful force Boston was temporarily forced to withdraw to open water, but the squadron did not deviate to investigate the frigate and had passed into New York harbour by nightfall, allowing Courtenay to return to his station.

== Battle ==
At 03:00 on 31 May, lookouts on Boston reported a large ship approaching from the northeast. Courtenay readied his ship for battle and at 03:30 the ship passed at a distance of 3.5 nautical miles (6.5 km) and was shortly afterwards recognised as a frigate flying the French tricolour. Unsure of the newcomer's identity, Courtenay raised the same flag and in response the strange ship raised a blue flag bearing a white cross, identifying itself as Embuscade, come to meet his challenge. At 04:00 both ships turned eastwards, continuing for 45 minutes until Boston slowed and raised British colours. As the British ship slowed the French vessel overtook at 1.5 nautical miles (2.8 km) distance and at 05:00 Boston tacked towards the French ship, Embuscade slowing so that Courtenay's frigate passed along the starboard broadside. Boston fired first at 05:05, followed immediately by a volley from Embuscade. Both ships then tacked again, by this time approximately 12 nautical miles (22 km) southeast of Navesink, New Jersey. News of the impending battle had spread rapidly through the countryside, and thousands of spectators had gathered on the New Jersey beaches to watch the engagement.

After fifteen minutes of combat, Boston lost its cross-jack yard and by 05:45 had suffered significant damage to its rigging and sails, rendering the ship significantly less manoeuvrable than Embuscade. At 06:10 the main topmast was knocked over and the mizzen mast badly damaged, and ten minutes later, as he was exhorting his men to greater efforts, a cannonball struck the rail where Captain Courtenay and Royal Marine Lieutenant James Butler were standing. Butler was killed instantly and Courtenay fell to the deck unresponsive, possibly killed. Believing his commander to be dead, Lieutenant John Edwards assumed command and had the bodies thrown overboard in an effort to prevent his sailors losing morale from the death of their captain. Boston continued to suffer under the heavier guns of the French ship and by 06:40 the mizzen mast was close to collapse and much of the remaining rigging had been shot away. Casualties mounted, with Lieutenant Edwards and Lieutenant Alexander Kerr both badly wounded, the latter blinded in one eye and the former struck on the head and briefly rendered unconscious.

With their officers gone and their ship in an increasingly battered state, panic began to spread through the British crew. In response Edwards was assisted to the deck and assumed command. While confusion overtook Boston, Bompart remained in command of his ship despite heavy casualties and manoeuvred around to the British ship's stern, intending to finish the battle with a raking broadside. With difficulty Edwards wore away from the threat and recognised that continued resistance would be futile, turning Boston towards the open sea away from Embuscade and setting all remaining sail to escape. At 07:07, Bompart began in pursuit, but his ship was also damaged and could not match the speed of the smaller British vessel. At 08:00, with Boston 4 nautical miles (7.4 km) ahead and stretching the distance, the French captain abandoned the chase and turned back towards New York.

== Aftermath ==
So badly damaged was Bompart's ship that he was not able to dock in New York until 2 August and repairs to his vessel, including the replacement of all three masts, were not completed until 9 October. Accounts of the battle in the American media claimed that Embuscade's losses amounted to 50 men killed or wounded during the action from a crew of 340 men. Boston limped southwards in desperate need of repairs and initially attempted to anchor in the Delaware River. On taking on a pilot, Lieutenant Edwards was informed that the French frigates Concorde and Inconstante were anchored at Mud Fort. Aware that his ship would be rapidly overwhelmed by such a force, Edwards disembarked the pilot and sailed north, eventually bringing his battered vessel into St John's, Newfoundland. Losses aboard Boston amounted to ten killed and 24 wounded from a crew of 204, the dead including Captain Courtenay. In recognition of his service, Courtenay's widow was presented with a pension of £500 (the equivalent of £62,700 as of 2025) and his two children with £50 per annum. Edwards' subsequent career was shortened by injury, but Bompart was presented with a gold medal on his return to France, and remained a prominent figure in the French Navy, serving at the Glorious First of June in 1794 and leading the French expeditionary force that unsuccessfully attempted to invade Ireland in 1798 and was destroyed at the Battle of Tory Island.

Edwards' report contained his account of Courtenay's death in battle, and it was widely accepted at the time. However, rumours began circulating that Courtenay had not been killed but merely stunned by the blow, and that his death may have come as a result of Edwards order for him to be thrown overboard. This second account was accepted by Courtenay's family and shortly after Edwards' death in January 1823 from the effects of the wound he received in the action with Embuscade, the naval officer and historian Edward Pelham Brenton published his work Naval History of Great Britain from the Year 1783 to 1822, in which he wrote that:

"The action soon began, and continued with great bravery on both sides, until the iron hammock-rail of the quarter-deck being struck by a shot, a part of it took Captain Courteney [sic] on the back of the neck, and he fell, but no blood followed. The first lieutenant immediately caused the body to be thrown overboard, lest, as he said, it should "dishearten the people;" and, after this prudent precaution, hauled away from the enemy, who had no inclination to follow him".

— Edward Pelham Brenton, Naval History of Great Britain from the Year 1783 to 1822, 1823,

This version of events was refuted in 1827 by historian William James, who wrote in response to Brenton that "All we [James] can say to this extraordinary statement is, that our [James'] account was taken chiefly from Boston's log book, and we have not the least reason, from subsequent inquiries, to believe it to be incorrect." Subsequent histories, including William Laird Clowes' book of 1900 and Richard Woodman's of 2001 follow James, but in his 1837 reprint Brenton defended the account and named Alexander Robert Kerr, second lieutenant of Boston during the action, as his source. In the same year a magazine article written by a niece of Captain Courtenay continued to repeat the allegations, stating that "the treacherous or – to say the least of it – the improper and unprofessional conduct of Lieutenant Edwards" had been responsible for his commander's death.

After the battle, the ladies of Halifax launched a subscription to celebrate the crew of HMS Boston. On the other hand, the population of New York had a golden medal made in honour of the crew of Embuscade; Bompart accepted the medal on the condition he would not have to wear it, as the National Convention had banned medals.

== Bibliography ==
- Brenton, Edward Pelham (1837) [1823]. The Naval History of Great Britain, Vol. I. London: Henry Colburn. "Boston."
- Clowes, William Laird (1997) [1900]. The Royal Navy, A History from the Earliest Times to 1900, Volume IV. London: Chatham Publishing. ISBN 1-86176-013-2.
- "Autobiographical Sketches by Mrs. Crawford". The Metropolitan Magazine (LXIX): 391–393. January 1837. Retrieved on 14 January 2010
- James, William (2002) [1827]. The Naval History of Great Britain, Volume 1, 1793–1796. London: Conway Maritime Press. ISBN 0-85177-905-0.
- Mostert, Noel (2007). The Line upon a Wind: The Greatest War Fought at Sea Under Sail 1793–1815. London: Vintage Books. ISBN 978-0-7126-0927-2.
- Rouvier, Charles (1868). Histoire des marins français sous la République, de 1789 à 1803 (in French). Arthus Bertrand.
- Woodman, Richard (2001). The Sea Warriors. London: Constable Publishers. ISBN 1-84119-183-3.
