= French brig Lutin (1788) =

Hasard-class brig-aviso (1788–1796)

History

France
- Name: Lutin
- Builder: Bayonne. Commencé
- Laid down: October 1787
- Launched: February 1788
- Captured: 25 July 1793

Great Britain
- Name: HMS Lutin
- Acquired: 1793 by purchase of a prize
- Fate: Sold 26 January 1796

General characteristics
- Class & type: Hazard-class brig-aviso
- Tons burthen: 180(French "of load"), or 267 (bm)
- Length: Overall: 84 ft 0 in (25.60 m); Keel: 70 ft 9 in (21.56 m)
- Beam: 24 ft 0 in (7.32 m)
- Depth of hold: 11 ft 6 in (3.51 m)
- Complement: 100–110 (French service)
- Armament: French Navy; Originally: 6 × 6-pounder guns; Later: 16 × 6-pounder guns; Royal Navy:12 × 4-pounder guns + 4 × 12-pounder carronades

Lutin was a Hasard-class brig-aviso launched at Bayonne in 1788 for the French Navy. Shortly after the outbreak of war with England, the British Royal Navy captured her off Newfoundland. The British took her into service as HMS Lutin. After some two years on the Newfoundland station Lutin sailed to Plymouth where the Navy sold her.

== Career ==
On 1 June 1788 Lutin sailed from Rochefort to Brest in company with the frigates Gracieuse, Néréide, and Courageuse, and her sister-ships Hazard and Espoir.

In November 1790 Lutin, under the command of lieutenant de vaiseau Prévost de La Croix, carried guns from Saint Lucie to Fort Royal, Guadeloupe, and Saint Barthélemy. She then returned to Rochefort.

In March 1793 Lutin was at Martinique, under the command of commandante Coquet.

=== Capture ===
HMS Pluto captured Lutin off Newfoundland on 25 July 1793. Lloyd's List reported that Pluto had captured a French packet ship bound for France from Martinique. It further reported that the packet had a crew of 100 men and had suffered one man killed and seven wounded. The biography of Commander James N. Morris, Pluto's captain, stated that the action took some 15 minutes, that Lutin had a crew of 70 men, and that she had suffered three killed and four wounded. The Royal Navy took Lutin into service as HMS Lutin and registered her at Newfoundland on 19 December.

== Royal Navy ==
HMS Lutin was commissioned in December 1793 under Commander James Thresher. In June 1794 Commander Ambrose Crofton replaced Thresher. She arrived at Plymouth on 15 November 1795 and was paid off in December. Crofton transferred from Lutin to take command of Pluto.

== Fate ==
Lutin was sold at Plymouth on 26 January 1796 for £800.
