= French frigate Embuscade (1789) =

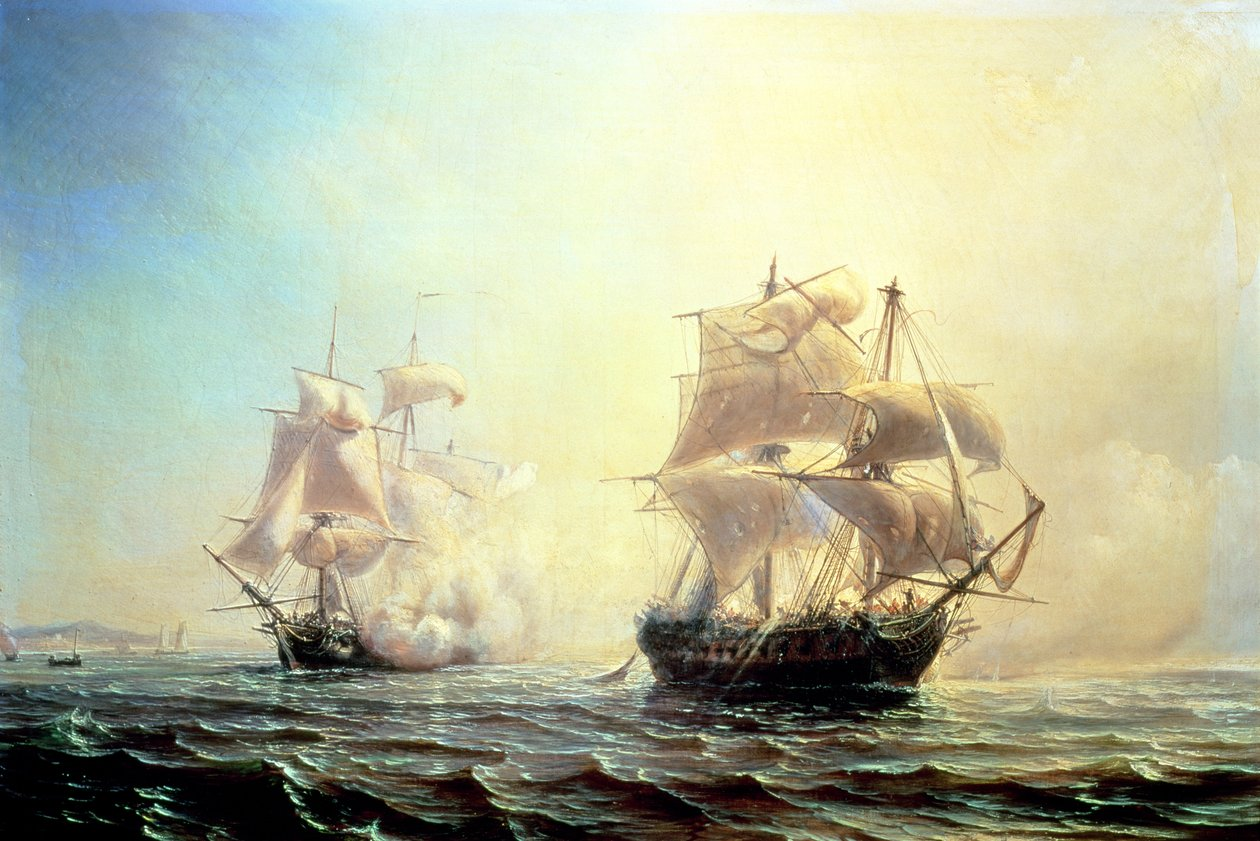
- Embuscade (left) at the action of 31 July 1793

History

France
- Name: Embuscade
- Namesake: "Ambush"
- Builder: Rochefort
- Laid down: 1788
- Launched: 21 September 1789
- In service: June 1790
- Captured: 12 October 1798

Great Britain
- Name: Ambuscade
- Acquired: 12 October 1798
- Renamed: HMS Seine in 1804
- Fate: Broken up in 1813

General characteristics
- Displacement: 1200 tonneaux
- Tons burthen: 563 port tonneaux
- Length: 44 m (144 ft 4 in)
- Beam: 11.2 m (36 ft 9 in)
- Draught: 5.7 m (18 ft 8 in)
- Propulsion: Sail
- Armament: 34 guns
- Armour: Timber

Ambuscade

Embuscade was a 32-gun frigate of the French Navy. She served in the War of the First Coalition before being captured by the British. Renamed HMS Ambuscade and later HMS Seine, she participated in the Napoleonic Wars in the Royal Navy. She was broken up in 1813.

== French service ==
Embuscade, launched in 1789, was constructed in Rochefort. Her captain was Jean-Baptiste-François Bompart, a former privateer who fought in the American War of Independence. In 1792, she escorted convoys to and from Martinique, and ferried Edmond-Charles Genêt to the United States. During the early years of the war, she raided British shipping along the American east coast.

Embuscade arrived in Charleston, South Carolina, on 8 April 1793. She brought Edmond-Charles Genêt to take up his post as the French ambassador to the United States. Then on 31 July, she fought and severely damaged HMS Boston at the action of 31 July 1793. Embuscade returned to France a year later and took part in the Croisière du Grand Hiver in 1795 as part of Pierre Jean Van Stabel's squadron.

On 7 March 1795 Embuscade captured Queen, which was sailing from Tenerife, Canary Islands to London.

== Capture and French Revolutionary Wars ==
In 1798 Captain Bambot was given command of a squadron of ships, including Embuscade, with orders to transport troops to Ireland to fight in the Irish Rebellion of 1798. Along the way, a British fleet learned of the French squadron's position and gave chase. The two forces fought at the Battle of Tory Island, which ended in a decisive French defeat. Embuscade was captured and added to the Royal Navy as Ambuscade.

She was commissioned in August 1800 under the command of Captain the Honourable J. Colvill. On 26 March 1801 she sailed for Jamaica but by 1802 she was back in the English Channel. In September 1802, while under the command of Captain David Colby she became the flagship for Rear-Admiral Edward Thornbrough in the North Sea.

== Napoleonic Wars ==
On 27 August 1803, while under the command of Captain David Atkins, she captured Hendrick and Jan. (Note: The prize money for a petty officer was 12s 9d; for a seaman it was 3s 5d.)

She was renamed HMS Seine in 1804, as the previous Ambuscade had been retaken and was recommissioned under her old name, and the previous Seine had just been lost. In early 1805, Seine captured several vessels on the Jamaica station. The first capture, on 29 January, was the Spanish schooner San Ignacio, which was carrying sundries and which was declared a Droit of Admiralty. (Note: The prize money for a petty officer was 9s 0d; for a seaman it was 2s 6d.)

Then on 30 April Seine captured the French privateer schooner Perseverante. Perseverante was armed with one 12-pounder gun and four 4-pounders, and had a complement of 90 men, of whom 84 were on board at the time of her capture. She was from Guadeloupe and had been out 12 days, during which she had captured the English sloop Apollo, of Bermuda. Capturing Perseverante required a chase of three hours as she was remarkable fast sailing. She was three years old, newly coppered and fastened with "composition bolts"; the description was perhaps notice to the admiral of the station that the Royal Navy might consider buying her. (Note: The prize money for a petty officer was 16s 6d; for a seaman it was 4s 3d.)

On 27 May Seine's barge, under the command of Lieutenant Bland of the Marines, captured the recently constructed Spanish schooner Conception off Puerto Rico. Conception was armed with two 6-pounder guns and had a crew of 10 men. She had some nine passengers on board who resisted, but then escaped on shore. She was from Santa Maxta Martha and was carrying a cargo of log wood. Atkins captured nine prisoners whom he quickly landed as they appeared ill and he wished to avoid introducing sickness into Seine.

By coincidence, on 18 June, Bland, in Seine's barge, captured a second Conception, this one a felucca of two long 4-pounder guns and carrying a crew of 14 men. The Spanish resisted for three-quarters of an hour before surrendering. In the action they suffered five men wounded; the British had no casualties. The felucca was carrying cocoa and cochineal from Puerto Rico to Cadiz. On his short cruize with the barge, Bland also destroyed a Spanish sloop.

On 29 June Seine aided Unicorn, Comet, and Cossack in capturing the French brig Pierre Caesar off the coast of France. The Admiralty took Pierre Caesar into service as Tigress.

On 26 December 1807, Seine captured the French privateer lugger Sybille at 49°27′N 8°30′W. Sybille had a crew of 43 men and was pierced for 14 guns but had only one long gun on board, as well as some swivel guns and small arms. She was five days out of Morlaix but had taken no prizes.

On 26 October 1809, Seine, Captain Atkins, captured the French privateer brig Rodeur of sixteen 6-pounder guns (pierced for 20), and 121 men off Bordeaux. Rodeur was three days out of Bayonne, had not captured anything, but was on her way to cruise off the west coast of Ireland. She arrived at Plymouth on 29 October. (Note: Rôdeur, from Calais, had been commissioned in February 1807 under Captain Fourmentin. She made her first cruise under Fourmentin from February 1807 to May 1807. She made her second cruise under Jacques Sauvage of Boulogne from September 1808 to December 1809.)

On the night of 12 February 1810, Seine was in the Basque Roads, when a convoy of ten vessels sailed from the river Charente and three chasse-marées went aground on the reef off the Point de Chatelaillon between La Rochelle and Île d'Aix. Sir Joseph Sydney Yorke, of HMS Christian VII, then sent in three boats each from Christian VII and HMS Armide, plus two from Seine, to attack them. Nine French gunboats, each carrying a 12-pounder carronade and six swivel guns, and manned with sufficient men for 20 to 30 oars, fled from the British boats. The British, led by Lt. Gardiner Henry Guion, captured one gunboat, killing two of her crew and wounding three, including her commander; two gunboats grounded and could not be retrieved. The British then burnt the three chasse-marees that they had captured.

On 25 July 1810 the West Indiaman Starling, Coulson, master, was returning to London from Martinique and St Lucia when she encountered the French privateer Dame Ernouf, of 18 guns and 130 men, nine days into a cruise from Brest. Dame Ernouf captured Starling, but three days later, on 28 July, Seine recaptured Starling off Brest.

Seine was broken up in 1813.
