= Jean-Baptiste-François Bompart =

- Born: 1757; Lorient
- Died: 1842 (aged 84–85) Bagnols-sur-Cèze
- Allegiance: Kingdom of France; French First Republic
- Branch: French Navy
- Rank: Vice Admiral
- Commands: Embuscade, Expédition d'Irlande
- Conflicts: American Revolutionary War; French Revolutionary Wars; Action of 31 July 1793; Battle of Tory Island

Jean-Baptiste-François Bompart (French pronunciation: [ʒɑ̃ batist fʁɑ̃swa bɔ̃paʁ]; 1757 – 1842) was a French Navy officer and privateer. He was related to the noted Admiral Maximin de Bompart.

He took part in the American War of Independence as a young officer.

He later captained the Embuscade. She encountered and fought HMS Boston off New Jersey at the action of 31 July 1793.

Promoted to admiral, he commanded the Expédition d'Irlande and was later defeated at the Battle of Tory Island.

He retired in 1801 over political disputes.

== Sources ==
- Les Noms qui ont fait l'histoire de Bretagne, Coop Breizh et Institut culturel de Bretagne, 1997, notice de Paul Coat.
