= Richard Henry Nibbs =

English painter

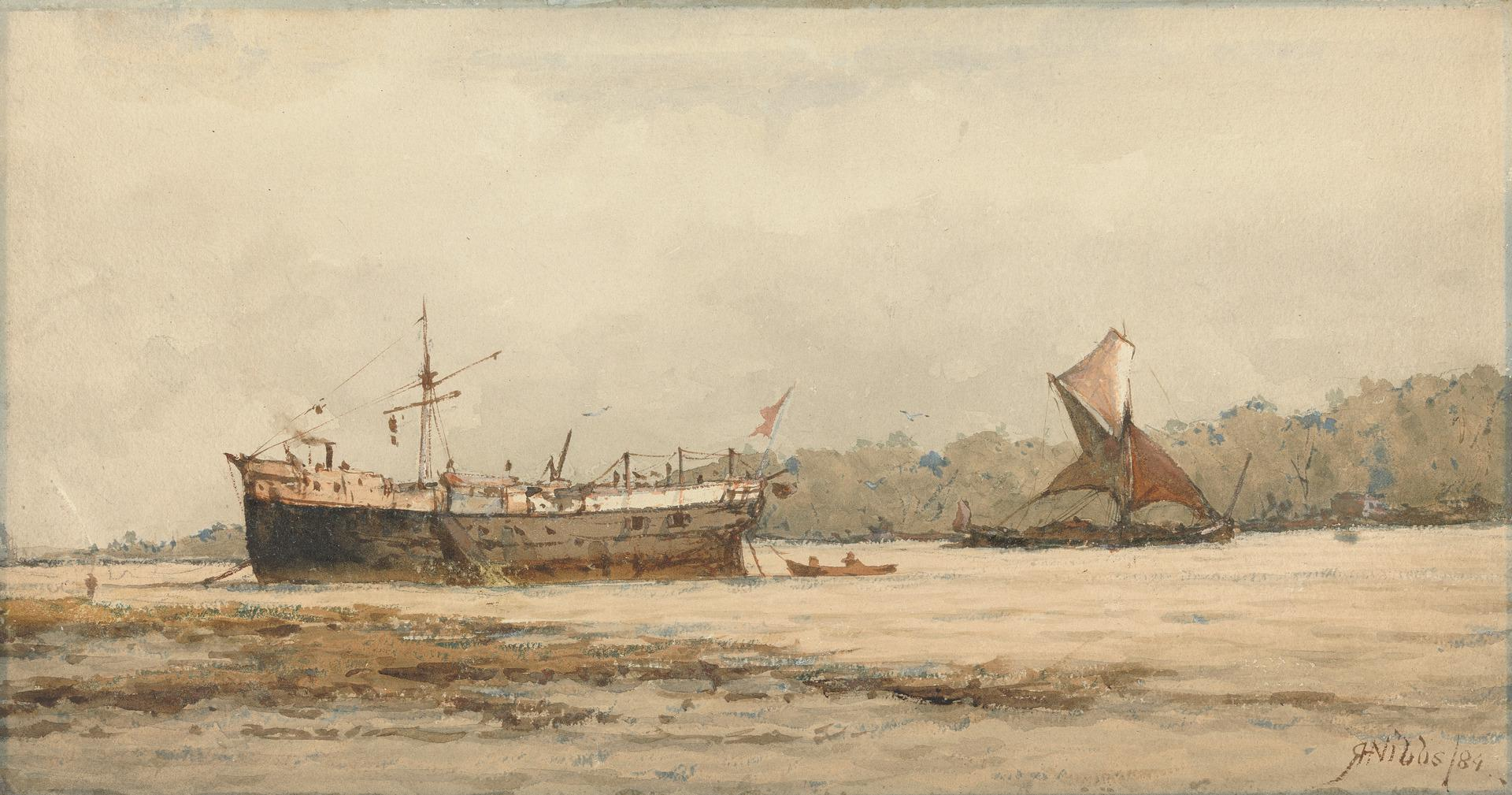
A Moored Barque and Barge in a River, watercolour, 1884, Yale Center for British Art

Richard Henry Nibbs (1816–1893) was an English painter and book illustrator who specialised in marine art.

Nibbs was born in Brighton, Sussex (now East Sussex), England and educated at a school in Worthing (run by the father of watercolourist Henry Tidey). He lived in Brighton throughout his life. Nibbs initially trained as a musician and became a professional cellist with the Theatre Royal orchestra. However, a lifelong love of art combined with a natural talent for detailed observation led him to become a self-taught painter - in both oils and watercolour - particularly of marine subjects. In 1840 a substantial inheritance allowed him to devote himself full-time to art.

His marine art depicts scenes mainly off the coast of his native Sussex, France and Holland - though he also drew buildings and landscapes. He exhibited regularly at the Royal Academy, the British Institution and the Royal Society of British Artists.

== Selected works ==
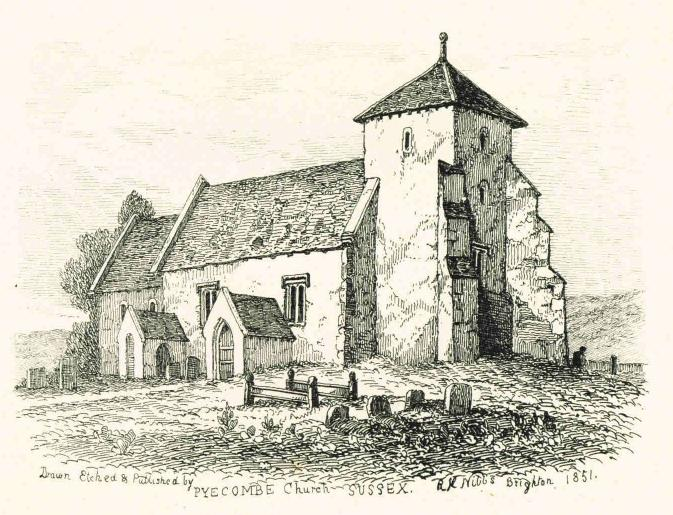
Church of the Transfiguration, Pyecombe, Sussex

Paintings:

- Low Water: Newhaven Harbour, Sussex .
- HMS Vengeance at Spithead (1851).
- Queen Victoria landing at the Chain Pier, Brighton (1843).
- Brighton promenade, 1850.
- Shipping on the Thames.
- Shoreham.
- Philadelphia Harbour.

Illustrated books:

- Lower, Mark Anthony. The Churches of Sussex: With Historical and Archaeological Descriptions (1872)
- Nibbs, R. H. Antiquities of Sussex (1872)
