= HMS Boston (1762) =

Frigate of the Royal Navy

- Boston

History

Great Britain
- Name: HMS Boston
- Ordered: 24 March 1761
- Builder: Robert Inwood, Rotherhithe
- Laid down: 5 May 1761
- Launched: 11 May 1762
- Completed: 16 July 1762 at Deptford Dockyard
- Commissioned: May 1762
- Fate: Taken to pieces at Plymouth, May 1811

General characteristics
- Class & type: Richmond-class fifth-rate frigate
- Tons burthen: 676 67/94 bm
- Length: 127 ft 5 in (38.84 m) (gundeck); 107 ft 8 in (32.82 m) (keel)
- Beam: 34 ft 4 1/2 in (10.478 m)
- Depth of hold: 12 ft 0 1/2 in (3.670 m)
- Sail plan: Full-rigged ship
- Complement: 210 officers and men
- Armament: Upperdeck: 26 × 12-pounder guns; QD: 4 × 6-pounder guns; Fc 2 × 6-pounder chase guns

HMS Boston was a 32-gun Richmond-class fifth-rate frigate of the Royal Navy. She was launched in 1762. She served during the American Revolutionary War and the French Revolutionary War, and was broken up in 1811.

On 16 April 1797, Boston was 18 leagues (87 km) north north east of Cape Finisterre when after a six-hour chase she captured the French privateer Enfant de la Patrie, of 16 guns and 130 men. Enfant de la Patrie was eight days out of Bordeaux but had not taken anything. The captain of the privateer was drunk, and so decided to resist, firing his guns, small arms, and running his vessel into Boston. His rashness resulted in five of his crew being killed, ten wounded, and he himself drowning.

Sometime shortly before 19 January, 1803 she had her bowsprit replaced at the Norfolk Navy Yard, Norfolk, Virginia.
