= Action of 22 October 1793 =

Minor naval engagement during the French Revolutionary Wars

- Part of the French Revolutionary Wars
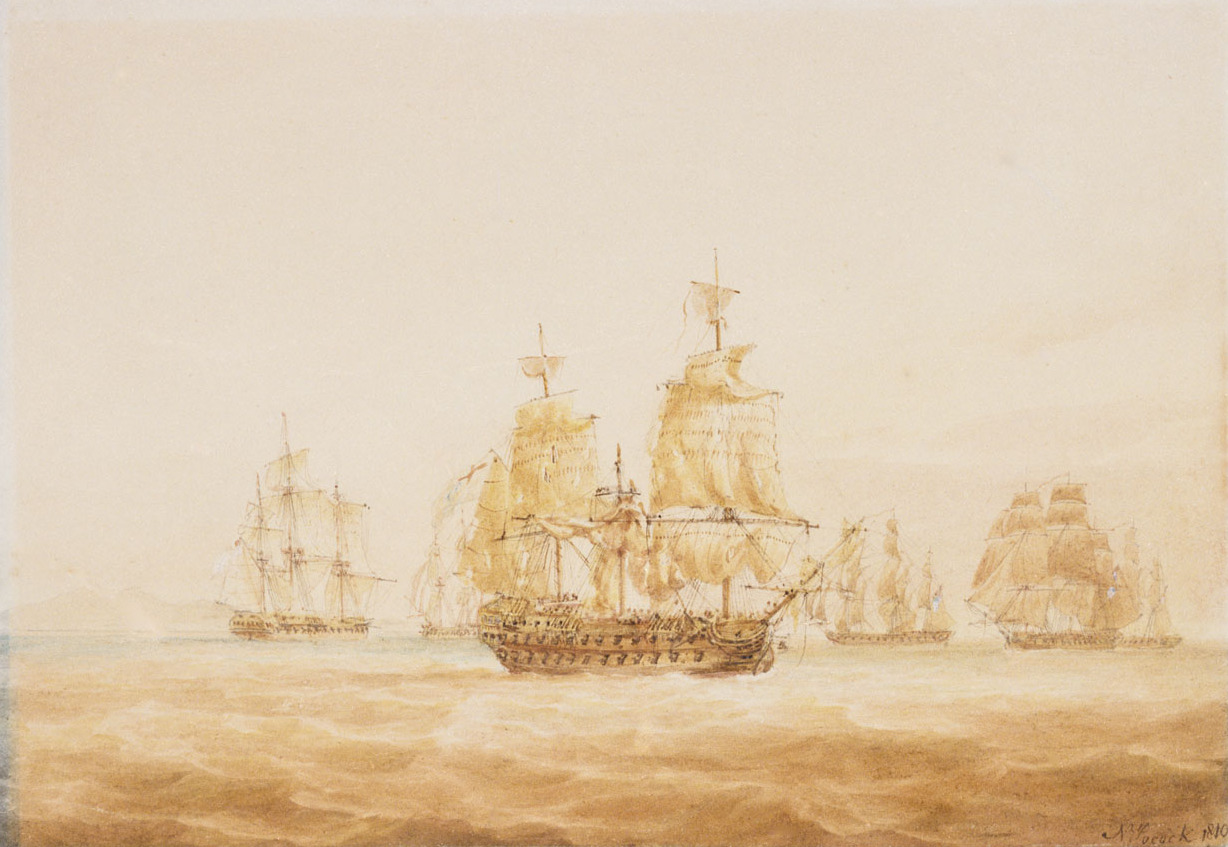
- Painting of the action by Nicholas Pocock
| Date | 22 October 1793 |
| Location | Off Sardinia, Mediterranean Sea |
| Result | Inconclusive |

Belligerents
| Great Britain | France |

Commanders and leaders
| Horatio Nelson | Jean-Baptiste Perrée |

Strength
| 1 ship of the line | 4 frigates 1 brig |

Casualties and losses
| 1 killed 6 wounded | 24 killed 50 wounded |

The action of 22 October 1793 was a minor naval engagement fought in the Mediterranean Sea during the War of the First Coalition, early in the French Revolutionary Wars. During the engagement a lone British Royal Navy ship of the line, the 64-gun HMS Agamemnon, attacked the French Navy large frigate Melpomène, part of a larger squadron, off the coast of Sardinia. Although Agamemnon chased Melpomène some distance through the night and inflicted significant damage, the French frigate was able to escape following the arrival of the rest of its squadron under Commodore Jean-Baptiste Perrée. The French ships later anchored in Corsican harbours to land reinforcements for the French garrison on the island, where the population was in open revolt.

The engagement is notable for being the first action of the war fought by Captain Horatio Nelson, then a junior captain in the Mediterranean Fleet. Nelson would go on to lead naval shore parties in the Invasion of Corsica the following year, during which the entire French squadron was captured or destroyed. He later achieved notable successes in a number of crucial battles during the war and is remembered as one of Britain's greatest military heroes.

== Background ==
The new French Republic had declared war on the Kingdom of Great Britain on 1 February 1793, following years of rising tension. The British immediately laid preparations for the deployment of a large fleet to the Mediterranean Sea, in order to enact a blockade on the French Mediterranean Fleet based at Toulon. The British Mediterranean fleet was dispatched in a series of divisions during the spring, led by Vice-Admiral Lord Hood, and numbered 21 ships of the line and associated frigates. Among this force was the 64-gun small ship of the line HMS Agamemnon, under the command of Captain Horatio Nelson. Hood's fleet entered the Mediterranean at the end of June 1793, and on arriving off Toulon found the French naval base in open revolt against the Jacobin National Convention. Hood negotiated the surrender of the port and the French fleet, landing substantial troops and stores to defend it from French Republican counterattack.

Hood was aware of the vulnerability of his position and sought a nearby safe harbour, settling on the island of Corsica. Corsica had been invaded and annexed by the French in 1768 and its inhabitants were still rebellious; shortly before Hood's arrival an attempt by the French to arrest the island's leader Pasquale Paoli had led to an uprising which had driven the French garrison into a three fortified towns on the northern coast. Hood sent a squadron under Commodore Robert Linzee to attempt to negotiate the surrender of these strategically important positions, with orders that if these overtures failed, Linzee was to attack the port of San Fiorenzo. The attack failed, and Linzee withdrew to Cagliari on the allied island of Sardinia. In early October, Agamemnon was sent to join Linzee for an operation against a French convoy anchored in the neutral port of Tunis; Nelson's crew was substantially under-strength at 345 sailors.

A number of French ships had been absent from Toulon when the uprising occurred and remained active at sea while Hood's forces occupied the city. For example, one such squadron was under the command of Commodore Jean-Baptiste Perrée, comprising 40-gun frigates Melpomène, under Lieutenant Gay, and Minerve, under Zacharie Allemand, the 36-gun frigate Fortunée, under Désiré Maistral, the 28-gun frigate Mignonne (Note: Troude does not list Mignonne in the division.) and the 18-gun brig Flèche, under Joseph Allemand. (Note: James says the 14-gun brig-sloop Hazard.) In October these ships had sailed to Tunis with a larger squadron before detaching on a mission to land reinforcements for the garrison on Corsica.

== Battle ==
In the early hours of 22 October, as Agamemnon sailed southwards down the Sardinian coast, sails were sighted 3 nautical miles (5.6 km) leeward. At 02:00 the strange ships fired rocket signals and tacked eastwards away from the British ship. Nelson closed with the squadron under the assumption that they may be from the allied navies of Naples or Sardinia. At 04:00 he attempted to hail the rearmost ship, a large frigate, but received no answer. Nelson then fired a single shot ahead of the ship, which pulled away to windward, confirming that it was an enemy vessel. All sails were raised on Agamemnon in pursuit, the rest of the French squadron trailing behind the French and British front-runners.

The leading ship was the 40-gun frigate Melpomène, and propelled by a fresh breeze she hoisted the French Tricolour at dawn and opened fire with stern-chaser guns, cannon situated in the stern to fire on a pursuer. Periodically the frigate gained enough distance to turn and fire a broadside at the British ship of the line, to which Nelson could only respond with a handful of his forward guns. The rest of the French squadron had been left behind in the night, but by 09:00 the battling ships had been becalmed and the pursuit squadron came into sight once more. Melpomène, badly damaged by the British fire, issued flag signals to the new arrivals, and Nelson was unable to prevent the frigate rejoining its companions.

Agamemnon had suffered severe damage to its rigging and sails from the French fire, and should the French have attempted a united attack, Nelson would have had difficulty manoeuvering in the battle. Nelson called together his officers and held a council of war to decide whether the action should be renewed in this state or whether Agamemnon should withdraw. This consultation was unusual in the Royal Navy, but provided Nelson with support from his crew should he be questioned on the point when he returned to the fleet. The council decided to pause and allow the crew to eat a meal before reengaging the French, but the conclusion was moot as Perrée also declined to renew the action. By 12:00 repairs on Melpomène were sufficient to allow the French to withdraw. Losses on Agamemnon were one sailor killed and six wounded, much lower than reported casualties of 24 killed and 50 wounded on Melpomène.

Nelson himself later estimated that the combined French force mustered 170 guns and 1,600 sailors and could easily have overwhelmed his disabled ship had they counterattacked. He wrote that "Had they [the French frigates] been English, a 64 could never have got [away] from them." The engagement has been cited as typifying naval tactics of the period; the Royal Navy, as the more aggressive service, preferred the weather gage, from which they could bear down on an enemy ship in a frontal attack. The French, trained in defensive tactics, took the leeward position that allowed them the opportunity of escape and the ability to target the attacker as they closed. The French tactics allowed them to direct their fire against the attacker's masts, sails and rigging from long range, as with the Agamemnon, disabling the enemy and preventing them from pressing their attack. However, the British preferred point-blank range, around 400 yards (370 m), and targeted the hull and crew of the enemy ship, seeking to batter it into surrender.

== Aftermath ==
Following the engagement, Nelson joined with Linzee on 24 October and completed the ultimately unsuccessful negotiations at Tunis. Perrée was able to reach Corsica, landing reinforcements for the garrison and anchoring his frigates at San Fiorenzo and Calvi. The bolstered French forces on the island were able to conduct limited offenses around Bastia, recapturing the town of Farinole from the Corsican irregulars. Corsican irregular forces had held the bay at San Fiorenzo and might have opposed the French landings, but Linzee had recently disarmed the Corsican-manned Torra di Mortella, which was recaptured. In December 1793 the French army recaptured Toulon and Hood was forced to withdraw. An invasion of Corsica was planned in 1794, with successful sieges at San Fiorenzo in February, Bastia in April and Calvi in July–August. During these operations, during which Nelson led the naval detachments ashore and lost an eye to cannon-fire at Calvi, all of Perrée's squadron, except Hazard, was captured or destroyed.

Nelson remained with the Mediterranean Fleet for several years; he fought in Agamemnon at the Battle of Genoa in 1795, was instrumental in the defeat of the Spanish fleet at the Battle of Cape St Vincent in 1797, and in 1798 led the British fleet which destroyed the French Mediterranean Fleet at the Battle of the Nile. In 1800, during the siege of Malta, he encountered Perrée again at the Battle of the Malta Convoy, in which Perrée was killed in action and his ship captured by Nelson. Nelson himself was killed in action five years later at the Battle of Trafalgar, in which a combined French and Spanish fleet was destroyed. He is remembered as one of Britain's greatest and most successful naval commanders.
