= Abdul Hamid Kishk =

Egyptian Islamic scholar (1933-1996)

Shaykh Abd Al-Hamid Kishk عبد الحميد كشك
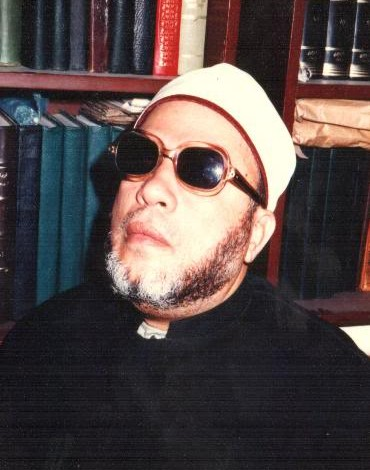
- Kishk in 1986
- Born: ʿAbd al-Hamid ʿAbd al-ʿAziz Muhammad Kishk; 10 March 1933; Shubra Khit, Kingdom of Egypt
- Died: 6 December 1996 (aged 63); Cairo, Egypt
- Education: Al-Azhar University

Abdul Hamid Kishk (Note: Arabic: عبد الحميد كشك) (10 March 1933 – 6 December 1996) was an Egyptian Islamic preacher and scholar. A graduate of the Al-Azhar University in Cairo, he was also a prominent activist and writer in Egypt as well as the Arab world known for his humour, popular sermons, religious books and for his outspoken stance against injustice and oppression in the world.

== Biography ==
Abdul Hamid Kishk was born in 1933 in Shubra Khit, a small village near Alexandria, Egypt. His father died before he reached schooling age. He joined one of the schools of Azhar and by the age of 8 he had memorized the Quran. It was at this time that he was inflicted by an illness which took his sight. However, rather than demoralize him, the loss of his sight encouraged him to learn more and persevere further. He graduated as a scholar from the faculty of Usoul al Din in Azhar and was appointed as an Imam, giving khutbas throughout Egypt.

Around 1964 he took up the minbar of 'Ain al-Hayat mosque in Cairo as his platform. A vocal critic of the Egyptian government, he was imprisoned in 1965 for two and half years. "The peak of his fame" is said to have been "between 1967 and early 1980s," when crowds of 10,000 would regularly attend his often "hilarious" Friday sermons at a mosque in the Kobry Al Koba district in Cairo. A French scholar noted:

In the last years of the Sadat's presidency, it was impossible to walk the streets of Cairo without hearing [Kishk's] stentorian voice. Climb into a collective service-taxi and the driver is listening to one of Sheikh Kishk's recorded sermons... They listen to Kishk in Cairo, in Casablanca, and in the North African district of Marseilles. A Saudi-funded magazine has dubbed him 'the star of Islamic preaching'... none commands his incomparable vocal cords, his panoramic Muslim culture, his phenomenal capacity for improvisation, and his acerbic humour in criticizing infidel regimes, military dictatorship, the peace treaty with Israel, or the complicity of al-Azhar... So great was his fame that the Ministry of Waqf had to build several annexes to the mosque to accommodate the Friday crowds. In 1981, however, even these were insufficient to shelter the approximately 10,000 people who regularly attended.

Kishk's audience grew across the Arab world with the distribution of over 2,000 of his sermons in audio cassettes.

He was arrested again in 1981 shortly before Sadat's assassination, but was released by Egyptian President Hosni Mubarak in 1982 under the condition that he end his career as a public activist. His cassette tapes continued to be widely available thereafter, but the mosque in Cairo where he preached was converted into a public health center.

== Beliefs and political activities ==
As a preacher at 'Ain al-Hayat mosque he condemned the social conditions in Egypt and the suppression of the Islamic Movement. This did not stop him from having distinctly spiritual approach to life, something which his speeches reflect. He became a dissident under the tenure and government of Gamal Abdel Nasser, refusing to sanction the government's execution of Sayyid Qutb as well as assert compatibility between Islam and socialism. He was boycotted by the official media under the Anwar Sadat regime (1970–1981), but cassette tapes of his sermons were widely distributed all over Egypt and the Arab world. Kishk held political views opposed to the modern bureaucratic state, and emphasized personal and private piety in his speeches.

=== Marriage law ===
Kishk attacked Egyptian secularists for the "abolition" of "personal statute" (al-ahwal al-shakhsiyya). This referred to the passing of a law (44/1979) on spousal relations which required men to inform their wives if they had married another woman. "Under the new law, if the first wife objected, she could immediately obtain a divorce and would preserve the right to live in the husband's home until their children attained the age of maturity. This law was drafted by the office of the Ministry of Social Affairs and a commission of Al-Azhar scholars, and aroused the fury" of Kishk and other sheikhs, who held that it "contravened the shari'a".

=== Greater jihad ===
According to Kishk, the greater jihad is a continuous struggle aimed at subduing one’s baser nature and attuning oneself to Allah’s moral standards. It is the basis for personal moral development, creating pious and philanthropic activism, promoting justice and prosperity in society, while combating ignorance, injustice and oppression. As a result of this greater jihad, says Kishk, Islam "heals those societies which follows its guidance and are built on consciences which have been awakened and hearts which have been illuminated by the light of belief."

=== Naguib Mahfouz ===
Kishk wrote "Our Response to Children of the Alley", attacking the controversial novel of Egyptian author Naguib Mahfouz for "violating Muslim sacred belief" and "supplanting monotheism with communism and scientific materialism". Mahfouz had won the 1988 Nobel Prize for Literature, (the only Arab ever to be awarded that Prize) but was widely reviled by many revivalist preachers (such as Omar Abdel-Rahman), for one of his "best known works", (Children of Gebelawi).

== Books ==
Outside his popularity due to his oratory skills he was also the author of nearly 30 books in Islamic cultures.
