= French ship Mignonne =

Many ships of the French Navy have been named Mignonne including :

- Mignonne launched in 1673 and struck in 1694
- Mignonne acquired in 1767 and captured in 1794 becoming HMS Mignonne
