= Cyprien Renaudin =

French Navy officer

Mathieu-Cyprien Renaudin (French pronunciation: [matjø sipʁijɛ̃ ʁənodɛ̃]; 27 March 1757, Saint-Denis-d'Oléron – 14 February 1836, Saint-Denis d'Oléron) was a French Navy officer. He was cousin to Jean François Renaudin.

== Career ==
Renaudin started sailing as a seaman in 1781 before rising to Ensign on the 20-gun corvette Perdrix.

On 13 May 1793, he was appointed first officer to the frigate Andromaque, under Jean François Renaudin, on which he sustained a fight against a ship of the line and four Spanish frigates.

On 26 February 1794, Renaudin was appointed first officer on the 74-gun Vengeur du Peuple, still under his cousin. He took part in the Glorious First of June, survived the sinking of Vengeur and was taken prisoner by the British. His report states that he refused to follow Captain Renaudin when he abandoned his ship, and stayed behind to attempt and rescue the wounded of Vengeur.

In 1800, Renaudin was Captain, and was Perrée's flag officer on Généreux at the Battle of the Malta Convoy. There, he was captured with the surrender of Généreux. He was subsequently honourably acquitted during the automatic court-martial for the loss of his ship.

A street of Saint Denis d'Oléron was named in his honour.

== Notes and references ==
=== Bibliography ===
- Bodiou, Jean (2010). Un marin d'infortune: Mathieu-Cyprien Renaudin héros méconnu du Vengeur (in French). Le Croît Vif. ISBN 978-2-36199-001-5. Archived from the original on 2016-03-04.
- Diaz de Soria, Ollivier-Zabulon (1954). Le Marseillois, devenu plus tard le Vengeur du peuple (in French). F. Robert et fils.
- Levot, Prosper (1866). Les gloires maritimes de la France: notices biographiques sur les plus célèbres marins (in French). Bertrand.
- Troude, Onésime-Joachim (1867). Batailles navales de la France (in French). Vol. 3. Challamel ainé.
- Fonds Marine. Campagnes (opérations; divisions et stations navales; missions diverses). Inventaire de la sous-série Marine BB4. Tome premier : BB4 1 à 482 (1790–1826)
