= Désiré-Marie Maistral =

French Navy officer (1764–1842)

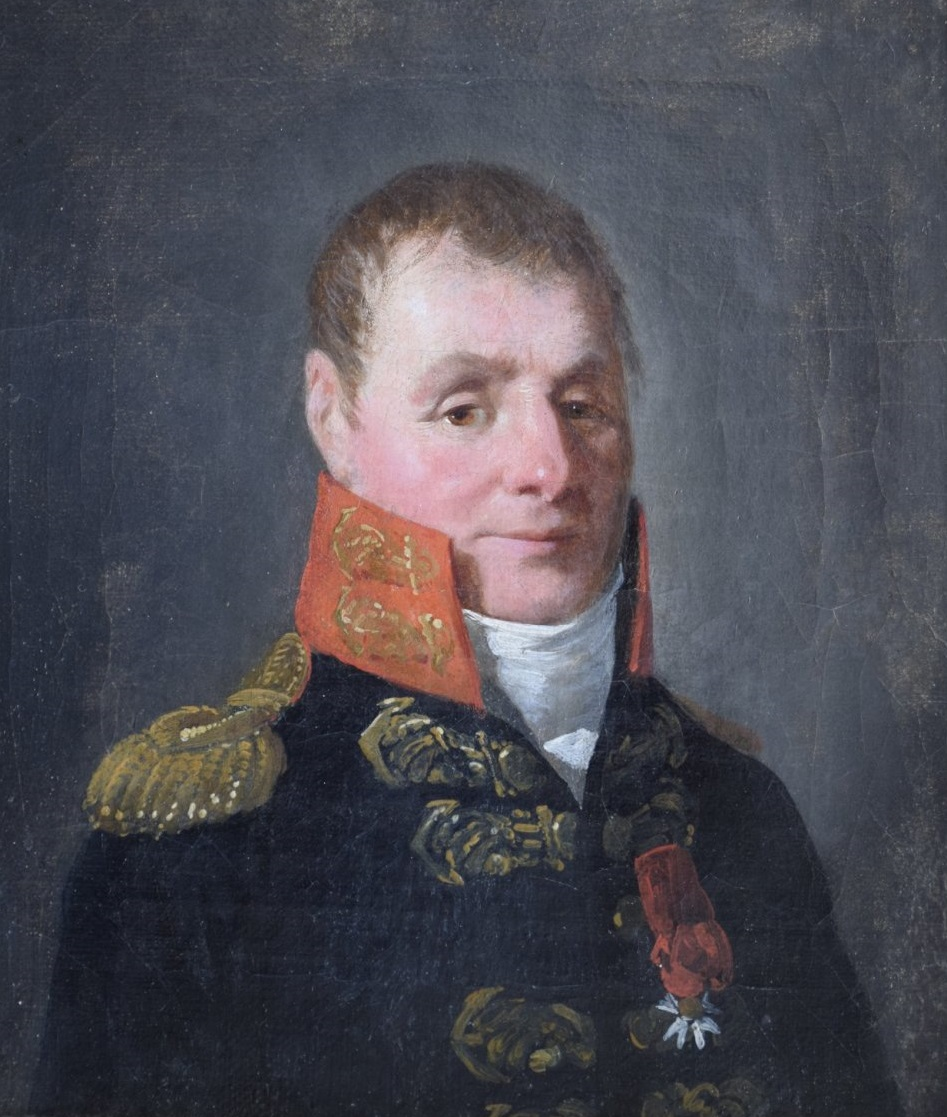
- Born: 25 October 1764; Quimper, France
- Died: 17 August 1842 (aged 77); Brest, France
- Relatives: Esprit-Tranquille Maistral
- Military career
- Branch: French Navy
- Rank: Captain
- Conflicts: American Revolutionary War; French Revolutionary Wars

Désiré-Marie Maistral (French pronunciation: [deziʁe maʁi mestʁal]; 25 October 1764 in Quimper — 17 August 1842 in Brest) was a French Navy officer. He took part in the War of American Independence and in the French Revolutionary Wars.

== Career ==
Désiré-Marie Maistral was born to François Louis Maistral, a physician, and to his wife Françoise Yvonne Bouisse. He was the brother of Esprit-Tranquille Maistral. Maistral joined the Navy as a boy on 9 June 1776 Licorne.

He took part in the American Revolutionary War, serving on the 74-gun Diadème in the squadron under Admiral d'Estaing. In 1782, he was appointed to the 64-gun Réfléchi.

On 30 September 1782, Maistral was promoted to Lieutenant de frégate and appointed to the 64-gun Provence.

On 1 January 1792, he was promoted to Lieutenant and given command of the frigate Fortunée. He took part in the action of 22 October 1793, and scuttled his ship by fire to prevent her from falling to the British at the end of the Siege of Bastia.

Taken prisoner by the British, Maistral was promoted to Commander on 21 March 1796, while in captivity. After he was freed, he served as first officer on Républicain and on Hoche, taking part in the Expédition d'Irlande. Maistral was wounded when Hoche was captured by a British division at the Battle of Tory Island, and taken prisoner again. He was released on parole on 24 September 1799, and promoted to Captain 2nd Class on 14 December 1799, to take command of Mont Blanc.

In the following years, Maistral captained Terrible, Consolante, Uranie and Hermione. He retired in 1817.
