= Battle of Shubra Khit =

1798 battle of the French invasion of Egypt and Syria

- Part of the French invasion of Egypt and Syria
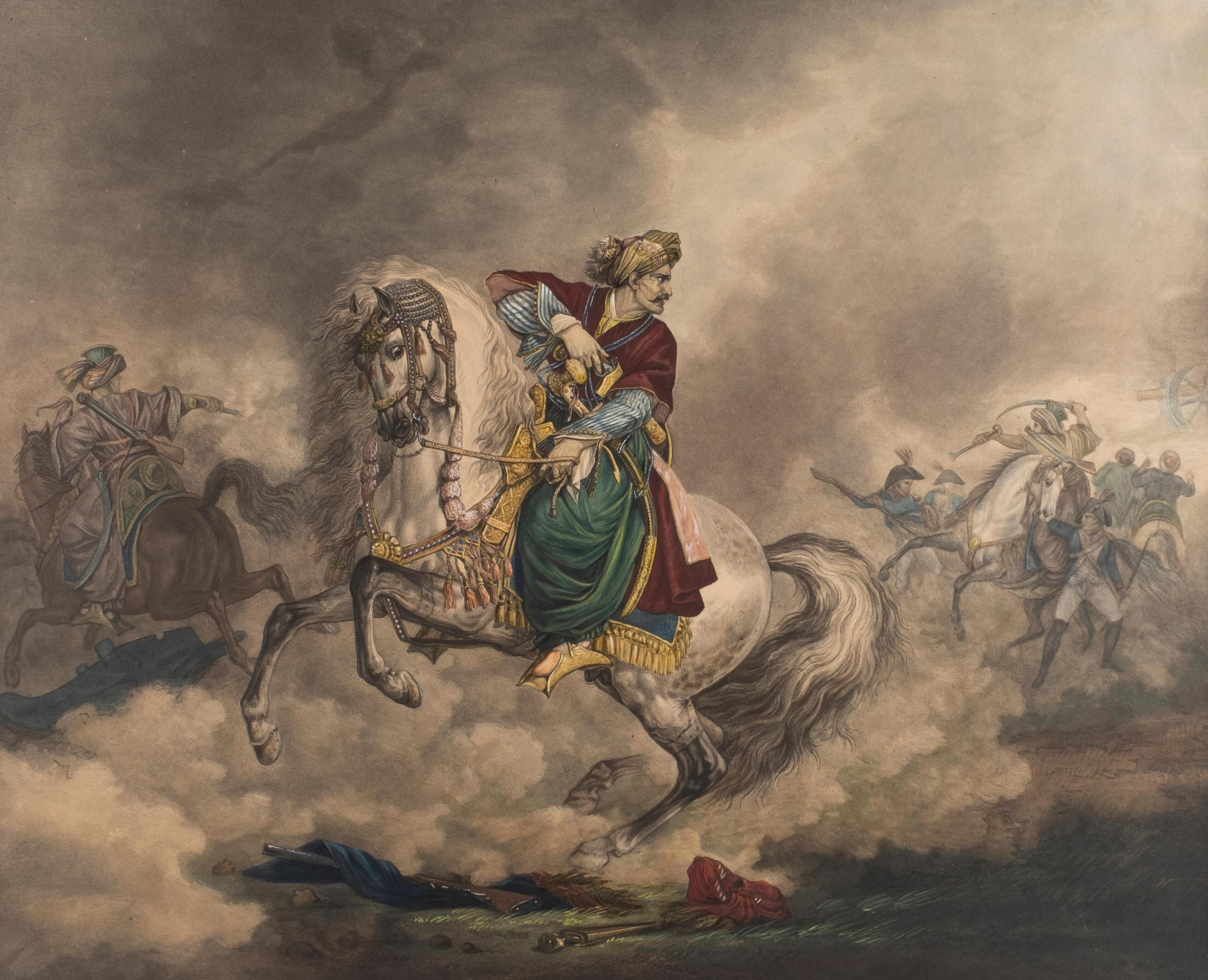
- Mamluk cavalry fighting French troops during the invasion; similar scenes occurred during the battle
Date	13 July 1798
Location	Shubra Khit, Ottoman Egypt 31°1′39″N 30°42′46″E
Result	French victory

Belligerents
France	Ottoman Empire

Commanders and leaders
Napoleon; Jean-Baptiste Perrée	Murad Bey; Nicola the Greek (Nile Flotilla)

Strength
23,000; 3 gunboats 1 xebec 1 galley 20 smaller vessels (7 ships in battle)	16,000; 7 gunboats

Casualties and losses
420–520 killed or wounded 3 vessels lost	700–800 killed or wounded 1 gunboat destroyed 6 gunboats scuttled

The Battle of Shubra Khit (also known as the Battle of Chobrakit or the Battle of Chebreïss) was the second major engagement of the French invasion of Egypt and Syria and took place on 13 July 1798. On their march to Cairo, the French army encountered an Ottoman army consisting of Mamluk cavalry and drafted Fellahins under Murad Bey. Napoleon lined his forces up into infantry squares, a tactic which helped repel the Mamluk cavalry, largely due to their inability to penetrate them without suffering severe casualties. A naval battle also occurred, with an Ottoman flotilla being repelled by a French flotilla.

== Background ==
French expeditionary forces under the command of Napoleon Bonaparte landed in Egypt near Alexandria on 1 July of the same year, withstanding a vicious charge by local Bedouins during the landing and sustaining many casualties in the process. The French troops then marched on and assaulted Alexandria and captured it after its Wali, Koraim Pasha, refused to surrender. Koraim Pasha had previously sent several urgent missives to Cairo informing the Mameluke leadership of the large landing of French troops nearby.

After capturing Alexandria, Napoleon sent a column eastwards to capture Rosetta, this column would be commanded by Charles Dugua. The object being to capture the port to the western Nile river, where a French composite flotilla of Xebecs and various other riverine vessels, would be requisitioned to ferry supplies and accoutrements down the Nile all the way to Cairo, this flotilla would be under command of Jean-Baptiste Perrée, sailing concurrently with Dugua's column. Dugua had succeeded in pacifying Rosetta and the delta, and purchased a large amount of rice, lentils and other provisions for the advance down to Cairo.

=== Arrival at Damanhur; combat at Damanhur ===
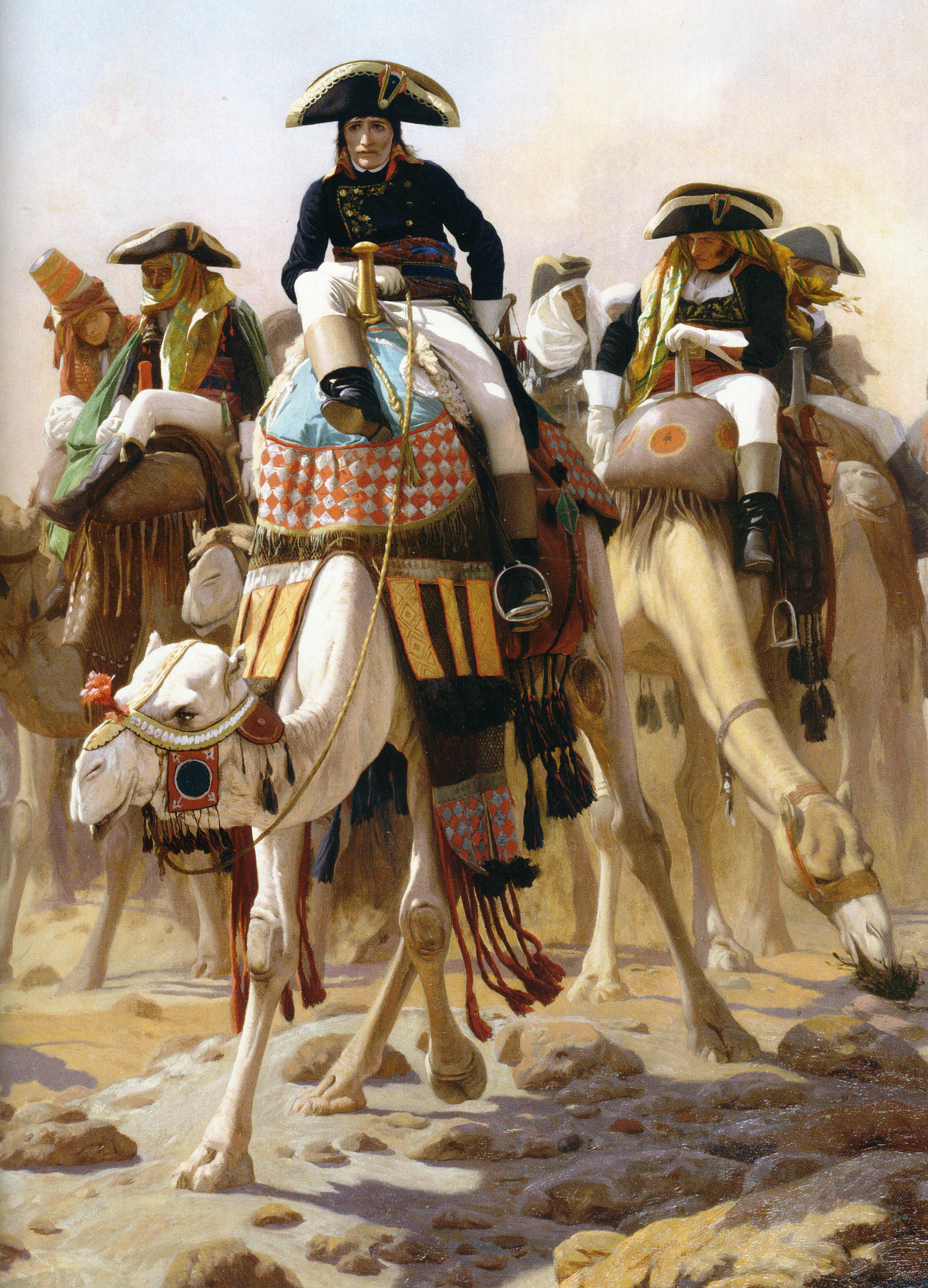
Napoleon and his staff officers marching across the Egyptian desert on camels

The main column of the French army was hurriedly marched out of Alexandria after a rest of less than two days, ordered by Napoleon to march some 50 miles across mostly barren terrain, aiming for Ramaniyah, a village on the banks of the Nile, with the help of Egyptian guides, who had exaggerated the status of Damanhur, which was to be the main waypoint on which the army could resupply itself on local provisions in its march for the west bank of the Nile near Ramaniya. Napoleon urged his army quickly before a flooding of the Nile could complicate and slow his progress. This force marched 40 miles in 4 days to Damanhur, with the initial column of Desaix arriving on July 7, and Reynier's column, mainly comprising troops from the Army of the Rhine, lagged behind and fared far worse during this march; Napoleon having not gained their trust. During the stay in Damanhur a small contingent of Mamlukes made an attack on Desaix' division, but was routed with 4 casualties sustained among the French. While there, Napoleon resided in the local Sheikh's mansion and made his headquarters there. During his stay, a small group of riders attacked his headquarters, and Napoleon ordered Croisier and a few guides to drive them back, and Croisier made a half-spirited attempt with some 15 guides to drive away the attackers. After a brief tangle, the Arabs rode away without a loss, to Napoleon's fury.

The harrowing march of the main columns for Ramaniyah had cost the expedition hundreds of troops, including General Mireur who was assassinated by Bedouins near the camp. After crossing through Damanhur and acquiring much needed provisions and precious water, the column resumed its march for Ramaniyah, where it was held up by the belated arrival of the riverine column of Dugua and Perrée; the latter taking six days to reach Rosetta instead of the originally projected 3 days long march due to rising tides in the Nile delta.

During the French convergence for Ramaniyah, one of the leading Mamelukes controlling Egypt, Murad Bey, gathered an intermediately sized army, comprising mostly Mamelukes, and marched to intercept the French expedition. The nominal Ottoman governor of Egypt, Abu Bakr Pasha, summoned a divan in Cairo. The real power in Egypt, however, lie with the two Mameluke beys Murad Bey and Ibrahim Bey, and their plan was adopted. Murad was to take a smaller force to intercept the French on their march to Cairo, while Ibrahim Bey was to muster a large army outside of Cairo, around the village of Bulaq. Murad had been purportedly dismissive of the French invasion, being sure that the barren terrain and lack of provisions and water would wreak havoc among the ranks of the invaders, and his army would only deliver the coup de grace.

After the combined French forces rested for less than 48 hours in Damanhur, the march for Ramaniya resumed on the nights of 9 and 10 July, this time the march being far less foreboding. The head elements arrived on the banks of the Nile on 10 July (22 Messidor), with much gallivanting and celebration taking place among the troops. A day later, Dugua's column finally arrived; only that it was unaccompanied by the flotilla. Napoleon was furious, and he inquired to Dugua on the matter of the flotilla. Dugua informed him that he disobeyed the order to accompany the laggard flotilla and pressed forward on to Ramaniyah to make the rendezvous in time. Perrée's flotilla was encountering many problems navigating the Nile; which was currently at its lowest levels, with many vessels running aground. The flotilla at the time numbered approximately 65 ships; of which, 25 were armed. The flotilla would arrive a day after Dugua's column had completed the rendezvous at Ramaniyah.

=== Preparations ===
Napoleon had learned from his scouts and guides that a Mameluke army under command of Murad bey was approaching, and began a general review of the army. He addressed his army and informed them of the approaching battle. The speech was received with mixed reaction; Napoleon had attempted especially to rally the courage of the soldiers of the Army of the Rhine, who had not served under him before, whereas he could count the trust and discipline of the rest of the army, consisting of units from his previous command; the Army of Italy.

The French army set to preparing itself ahead of the incoming battle. Musketry and cannons were cleaned, polished and tested, uniforms were washed, and soldiers performed drills as necessary, and the officers distributed Napoleon's address to the men, with Napoleon himself going out of his way to address smaller groups of soldiers, and pacifying the malcontents of his army, including many of his officers who had openly discussed the incredulity of his plan and what had seemed to be a suicidal march across a barren desert.

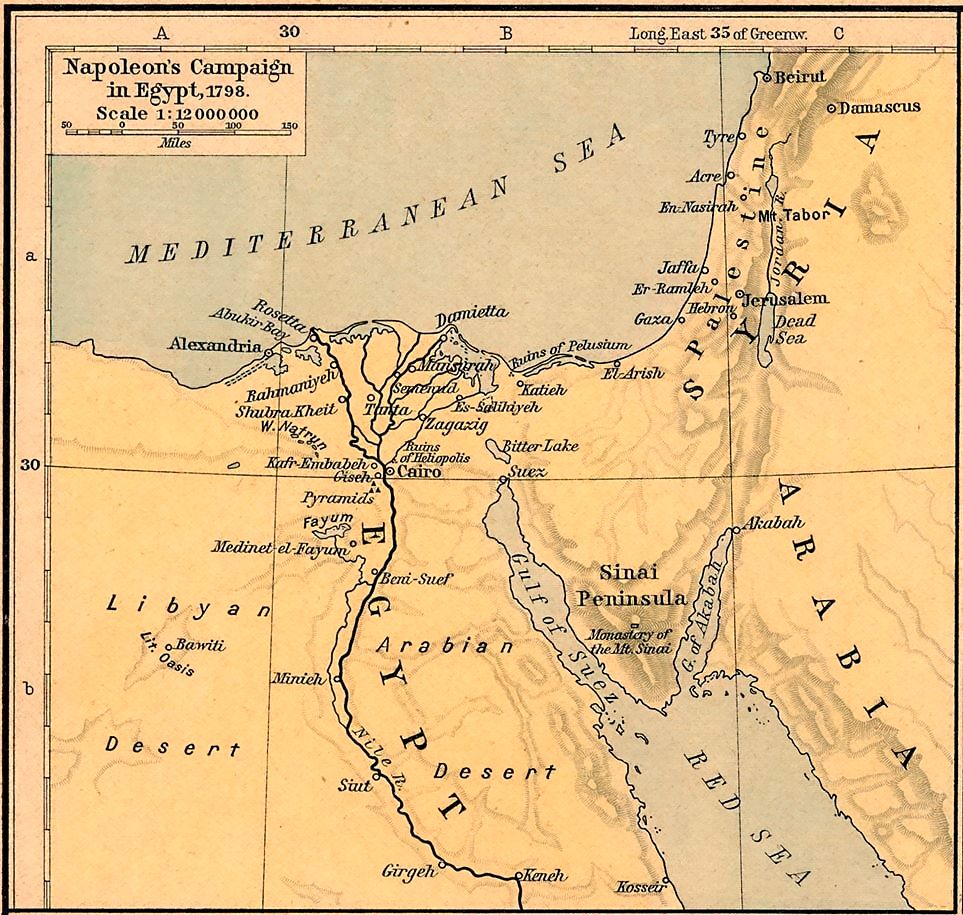
Map of the French invasion in 1798

Murad Bey and his army, numbering 3,000 Mameluke horse and 2,000 of their squires, later reinforced by local Mameluke chieftains and an infantry force that brought up their number to approximately 20,000, were in approach of the French, Murad stopped his army near the village of Shubra Khit, intending to make a stand there. Napoleon learned of this and ordered the army to begin advancing along the Nile, with Desaix' division leading the way, and the twenty five armed vessels of the flotilla shadowing the march. The army and flotilla covered the nine miles from Ramaniyah to Shubra Khit under the cover of darkness, arriving there in the evening of July 12. Napoleon wrote that his army consisted of 20,000-23,000 troops.

On the next day, after a few hours of sleep, Napoleon roused the French army at sunrise, and the two armies were in battle order before each other. The Mameluke army exhibited a rare scene of local solidarity in the politically volatile climate of Egypt, with many local Mameluke chieftains, Beys and some Bedouin chieftains joining Murad's army; a contingent of infantry and thousands of squires were behind the Mameluke cavalry in Shubra Khit.

== Battle ==
=== Land battle ===
The Mameluke line was contagious and extended from the west bank of the Nile out to the desert, making a slight circle around the flank of the French army; which was arrayed in divisional oblongs along the bank. The sight of the Mamelukes presented a dazzling spectacle to the French, Napoleon later remembered "how the sun touched their helmets and coats of mail, making their fine line glimmer in all its brilliance." Another observer, cavalry officer Desvernois, wrote;

It was a magnificent sight. In the distance, the desert beneath the blue sky, before us these beautiful Arab steeds, sumptuously harnessed, snorting, neighing, prancing lightly and gracefully beneath their martial riders, who were covered with dazzling arms inlaid with gold and jewels. They were clad in varied brilliantly-colored costumes, some wearing turbans bedecked with egret feathers, others wearing golden helmets, armed with sabers, lances, maces, spears, rifles, axes and daggers, each with three double-barreled pistols, two attached by cord to the twin pommels of their saddle, the other tucked into a belt on the left side of their stomach.

Napoleon and the French knew nothing of what to expect from the Mamelukes or their tactics. The Mamelukes had maintained a formidable and fearsome reputation in Europe, particularly in France, for hundreds of years, owing to the crushing defeat they had inflicted on St. Louis' crusade during the thirteenth century. Napoleon ordered his divisions to form up their giant divisional oblong formations; this time six ranks deep instead of the usual three as a precaution against unforeseen Mameluke tactics. The rectangles had a small group of cavalry and baggage in the center, with artillery placed at each corner. These oblongs were 300 yards wide at the front and 50 yards on the sides, with cannons posted at the corners, commanding 180 degree firing arcs.

For about the first three hours, the Mamelukes circled the rectangles, looking for a place to attack. During what seemed to be an unending suspense after the armies had formed up, tensions had grown high among the French ranks. At the same time, the French observed groups of Mamelukes galloping along the lines, encouraging the men. At this juncture, some disorganized and disordered groups of Mamelukes emerged from the ranks and began charging the French squares. These horsemen pulled up to the French ranks, some charging, while others searched in vain for any opening in the French ranks. They were picked off by French sharpshooters as they galloped through the French army, before finally beating a sullen retreat from among the French formations back to their line.

Soon afterwards, the sound of cannons booming in the distance was heard; Perrée's flotilla had in fact overshot the French army and sailed onwards, where it was ambushed by Murad Bey's armed flotilla along with some concealed batteries on the river banks. Napoleon, who was in a deadlock with the Mameluke army, could do nothing to aid the flotilla's predicament, while the Mameluke charges intensified in ferocity and number. Napoleon had observed, with a measure of admiration;

The Mamelukes displayed all their skill and courage. They were at one with their horses, which appeared to sense their every wish. . . having fired their six weapons they would outflank the line of sharpshooters and pass between the squares with marvelous dexterity.

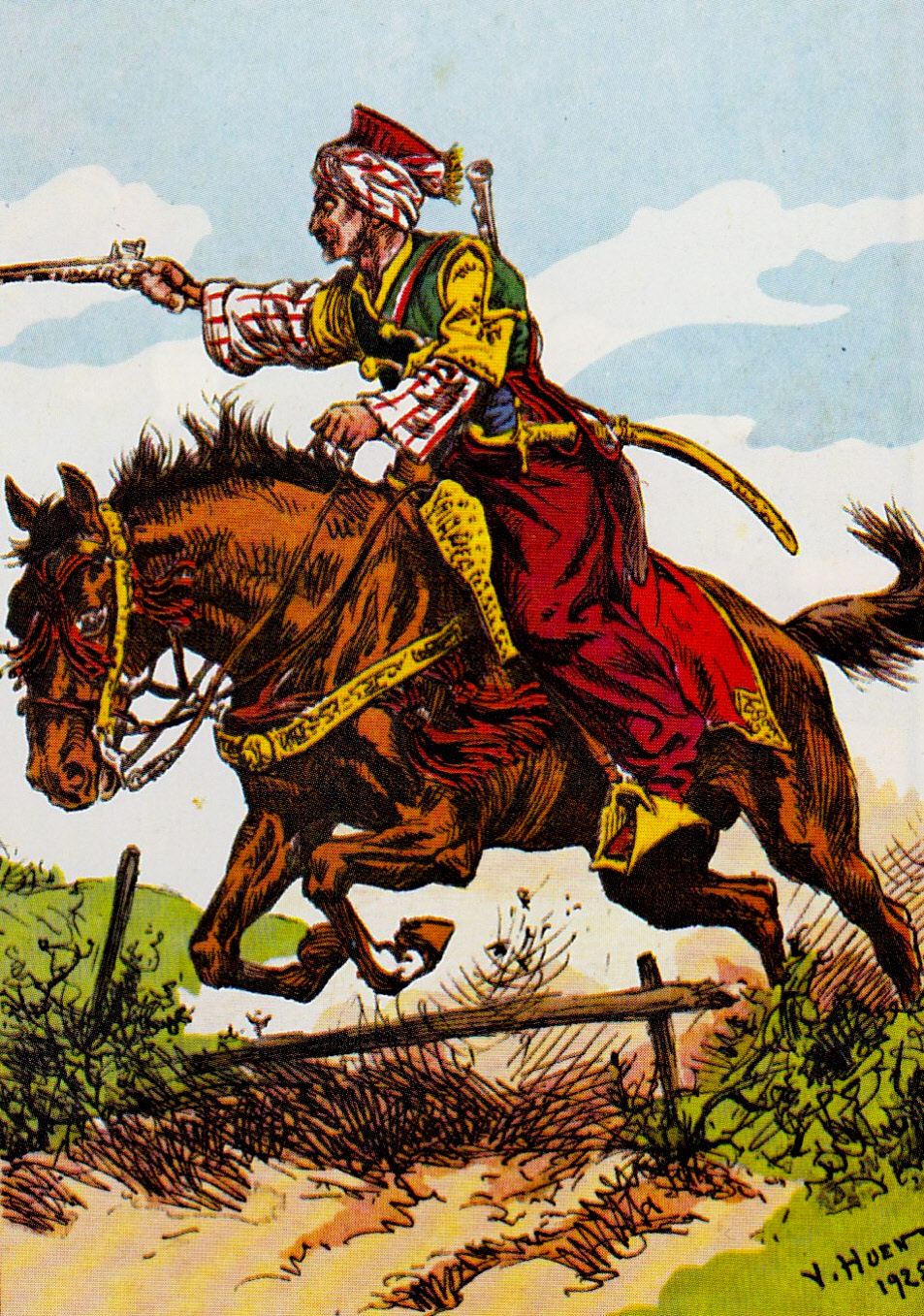
A Syrian mameluke in 1799; Egyptian mamelukes in 1798 dressed in a similar manner

Napoleon observed the Mamluke Beys conferring at the head of the army, and soon afterwards Murad Bey's army finally made a grand, concerted charge at the French army. This charge was repulsed by concentrated grapeshot volleys from cannons and several volleys of musketry, a contingent of Mamluks galloped between the squares of Dugua and Reynier, hoping to strike from their rear, but as Napoleon observed;

It was noticed that seven commanders, with detachments of selected warriors who served as their guard, gathered at the central point, on a hill; these were the beys who held the council. In an instant, this fine cavalry, led by seven beys, set off at a gallop and penetrated the gap between the square of General Reynier and the square of General Dugua, where the commander-in-chief was, no doubt expecting to find them open from the rear and hit them in the back. Buckshot and rifle fire from the front of the square, immediately then from the flanks and, finally, from the rear, killed and wounded many of them. Several brave men who rushed to the square from the rear died at bayonets. But when Murad Bey noticed that the fire from the rear was as strong as from the front, he hastily withdrew...

and the Mamelukes retreated, leaving some 60 dead and wounded among the French squares. The Mamelukes then reformed and attempted a small charge on the French reserves in the rear, this was also driven back by grapeshot and volley fire. The Mameluke horse reformed and several groups of Mamelukes continued searching and shadowing the French army for an opening to no avail. The French observed from a distance what seemed to be an ad hoc conference between Murad Bey and his chieftains on the small hillock overlooking the battlefield, on which the Mameluke army was arrayed, and at this juncture a massive explosion was heard from the ongoing battle on the Nile, to this end the Mameluke army turned around and retreated southwards, in the process abandoning nine guns that were arranged outside Shubra Khit, aimed at the French army. The Mamluke army supposedly arrived near the scene of the combat on the Nile, and Murad learned of the destruction of the Mamluke flagship, and ordered a general retreat of his army south to Cairo.

Napoleon could only watch as the Mameluke army retreated; he had only 300 cavalry with which a pursuit was unthinkable. He quickly marched his army to the aid of Perrée's beleaguered flotilla. He would, perhaps with some delusion, claim that he could've cut off the Mamluke army had he not been forced to go to the flotilla's aid, although he did not have the cavalry to do so.

=== Naval battle ===
The French flotilla, which was commanded by Jean-Baptiste Perrée, consisted of 25 armed vessels. With his flotilla was driven by strong wind at night and dispersed, he and his staff had no idea so as to their location relative to the land forces. As such, they set onwards, planning to debark at the first habitation they encountered, to thereupon make more efforts to locate the land columns. As luck would have it, Perree's head elements unwittingly ran into an ambush. The Egyptian flotilla was commanded by Murad Bey's naval advisor Nicola, a Greek Christian, his own flotilla comprised seven gun boats. His expert knowledge of the Nile enabled him to orchestrate an effective ambush; a simultaneous attack of gunboats, supported by a battery of nine pounder cannons concealed on the banks. Perree's head elements was attacked and subject to a sharp bombardment from the Mameluke gunboats and river batteries, at approximately the same time the Mamluk cavalry charges began.

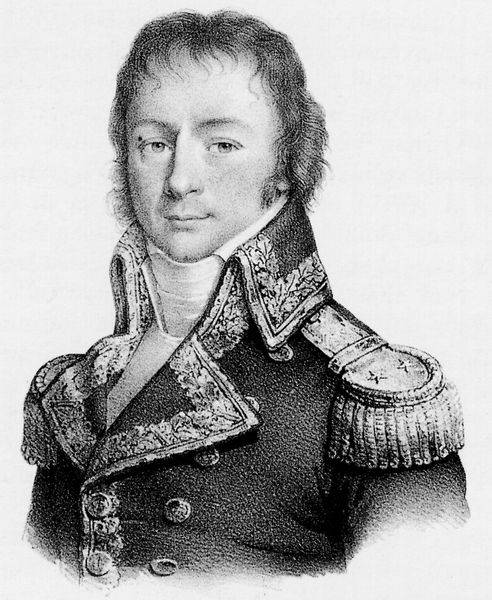
Jean-Baptiste Perrée, who commanded the French naval flotilla at the battle

The Mamluk flotilla, with seven gunboats manned by Greek sailors, starting engaging the French flotilla. Within a short while, two gunboats and the galley had to be abandoned by the French and boarded, leaving only the xebec and the third gunboat in fighting condition, both of which were laden with civilians and soldiers that had abandoned the other ships. The passengers of these ships included Napoleon's secretary, Bourienne, and numerous other savants including Napoleon's friend Monge, and the chemist Berthollet, the former attempting to assist by helping in loading the guns, the latter, seeing the increasingly desperate situation, began filling his pockets with rocks so as to drown fast enough to not be captured by the Mamelukes. Bourienne wrote a grave account of the sight of the enemy boarding their ships;

Soon several of our ships had been boarded by the Turks [as the French called the enemy], and before our eyes they began massacring their crews with barbaric ferocity, holding aloft their decapitated [sic] heads by the hair.

These naval vessels remained under attack from the Mamluk flotilla, along with cannonade & small arms fire from the shore. A boarding attempt on Le Cerf, Perrée's flagship, was resisted by 300 dismounted cavalrymen who were being ferried on the ships, in a brutal melee. Soon afterwards, a French ship managed to score a hit on the magazine of the Mamluk flagship, which caught fire and blew up, sinking the gunboat. At about this time the Mamluk cavalry were about to charge again, but the explosion, along with the French infantry counter-attacking, sent both the flotilla and ground forces into a full retreat. Napoleon advanced hurriedly to the left of Shubrakhit along the Nile to the aid of the flotilla, and the Mameluke flotilla made a hasty retreat at the sight of the French infantry's advance. The battle concluded with, as Perrée and Bourienne would claim, 20 killed and many wounded on the French side, some 1,500 cannon shots had been expended in the engagement on the Nile that lasted from around 8:30 or 9 PM to around noon. Bourienne concluded of the incident;

Some writers have alleged that the Turkish flotilla was destroyed in this engagement. The truth is, the Turks did us considerable injury, while on their part they suffered but little. We had twenty men killed and several wounded. Upwards of 1500 cannon-shots were fired during the action.

== Aftermath ==
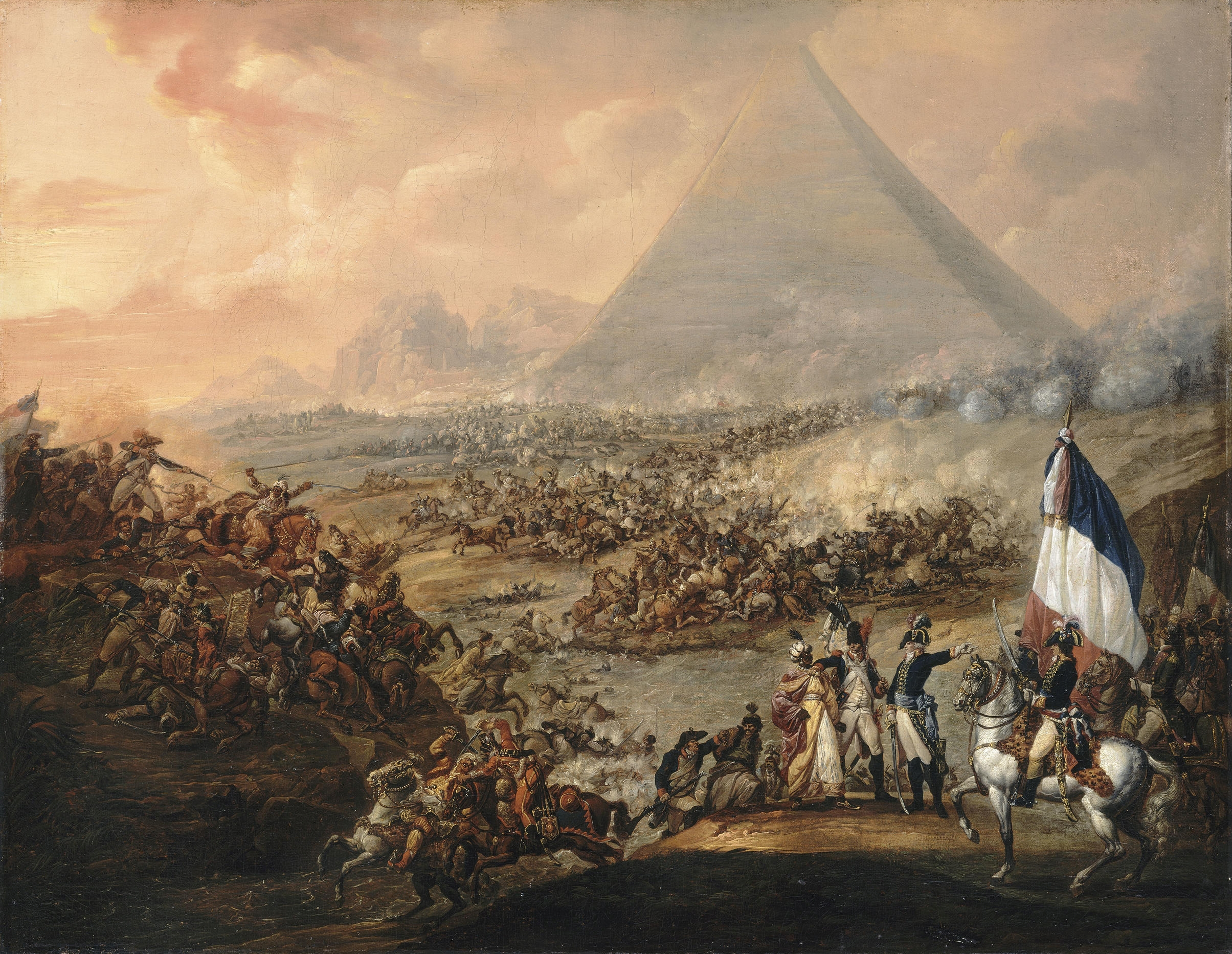
The Battle of the Pyramids, which followed the Battle of Shubra Khit

Perrée was promoted to counter admiral for his service at the battle. He wrote in his report to Vice-admiral François-Paul Brueys d'Aigalliers that his flotilla had suffered "twenty wounded and several killed", and he himself had "lost several parts of his left arm", although some historians estimate his losses at at least several hundred, Napoleon himself writing later that the real French losses at Shubra Khit had been a 'few hundred'. The exact constituents of the Mameluke casualties are not known, but 300 of the elite Mamelukes were casualties during the land fighting near Shubra Khit, and 9 cannons were abandoned. The Egyptian flotilla also suffered the loss of its flagship.

The battle had overall been largely inconclusive, and Napoleon searched in vain for a scapegoat for his future report to the Directory. Some historians would ascribe the battle as being nothing more than a "protracted skirmish", although the battle had given the French vital information on the tactics and the style of warfare of the Mamluks. The Mamluk dead were ravenously looted, and the valuables each one carried insinuated to the soldiers that the country was not as poor as previously thought, owing to the richness of its rulers. After the battle, Napoleon continued his march to Cairo, culminating in a decisive French victory at the Battle of the Pyramids.

== Sources ==
- Harold, J. Christopher (1962). Bonaparte in Egypt. New York: Harper & Row. ISBN 978-1-934757-76-5.
