= French frigate Junon (1782) =

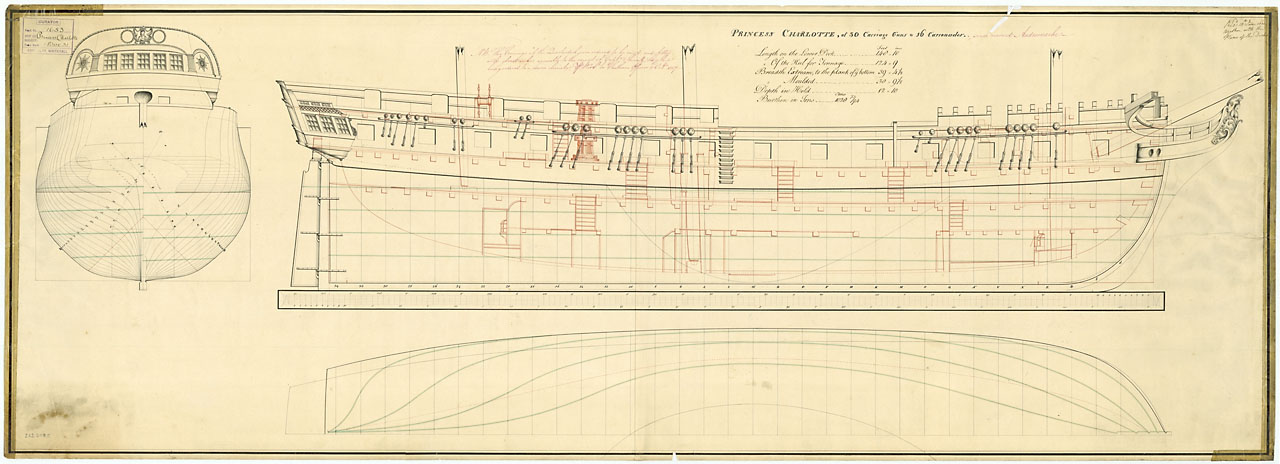
- Princess Charlotte drawn in 1799

History

France
- Name: Junon
- Namesake: Juno
- Ordered: 30 October 1781
- Builder: Toulon shipyard
- Laid down: 10 February 1782
- Launched: 14 August 1782
- Commissioned: 2 May 1786
- Renamed: Andromache in 1812
- Captured: At the action of 18 June 1799

Great Britain
- Name: HMS Princess Charlotte
- Acquired: Captured at the action of 18 June 1799
- Renamed: Andromache in 1812
- Fate: Broken up 1828

General characteristics
- Class & type: Minerve-class frigate
- Displacement: 1330 tonneaux
- Tons burthen: 700 port tonneaux
- Length: 46.1 m (151 ft 3 in)
- Beam: 11.7 m (38 ft 5 in)
- Draught: 5.5 m (18 ft 1 in)
- Sail plan: Ship-rigged
- Armament: French service; 28 × 18-pounder long guns; 12 × 8-pounder long guns

Junon was a 40-gun Minerve-class frigate of the French Navy.

== French service ==
Junon was commissioned in the French Navy under Captain d'Ettry on 2 May 1786. In 1786, Junon served as division flagship for Chef d'escadre Charritte in the 12-ship Escadre d'évolution. She was at Cherbourg on 24 June when a naval review and a simulated naval battle took place as Louis XVI visited the harbour. Later that year, she became the flagship for the French division off Western Africa, under Chef de Division Joseph de Flotte.

In late 1790, under Lieutenant Villeneuve d'Esclapon, she prepared to sail from Toulon, but never departed. In June 1792, Junon escorted merchantmen from Toulon into the Atlantic Ocean under Lieutenant Terras de Rodeillac.

In December 1792, she ferried Ambassador Sémonville to Constantinople, before returning to cruise off Sardinia, notably supporting the landing of French troops on 14 January 1793.

From 26 August 1793, she was under the command of Lieutenant Le Duey, in Marseille. From there, she escorted a convoy of merchantmen to Toulon, sailed to cruise in the Mediterranean and the Gulf of Antibes, conducted reconnaissance off the coasts of Provence, and returned to Toulon. Lieutenant Villeneuve d'Esclapon replaced Le Duey on 25 December 1793; Villeneuve was promoted to captain before 16 August 1794.

From August 1795 to January 1796, Junon cruised in consort with Sérieuse in the Mediterranean.

In the fleet of Toulon, Junon took part in the Mediterranean campaign of 1798, running aground upon her arrival at Abukir. After having been repaired in Alexandria, Junon, under Captain Pourquier, became part of the Syrian naval station under Rear-admiral Perrée. She ferried artillery and ammunition of the French Army besieging Acre.

A British squadron under Captain John Markham in HMS Centaur captured Junon in the action of 18 June 1799 as Perrée's squadron attempted to return to Toulon. The Royal Navy recommissioned her as the 38-gun fifth rate HMS Princess Charlotte.

== British service ==
At 10am on 13 December 1804, Princess Charlotte was four leagues (19 km) west of Cape Antonio when she sighted an unknown brig. After a chase of seven hours southward, Princess Charlotte caught up with her quarry at Lat. 30° 50' N Long. 85° 32' W. The brig surrendered after her pursuer had fired four or five shots. The quarry was the French privateer Regulus, out of Guadaloupe. She was pierced for 14 guns but had only 11 on board, having thrown two overboard during the chase. She had a crew of 88 men under the command of Citizen Jacque Mathieu. Captain F.F. Gardner of Princess Charlotte described Regulus as "a very fine Vessel" that "sails remarkably well" and is "perfectly adapted for His Majesty's Service". The Royal Navy took her into service as HMS Morne Fortunee, there being an HMS Regulus already in service.

The French corvettes Naïade and Cyane left Martinique on 29 September 1805 provisioned for a cruise of three months. Enseigne de vaisseau Hamon, who had assumed command of Naïade shortly before they sailed, was the senior officer of the pair.

Six days later Princess Charlotte was off Tobago when she sighted them in the distance. The two French vessels were too far away for Princess Charlotte to chase them. Captain George Tobin of Princess Charlotte decided to disguise his vessel as best he could in the hope that he could lure them to approach. He was successful and an engagement ensued.

Eventually, Princess Charlotte succeeded in capturing Cyane, which had been a Royal Navy sloop until the French had captured her in May; Naïade as Tobin put it, "by taking a more prudent Situation and superior sailing, effected her Escape without any apparent Injury."

Cyane was armed with twenty 6-pounder and two 4-pounder guns, and six 12-pounder carronades. She had a crew of 190 men under the command of lieutenant de vaisseau Mesnard (Meynard). Mesnard "defended his Ship in a very gallant Manner", with the result that Cyane had three men killed and nine wounded. The French fired high, attempting to damage Princess Charlotte's rigging; consequently she had only one man killed and six wounded, one of them mortally. A French account of the battle describes in detail how well Meynard maneuvered and fought before being forced to strike. The Royal Navy took Cyane back into service as HMS Cerf.

On 27 May 1811, Princess Charlotte was in company with the Rhin when they captured the American ship Fox.

In 1812, Princess Charlotte was renamed HMS Andromache.

On 11 December 1812, together with the frigate Briton, Andromache took the American brig Leader from Boston bound for Bordeaux, France with a cargo of fish, and then on 10 December the French privateer San Souci from St Malo. San Souci of 14 guns, had a crew of 120 men. San Souci arrived at Plymouth on 20 December. Lloyd's List described her as being of 16 guns and having a crew of 70. It further reported that Andromache and Briton had chased Sans Souci for 12 hours before catching her. San Souci had been out six weeks and had captured two British vessels, Speculation, which had been sailing from Cork to Lisbon, and the South Seas whaler Frederick. Sans Souci had only captured Frederick after an hour-long engagement in which Frederick lost her mate killed, and had "Body" and three or four other crew severely wounded. Sans Souci had on board the crew from Frederick. (Note: Sans Souci had been commissioned in October 1812. According to French records, under François Rosse she cruised from October to December 1812, with 100 and 120 men, and four 6-pounders and four 6-pounder carronades.e)

On 17 December the two frigates captured the American brig Columbia, loaded with coffee and sugar en route from Philadelphia to Bordeaux then the brig Stephen carrying cotton, potash and skins from New York to Bordeaux, shortly followed by the brig Exception on 20 December, underway from Philadelphia to Bordeaux loaded with cotton.

The American ship Mount Hope, which had been sailing from Georgetown to Cadiz when a French privateer captured her, arrived at Plymouth on 12 May 1813, after Andromache recaptured her. A later account has the capture taking place on 5 May, Mount Hope's voyage as starting in Charlestown, and her cargo as rice. Her captors were Andromeda, rather than Andromache, and Surveillante and HMS Iris.

On 23 October 1813 Andromache captured the French frigate Trave after an engagement of only 15 minutes. Trave, although a new vessel, had lost her masts in a storm and was sailing under jury-rigged masts and so unable to maneuver. She was armed with twenty-eight French 18-pounder long guns sixteen 18-pounder carronades, and had a crew of 321 men, almost all Dutch. Before she struck she had one man killed, and 28 men wounded, including her commander capitaine de frégate Jacob Van Maren. Andromache had little damage and only two men wounded. The Royal Navy took Trave into service as the troopship Trave. At the time of the capture the ketch HMS Gleaner was in sight, though it is not clear what she could have added had the engagement lasted longer.

On 14 March 1813 Andromache captured the Baltimore letter of marque Courier, off Nantes. Courier, of 251 tons (bm), was armed with six 12-pounder carronades and had a crew of 35 men under the command of Captain Robert Davis. She was sailing back to Baltimore from Nantes.

Two weeks later, on 2 April, Sealark and Andromache captured the American ship Good Friends. The privateer Cerberus was in sight. (Note: Captain John Tregowith had received a letter of marque on 13 January 1813 for the brig Cerberus, of 294 tons (bm), ten 9 and 4-pounder guns and six 18-pounder carronades, and 48 men.)

== Post script to the war ==
In January 1819, the London Gazette reported that Parliament had voted a grant to all those who had served under the command of Lord Keith in 1812, between 1812 and 1814, and in the Gironde. Andromache was listed among the vessels that had served under Keith in 1813 and 1814. (Note: The money was paid in three tranches. For someone participating in the first through third tranches, a first-class share was worth £256 5s 9d; a sixth-class share was worth £4 6s 10d. For someone participating only in the second and third tranches a first-class share was worth £202 6s 8d; a sixth-class share was worth £5 0s 5d.) She had also served under Keith in the Gironde. (Note: The sum of the two tranches of payment for that service was £272 8s 5d for a first-class share; the amount for a sixth-class share was £3 3s 5d.)

During September 1817, Edward Bransfield was appointed master of HMS Andromache under the command of Captain William Henry Shirreff. It was during this tour of duty that Andromanche was posted to the Royal Navy's new Pacific Squadron off Valparaíso in Chile. When William Smith, captain of the merchantman William arrived at Valparaiso he reported the discovery of the South Shetland Islands in October 1819 while on a voyage from Buenos Aires to Valparaiso. Andromanche, accompanied by William, sailed to investigate the discovery, and on 30 January 1820, they made what was probably the first sighting of the Antarctic Continent, along with the first record of an Antarctic plant, Deschampsia antarctica.

== Fate ==
Andromache was sold for scrap and dismantled in Deptford in 1828.
