= Esprit-Tranquille Maistral =

French Navy officer (1763–1815)

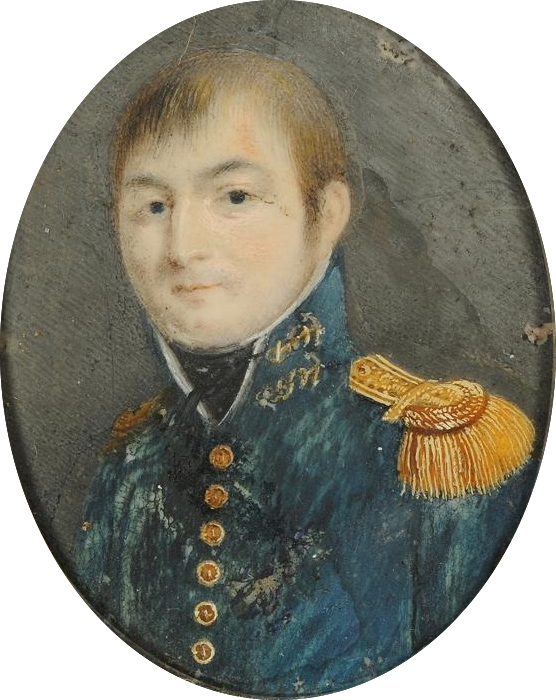
- Born: 21 May 1763; Quimper, France
- Died: 5 November 1815 (aged 52); Guipavas, France
- Relatives: Désiré-Marie Maistral
- Military career
- Branch: French Navy
- Rank: contre-amiral
- Conflicts: American Revolutionary War; French Revolutionary Wars; Battle of Trafalgar

Esprit-Tranquille Maistral (French pronunciation: [ɛspʁi tʁɑ̃kil mɛstʁal]; Quimper, 21 May 1763 – Guipavas, 5 November 1815) was a French Navy officer. He took part in the War of American Independence and in the French Revolutionary Wars, and had a pivotal role in the Battle of Trafalgar.

== Career ==
Esprit-Tranquille Maistral was born to François Louis Maistral, a physician, and his wife Françoise Yvonne Bouisse. He was the brother of Désiré-Marie Maistral. Maistral joined the Navy as a boy on 1 July 1775 on Oiseau. The following year, he served as a sailor on Roland, and on 27 April 1778, he was promoted helmsman on the Bretagne.

=== American Revolutionary war ===
On 29 June 1778, he volunteered for service on the Vengeur, taking part in the Battle of Ushant (1778), the Battle of Grenada, the Battle of Martinique (1779), the Battle of Martinique (1780) and in action off Saint Lucia on 16 and 19 May 1780.

On 18 February 1781, he was promoted to Lieutenant de frégate, and appointed to Scipion. Aboard, he took part in the Battle of Fort Royal, the Battle of the Chesapeake, the Battle of Saint Kitts, and the Battle of the Saintes. In the action of 18 October 1782, Maistral was wounded by a splinter. After the sinking of Scipion on 20 October, Maistral returned to France in April 1782 on Fantasque, arriving in July.

On 22 July 1783, Maistral was promoted to lieutenant de frégate entretenu, and appointed to the fluyt Étoile. In October 1783, Étoile departed Lorient, bound for San Domingo where she arrived in September 1784. The next year, he transferred to the fluyt Mulet in Brest, and left in October 1785 for San Domingo, which he reached in April of the next year.

On 1 May 1786, Maistral was promoted to Sous-lieutenant de vaisseau and appointed to the Malin from June to September. He then transferred on the brand new 74-gun Léopard, on which he sailed from July to February 1788. From March to November 1788, he cruised off Terre-Neuve on the corvette Vigilante.

=== French Revolution ===
From March 1790 to August 1791, Maistral served on the corvette Sans-Soucis, off San Domingo. He transferred on the frigate Proserpine in June, and in November on the fluyt Normande.

On 1 January 1792, Maistral was promoted to Lieutenant. On 12 November, he was appointed to the 74-gun Éole, in station off San Domingo. On 1 January 1793, he was promoted to Captain 2nd class; he took command of Éole from 20 March to 8 April, and from 16 May to 25 June, he captained Normande.

On 1 January 1794, he rose to Captain first class. Arrived in Brest on 25 June, he was arrested and detained in the Château de Brest. He was freed on 18 November 1794, after the Thermidorian Reaction, and served in Brest harbour.

On 21 March, he was promoted to Commodor (Chef de division) and took command of the 110-gun Terrible from 27 April to 11 November. On 12, he transferred to the 74-gun Fougueux, on which he took part in the Expédition d'Irlande, and which he commanded until 17 August 1797.

On 9 March 1798, Maistral took command of Mont Blanc, on which he took part in Bruix' expedition of 1799; on 5 March 1800, he was replaced by his brother, Captain Désiré Marie Maistral, to temporally captain the 80-gun Formidable, flagship of contre-amiral Pierre Dumanoir le Pelley, until 26 April, when he returned to the command of Mont Blanc, keeping her until 24 January 1801.

On 29 June, he married Rose Aimée Perrine Chardon de Courcelles in Brest.

On 23 September 1800, the rank of commodore was suppressed in the French Navy, and Maistral was retrograded to captain. He then successively commanded the 74-gun ships Patriote, on which he cruise off San Domingo from 25 January 1801 to 27 April 1802; the Berwick, which he used to ferry troops to Martinique from 28 April 1802 to 12 June 1803; and the Annibal from 13 June 1803 to 10 June 1804.

=== First Empire ===
On 11 June 1804, he was appointed to the 80-gun Neptune. Commanding this ship, he took part in the Trafalgar Campaign. At the Battle of Cape Finisterre, he supported Atlas. At the Battle of Trafalgar, Neptune came immediately after the flagship Bucentaure, but was separated from her lead, opening a weakness that allowed HMS Victory to rake the French flagship and cut the French line, despite the efforts of Redoutable to fill the gap. Neptune aided Principe de Asturias and retreated to Cadiz.

After Trafalgar, Maistral fell out of favour and was deprived of command until 12 November 1810, when he took command of the 15th flotilla crew. On 1 April 1811, he transferred to the 19th crew, and from 20 July 1813 to 18 July 1814, he was the military officer in charge of Brest harbour.

On 1 July 1814, Maistral was promoted to contre-amiral, and retired three months later. During the Bourbon restauration, he was confirmed in his rank and pension.

He died in his home of Pénandalot at 2 in the night on 5 November 1815.

== Honours ==
- Officer of the Legion of Honour
- Knight of the Order of Saint-Louis

== In literature ==
In The Commodore, Patrick O'Brian names the head of the French squadron coming to West Cork for a rematch of the Expédition d'Irlande as Esprit-Tranquille Maistral. Again, the French lose, though coming much closer to success, and Maistral surrenders to Aubrey, and then is taken aboard HMS Bellona.
