= French frigate Mignonne (1767) =

French Navy warship

History

France
- Name: Mignonne (Note: Mignonne was ordered as Precieuse but was renamed shortly before launch.)
- Namesake: "Pretty"
- Ordered: 5 August 1765
- Builder: Toulon Dockyard; constructeur: Claude Saussillon
- Laid down: October 1765
- Launched: 26 April 1767
- Captured: 10 August 1794

Great Britain
- Name: Mignonne
- Acquired: 10 August 1794 by capture
- Fate: Burnt July 1797

General characteristics
- Type: Frigate
- Displacement: 880 tonneaux
- Tons burthen: 500 port tonneaux; 684 (bm)
- Length: 38.98 m (127.9 ft) (overall); 35.08 m (115.1 ft) (keel)
- Beam: 10.39 m (34.1 ft)
- Draught: 4.22 m (13.8 ft) (unladen)
- Depth of hold: 5.12 m (16.8 ft)
- Propulsion: Sails
- Complement: French service: 157–200; British service: 220
- Armament: French service: 26 × 8-pounder long guns + 4 × 4-pounder guns on the Spar Deck; 6 × 4-pounders from 1787; British service: 26 × 9-pounder guns + 6 smaller guns on the QD and Fc

The French frigate Mignonne was a one-off design by Jean-Baptiste Doumet-Revest; she was launched in 1767 at Toulon. Some notable French captains commanded her before the British captured her at Calvi in 1794 and took her into the Royal Navy as HMS Mignonne. She was burnt in 1797 as useless.

== French service ==
On 2 April 1771, Commander Chabert was given command of Mignonne, and conducted a cruise to test a chronometer made by Ferdinand Berthoud. Upon his return, in late November, Chabert was promoted to captain.

In 1772 Mignonne came under the command of Suffren, who had just been promoted to the rank of captain. He commanded her and later Alcemene in the squadron that the French government had established for the purpose of training its officers.

In 1793 the French Navy had Mignonne razeed, converting her to a corvette.

On 22 October 1793 Mignonne was part of a five-vessel squadron under the command of Jean-Baptiste Perrée. In addition to Mignonne, the squadron included the frigates Melpomene, Minerve, and Fortunée, and the brig Hasard. They encountered the 64-gun third rate HMS Agamemnon, under the command of Captain Horatio Nelson. Agamemnon and Fortunée engaged in an inconclusive action before the French squadron chose not to pursue the matter and sailed off.

== Capture ==
On 18 June 1794, Agamemnon anchored south of Calvi. Once the Royal Navy’s Mediterranean fleet under Vice-Admiral Hood arrived, the British commenced a 51-day siege of the town, which surrendered on 10 August. Shortly, thereafter the inhabitants of Corsica declared themselves to be subjects of His Majesty King George III.

The British captured five vessels at Calvi, two frigates – Melopmène and Mignonne – and three small armed vessels, the brigs Auguste and Providence, each of four guns, and the gun-boat Ca Ira, of three guns. (Note: Auguste had been requisitioned in June 1793, and Providence in 1793-4. Ca Ira had been commissioned in June or July 1794.) Melpomène was a new vessel and the British were glad to take her into service, which they did under her existing name; she served in the Royal Navy until 1815. The 27-year-old Mignonne they too took into service under her existing name but without the same expressions of enthusiasm.

== British service ==
Mignonne was commissioned under Commander Henry Hotham. Commander Ralph Miller recommissioned her in November 1795. On 13 June 1796 D’Arcy Preston was promoted to post captain in Mignonne. His replacement in September was Captain Charles Stuart. On 19 October John Giffard was similarly promoted into Mignonne. His successor, in December, was Captain Philip Wodehouse.

== Fate ==
Captain Nelson wrote to Admiral Jervis on 29 December 1796 that he expected to be able to sell Tarleton and Mignonne. Clearly he was unable to as on 31 July 1797 the British burnt Mignonne as unserviceable when they withdrew from Porto Ferrajo.
