= Action of 18 June 1799 =

1799 battle of the War of the Second Coalition

- Part of the War of the Second Coalition
Date	18 June 1799
Location	Off Toulon, Mediterranean Sea
Result	British victory

Belligerents
Great Britain	France

Commanders and leaders
Lord Keith; John Markham	Jean-Baptiste Perrée

Strength
3 ships of the line 2 frigates	3 frigates 2 brigs

Casualties and losses
Unknown	3 frigates captured 2 brigs captured

The action of 18 June 1799 was a naval engagement of the War of the Second Coalition fought off Toulon in the wake of the Mediterranean campaign of 1798. A frigate squadron under Counter-admiral Jean-Baptiste Perrée, returning to Toulon from Syria, met a 30-ship British fleet under Lord Keith. Three ships of the line and two frigates detached from the British squadron, and a 28-hour running battle ensued. When the British ships overhauled them, the French frigates and brigs had no choice but to surrender, given their opponents' overwhelming strength.

== Background ==
In the opening moves of the Mediterranean campaign of 1798, the French Navy's Toulon squadron, under Vice-admiral Brueys, embarked a 40,000-man force and rushed to land them in Egypt. The landing of the Army, under General Bonaparte, proceeded well and the French Army scored successes against the Ottomans and the Mameluks. However, the Royal Navy, under Admiral Nelson, obliterated most of the naval squadron at the Battle of the Nile.

After the crushing losses sustained at Abukir, the French naval forces available to Bonaparte amounted to a number of frigates and the many captured French sailors that Nelson released, being unwilling to feed so many prisoners. Napoleon incorporated the sailors into units for duty on shore, or on a flotilla of xebecs and galleys on the Nile. The frigates, on the other hand, could prove useful in supporting the land forces by blockading besieged Ottoman fortresses, conducting shore bombardments, and ferrying supplies; furthermore, as their 18-pounder long guns were the equivalent of heavy siege pieces in the Army, their artillery and ammunition could be borrowed for land combat.

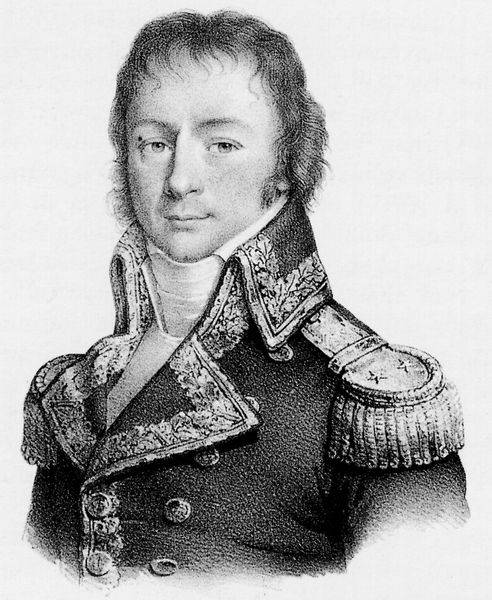
Rear-admiral Perrée, commander of the French squadron

With the French invasion of Egypt and Syria shifting its centre of gravity to the east, notably with the Siege of Acre, Rear-admiral Perrée was given command of a squadron of three frigates and two brigs, survivors of the Battle of the Nile, to ferry supplies and artillery for the Army in spite of the Ottoman and British blockades. The squadron comprised the frigates Junon (Commander Pourquier), Courageuse (Captain Trullet) and Alceste (Captain Barré), and the brigs Salamine (Lieutenant Landry) and Alerte (Demay). After they had arrived at Jaffa, the frigates unloaded their cargo, and furthermore shared their ammunition with the army, leaving the frigates with only 15 shots per gun; Junon also landed four of her 18-pounder long guns. The division then established a blockade to complete the Siege of Acre.

On 14 May, two British ships of the line and a frigate, under Sidney Smith, chased the frigate squadron, which quickly eluded its pursuers. Despite specific orders not to go to Europe unless it was unavoidable, Perrée conferred with his officers and decided that his low supplies made it necessary for him to return to Toulon, via Lampedusa, where he would replenish his water.

== Battle ==
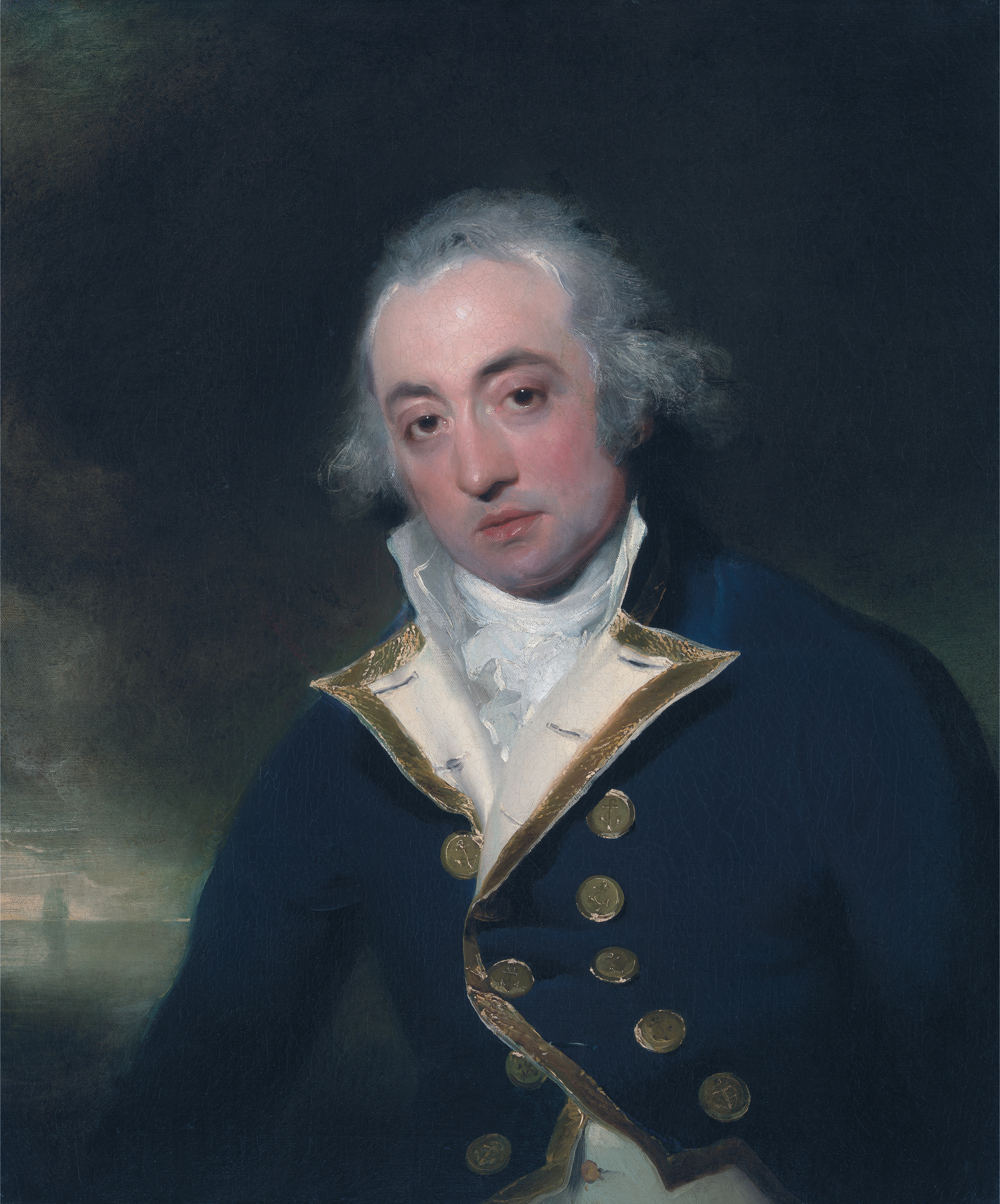
Captain John Markham who led the British forces from HMS Centaur.

Sixty miles from Toulon, on 17 June 1799, Perrée's division spotted a 30-ship fleet under Lord Keith. A task force of three 74-gun ships of the line and two frigates, all under Captain John Markham on Centaur, separated from the main British body to give chase.

As the wind blew only very weakly from the south-west, the chase lasted all of 28 hours, and it was not until the next evening that the two groups came in contact. Over the course of the chase, the French squadron, sailing to the north-west, lost its cohesion. By the evening, Junon and Alceste sailed together within hailing range of each other, while Courageuse tacked one mile off her flagship; the brigs Salamine and Alerte were respectively four and seven miles ahead of Junon.

At 19:00, Thompson's 74-gun Bellona, closely followed by Captain and two frigates, came within a quarter-mile of Junon. When Bellona opened fire, Junon and Alceste immediately struck.

Meanwhile, HMS Centaur had come up on Courageuse and commenced firing on her. After securing the surrender of Junon and Alceste, HMS Bellona turned to Courageuse and soon joined in the action. Threatened by two 74-guns, Courageuse struck.

A while later, HMS Emerald overhauled Salamine and secured her surrender. Captain similarly forced Alerte to strike at 23:30.

Lloyd's List reported on 26 July that Lord Keith's squadron in the Mediterranean had captured Alceste (of 36 guns and 460 men), Juno (of 44 guns and 560 men), Courageuse (of 44 guns and 500 men), and two corvettes of 16 guns each.

== Aftermath ==
Perrée, who had been taken prisoner, was exchanged almost immediately. From 6 October to 25 November 1799 Perrée underwent court martial, presided by Vice-admiral Thévenard, for the loss of his ships. The court found that the superior Ottoman and British forces off Syria, the partial disarmament of the frigates, and their low food and water supplies had been legitimate reasons for Perrée to return to Toulon. The court then unanimously honourably acquitted Perrée.

The British took Junon into the Royal Navy as HMS Princess Charlotte. Courageuse was similarly incorporated, but soon became a prison hulk, possibly at Minorca, but more likely at Malta. Alceste became a floating battery. The Royal Navy commissioned Alerte as HMS Minorca. Salamine became HMS Salamine; she served in the Mediterranean, where she captured two privateers. The Royal Navy then disposed of Alceste, Alerte, and Salamine in 1802 after the Treaty of Amiens.
