= Shubra Khit =

Shubra Khit شبراخيت
- Town
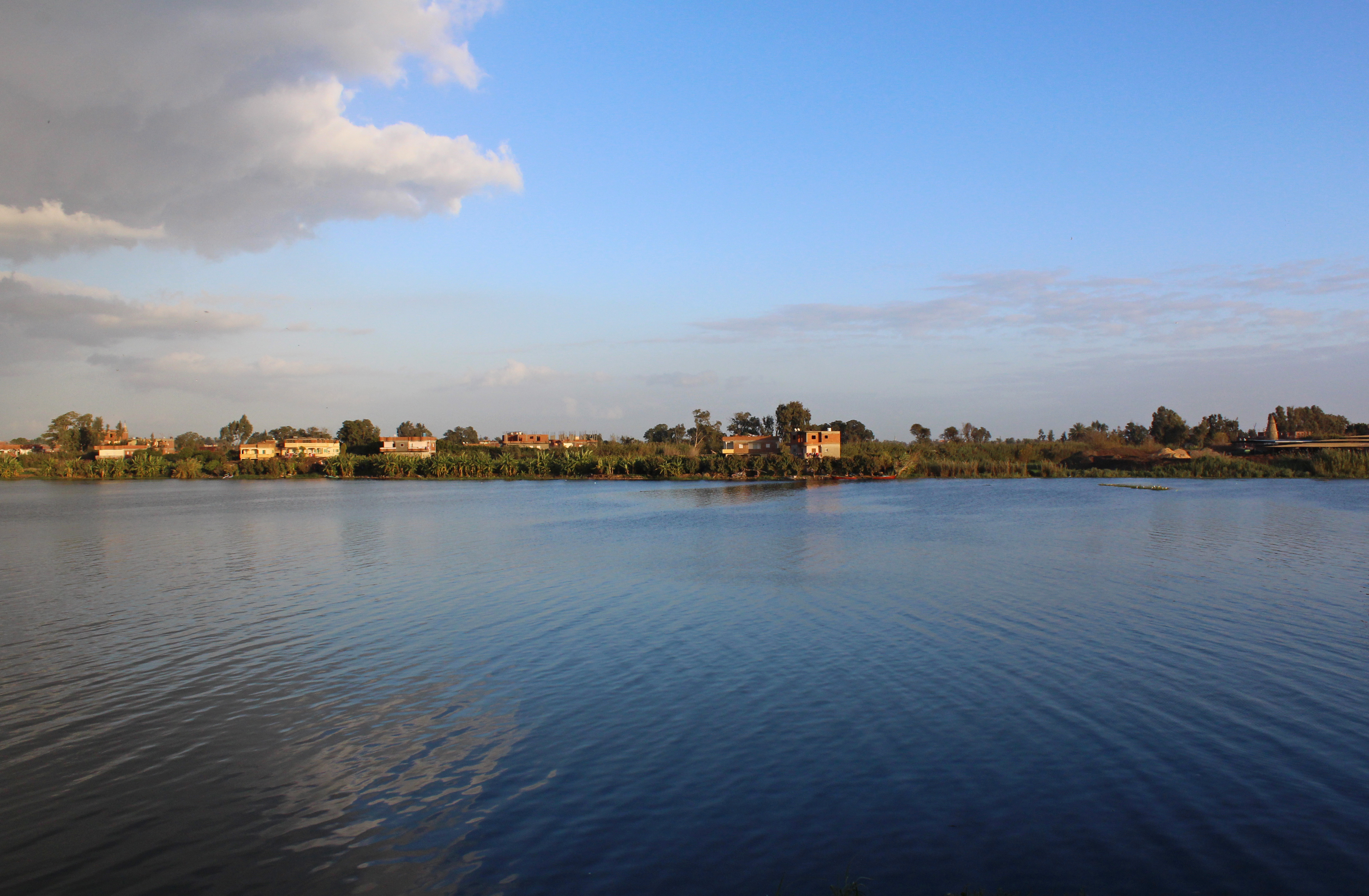
- The Nile in Shubra Khit

- Location in Egypt
- Coordinates: 31°1′39″N 30°42′46″E
- Country: Egypt
- Governorate: Beheira Governorate

Area
  - Total: 195.9 km^{2} (75.6 sq mi)

Population (2021)
  - Total: 295,777
  - Density: 1,510/km^{2} (3,910/sq mi)
- Time zone: UTC+2 (EET)
  - Summer (DST): UTC+3 (EEST)

Shubra Khit (Arabic: شبراخيت, from Coptic: ϫⲉⲃⲣⲟ ϧⲏⲧ, lit. 'northern hamlet') is a town in Beheira Governorate in Egypt, which is famous for being the place of the "Battle of Shubra Khit" between the army of Napoleon Bonaparte and the Mamluk cavalry under Murad Bey on July 13, 1798.

Shubra Khit had a population of 28,505 in the 2017 census.
