= Jean-Baptiste Perrée =

French Navy officer (1761–1800)

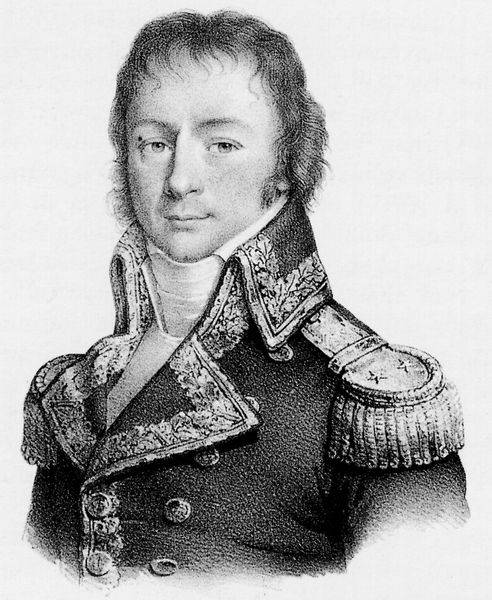
- Portrait by Antoine Maurin, 1835
- Born: 19 December 1761; Saint-Valery-sur-Somme, France
- Died: 18 February 1800 (aged 38); Généreux, Mediterranean Sea
- Military career
- Allegiance: Kingdom of France; French First Republic
- Branch: French Navy
- Service years: 1793–1800
- Rank: Counter admiral
- Conflicts: French Revolutionary Wars; Action of 22 October 1793; French invasion of Egypt and Syria; Battle of Shubra Khit (WIA); Action of 18 June 1799; Battle of the Malta Convoy †
- Awards: Sabre of honour from General Bonaparte

Counter-Admiral Jean-Baptiste Perrée (19 December 1761 – 18 February 1800) was a French Navy officer who served in the French Revolutionary Wars.

== Career ==
Born to a family of sailors in Saint-Valery-sur-Somme, Perrée started sailing in 1773 at the age of twelve as a boy on the merchantman Glorieuse, under his father. In the course of the following twenty years, he steadily rose in rank in the merchant navy, took part in a campaign on the fluyt Boulonnaise in the French Navy as an aid-pilot, and earned his commission of Sea captain in 1785.

=== Commerce raiding on Proserpine ===
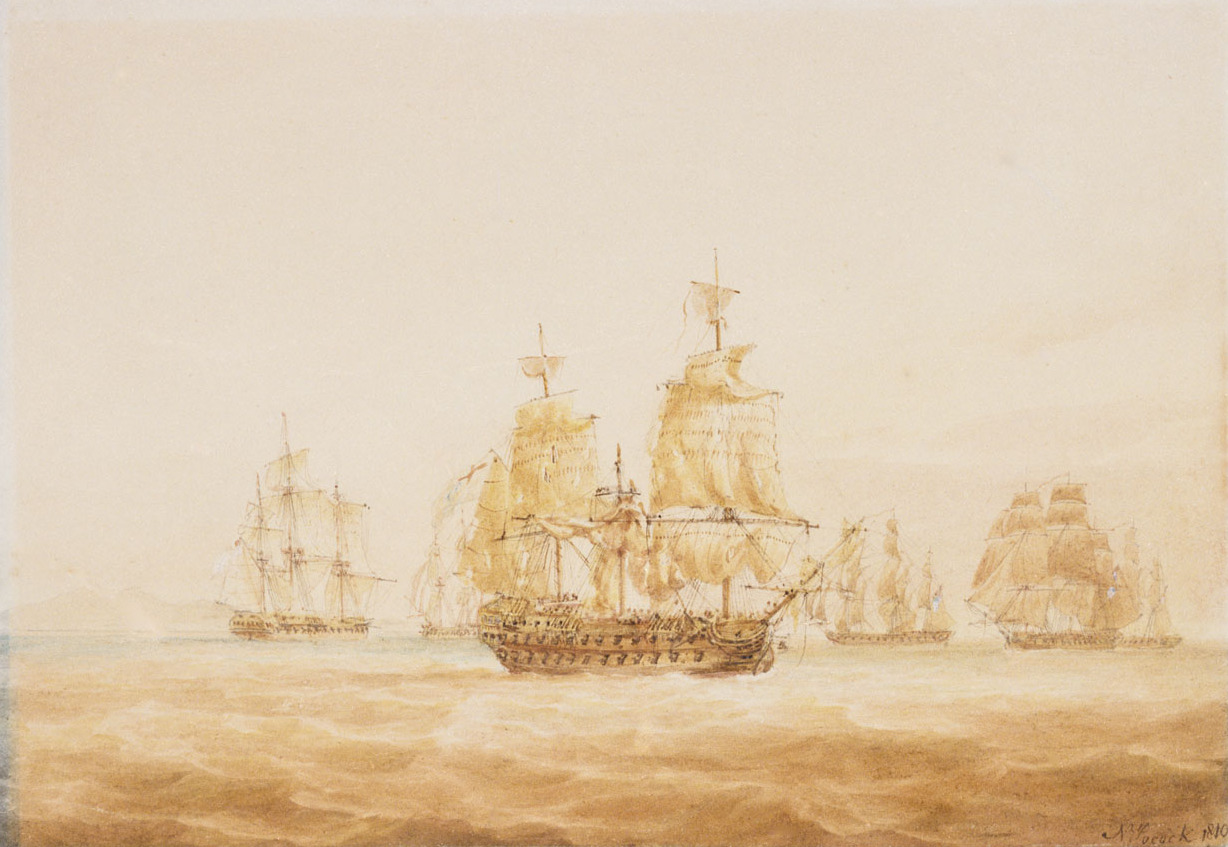
The action of 22 October 1793, where Perrée first fought against Nelson

In 1793, when France declared war on Britain during the War of the First Coalition, Perrée enlisted in the Navy as an acting Ensign. (Note: Enseigne non entretenu (Granier, p. 162)) In September 1793, he was reported to be commanding a frigate squadron in the Western Mediterranean, fighting the inconclusive action of 22 October 1793 against Captain Horatio Nelson.

Promoted to acting Lieutenant in May 1794, (Note: Granier (p. 162) states that Perrée was confirmed in the rank of Lieutenant in October; however, according to the Fonds Marine, he appears to have held the rank of Captain since September at least.) and took command of the frigate Proserpine in April 1794 to conduct commerce raiding operations; in his eight-month campaign, he captured over 63 British merchantmen and a 32-gun Dutch States Navy frigate on 21 May. (Note: Troude names her as Vigilante in the French Navy, but she does not appear in Roche's Dictionnaire des Bâtiments.)

On 13 September 1794, (Note: Granier (p. 162) says 1795) Perrée was ship-of-the-line captain, and was appointed to command a squadron in the Mediterranean, comprising the frigate Alceste, under Lieutenant Louis-Jean-Nicolas Lejoille, and the 18-gun brig Hazard, under Lieutenant Amand Leduc. The squadron returned to Toulon on 10 October.

He set sail for another mission on 15 November, this time on Minerve, in consort with Alceste and the 20-gun corvette Brune, under Ensign Louis Gabriel Deniéport. The squadron cruised in the Mediterranean and sailed for a diplomatic mission to Tunis before returning to Toulon on 29 December.

On 4 February 1795, Perrée cruised again on Minerve, this time in consort with the frigate Sérieuse, under Lieutenant Saunier. The two frigates cruised in the Mediterranean together until Sérieuse detached to ferry funds to Algiers. Minerve returned to Toulon on 24 February, and Sérieuse, on 20 May.

In September 1795, was given command of a four-frigate and two-corvette squadron to prey on British shipping off the West African coast and raid their trading posts; during the campaign, he captured 54 merchantmen.

On 26 April 1796, Perrée departed with the Mediterranean squadron, commanding the brand-new frigate Diane and ferrying diplomats, supplies and ammunitions to Constantinople until 14 November.

In early 1797, Perrée took command of a squadron in the Adriatic Sea. The squadron comprised the frigate Diane, under Lieutenant Hubert; the corvette Brune, still under Deniéport, who was promoted to Commander; the gunboat Frimaire, under Ensign Suply; and the brig Jason, under Lieutenant Sénéquier.

In early 1799, Perrée commanded the naval station of the Syrian coasts, part of the Mediterranean squadron, with his flag on the frigate Junon.

=== Campaign in Egypt and the action of 18 June 1799 ===
In the Mediterranean squadron, Perrée took command of the 74-gun Mercure, but was replaced by Lieutenant Cambon after the landing of the troops.

With the rank of captain, Perrée acted as a chief of division during the French invasion of Egypt: General Bonaparte appointed him to the Nile flotilla, where he commanded a squadron of shebeks and other light craft. On 13 July, the flotilla fought against Egyptian fluvial ships and forts while supplying food and ammunition to the French Army, and Perrée managed to captured some of these ships and ward off the others. Wounded during the prelude of the Battle of Shubra Khit, Perrée was promoted to counter admiral on the insistence of Bonaparte, and received a sabre of honour inscribed "Bataille de Chabreis" on one side of the blade, and "Donné par le général Bonaparte" on the other.

When the French campaign in the Middle East turned to Syria, Perrée took command of a squadron of three frigates and two brigs, survivors of the Battle of the Nile, to ferry supplies and artillery for the Army past Ottoman and British blockades. The squadron comprised the frigates Junon (Commander Pourquier), Courageuse (Captain Trullet) and Alceste (Captain Barré), and the brigs Salamine (Lieutenant Landry) and Alerte (Demay). Arrived at Jaffa, the frigates unloaded their cargo, and furthermore shared their own ammunition, leaving the frigates with only 15 shots per gun; Junon also landed four of her 18-pounder long guns.

The division then established a blockade to complete the Siege of Acre. On 14 May, it was chased by two enemy ships of the line and a frigate, under Sidney Smith, which it quickly eluded. In spite of specific orders to land in Europe only if he could not possibly do otherwise, Perrée conferred with his officers and decided that his low supplies made it necessary for him to return to Toulon, by way of Lampedusa, where he would replenish his water.

At 60 miles from Toulon, on 18 June 1799, Perrée's division met a 30-ship fleet under Lord Keith; a 28-hour chase started and in the ensuing action of 18 June 1799, all of Perrée's ships were captured.

Perrée was taken prisoner and exchanged almost immediately. Court-martialled from 6 October to 25 November 1799 for the loss of his ships by a court presided by Vice-admiral Thévenard, the court found that the superior Ottoman and British forces off Syria, the partial disarmament of the frigates and their low food and water supplies had been legitimate reasons for Perrée to return to Toulon. Perrée was then honourably acquitted on a unanimous decision of the council.

=== Battle of the Malta Convoy ===
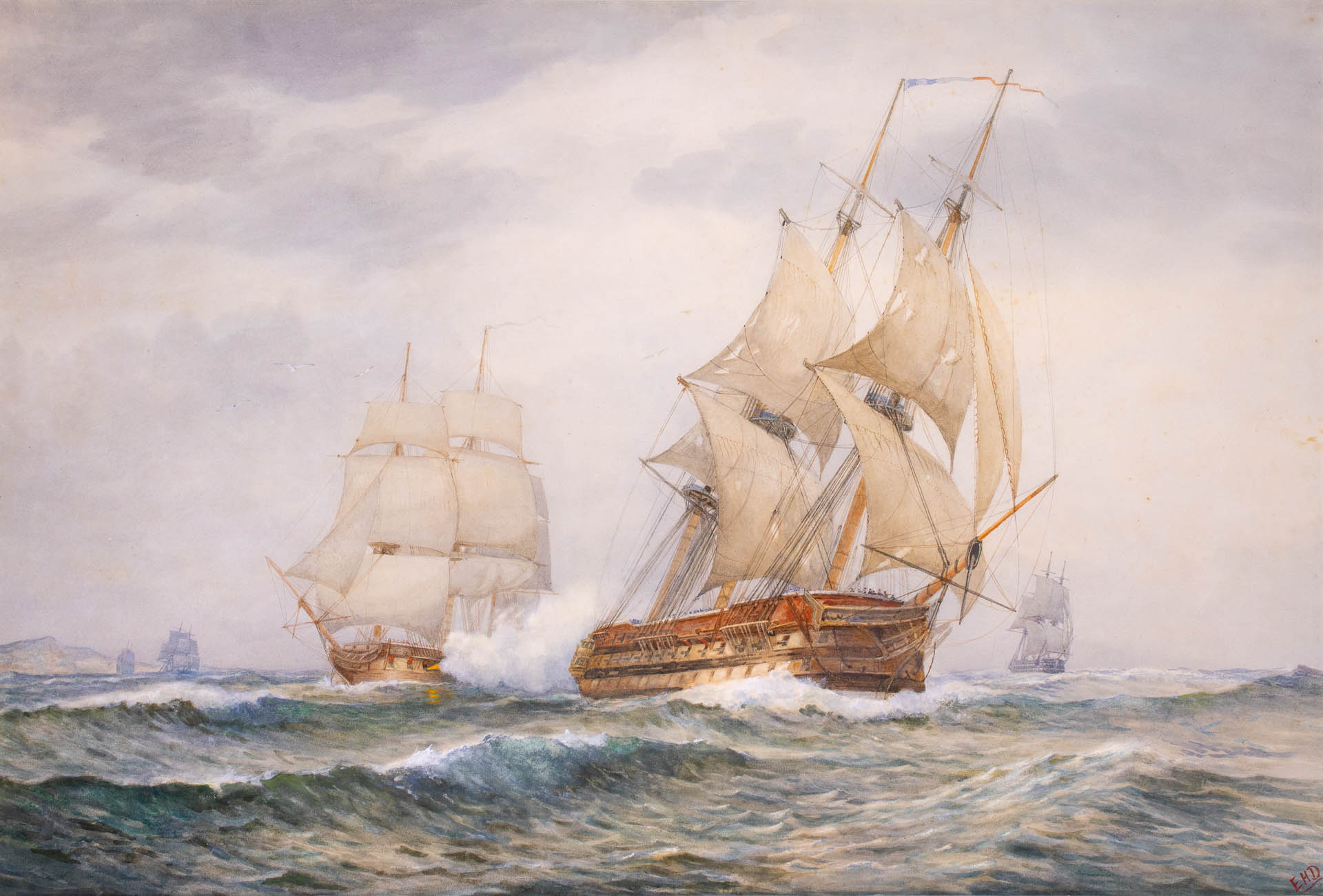
Généreux (second from right) under Perrée during the Battle of the Malta Convoy

From 28 November, he took command of a naval division tasked to ferry food supplies from Toulon to Malta, with his flag on the 74-gun Généreux.

From 28 November, Perrée was appointed to command a small naval division tasked with supplying Malta. The division was composed of the 74-gun Généreux (under Captain Cyprien Renaudin) as flagship, the 20-gun corvettes Badine and Fauvette, the 16-gun Sans Pareille and the fluyt Ville de Marseille (under Joseph Allemand).

Perrée's division departed on 26 January 1800, but soon after, Généreux broke her mizzen tops and her main topgallant off Hyères, and had to double back for repairs. The division set sail again on 10 February 1800 and arrived off La Valette only a week later, due to adverse weather. On 18, off Lampedusa, Généreux investigated a strange sail which turned out to be a British ship rejoining two sails on the horizon. Perrée ordered his squadron to flee, but Ville de Marseille was overhauled by the 74-gun HMS Alexander in the next morning, and struck her colours at 8:30.

The rest of the British squadron, comprising the 74-gun HMS Alexander, Northumberland and Foudroyant, and the 32-gun frigate HMS Success, part of Keith's fleet blockading the Malta, continued the chase.

In the afternoon, Perrée spotted two further ships, HMS Audacious and Lion, in the North-North-West; he ordered his corvettes to adjust course, Sans-Pareille sustaining a broadsite from Alexander in the process, and gave liberty of maneuver to his captains. Généreux headed East, but found herself surrounded from all directions. Perrée had anchors, boats and forage supplies throwned overboard, but at 3:15, the frigate HMS Success audaciously intercepted and engaged the much more powerful Généreux, hoping to delay her enough for the British ships of the line to catch up. By 4:30, the British 74-guns had overhauled Généreux and were raking her.

A shot from the first broadside threw splinters into Perrée's left eye, temporarily blinding him. Remaining on deck, he called to his crew "Ce n'est rien, mes amis, continuons notre besogne" ("It is nothing, my friends, continue with your work") and gave orders for the ship to be turned, when a cannonball from the second broadside from Success tore his right leg off at the thigh. Perrée collapsed unconscious on the deck. Généreux continued to resist until 5:30, when, overpowered, she struck her colours.

Perrée died of his wounds in the evening. On Horatio Nelson's orders, he was interred in Saint Lucy church in the Dominican convent of Syracuse.

== Notes and references ==
=== Bibliography ===
- Bradford, Ernle (1999) [1977]. Nelson: The Essential Hero. Wordsworth Military Library. ISBN 1-84022-202-6.
- Granier, Hubert (1998). Histoire des Marins français 1789–1815. illustrations by Alain Coz. Marines éditions. ISBN 2-909675-41-6.
- Guérin, Léon (1857). Histoire maritime de France (in French). Vol. 6. Dufour et Mulat.
- Hennequin, Joseph François Gabriel (1835). Biographie maritime ou notices historiques sur la vie et les campagnes des marins célèbres français et étrangers (in French). Vol. 2. Paris: Regnault éditeur.
- James, William (2002) [1827]. The Naval History of Great Britain, Volume 3, 1800–1805. Conway Maritime Press. ISBN 0-85177-907-7.
- Levot, Prosper (1866). Les gloires maritimes de la France: notices biographiques sur les plus célèbres marins (in French). Bertrand.
- Troude, Onésime-Joachim (1867). Batailles navales de la France (in French). Vol. 3. Challamel ainé.

=== External links ===
- Jean Baptiste Perree
