= French brig Hazard (1788) =

18-gun brig (1787–1796)

History

France
- Name: Hazard (Note: The term is now written "Hasard", and the ship is sometimes referred to under this modern spelling rather than the Ancien Régime spelling. For instance, Roche writes the name of the ship "Hazard", but names the class as "Hasard".)
- Namesake: Randomness
- Builder: Bayonne
- Laid down: October 1787
- Launched: January 1788
- Commissioned: April 1788
- Fate: Wrecked on 28 October 1796

General characteristics Roche, Dicitonnaire des Bâtiments, p.238
- Class & type: Hazard-class brig
- Displacement: 180 ton (French)
- Length: 27.3 m (89 ft 7 in)
- Beam: 7.8 m (25 ft 7 in)
- Draught: 3.4 m (11 ft 2 in)
- Armament: 14 × 6-pounder guns; 4 × 4-pounder guns

Hazard was an 18-gun brig of the French Navy, lead ship of her class.

== Career ==
Hazard was launched in Bayonne in January 1788, and commissioned in April of the same year. After commissioning, she sailed to Rocheford, from where she departed in a squadron bound for Brest, further composed of the frigates Gracieuse, Néréide and Courageuse, her sister-ships Lutin and Espoir.

In 1790, she cruised off Smyrna and in the Aegean Sea under Lieutenant de Panat, returning from Smyrna to Toulon by way of Methoni.

She later was part of the Middle Eastern station under sub-Lieutenant Mauric. On 16 April 1792, still under Mauric, by then promoted to lieutenant, she cruised from Milo to Toulon, and conducted a mission to Tunis, before returning to Toulon on 21 October. In June 1793, she was at Ajaccio.

On 22 October 1793 Hazard was part of a five-vessel squadron under the command of Jean-Baptiste Perrée. In addition to Mignonne, the squadron included the frigates Melpomene, Minerve, and Fortunée, and Mignonne. They encountered the 64-gun third rate HMS Agamemnon, under the command of Captain Horatio Nelson. Agamemnon and Fortunée engaged in an inconclusive action before the French squadron chose not to pursue the matter and sailed off.

From 11 February 1794, under Lieutenant Racord, she was part of the Villefranche naval station; she returned to Toulon on 26 July.

On 1 March 1795, under the command of Lieutenant Leduc, Hazard cruised in the Ligurian Sea with the squadron of Toulon. She took part in the Battle of Cape Noli, and returned to Toulon on 24 March.

In September 1794, Hazard and sailed in consort with the frigate Alceste, under Captain Perrée, for a commerce raiding cruise in the Mediterranean. The division returned to Toulon on 10 October.

== Fate ==
On 25 October 1796, (Note: Both Roche and Winfield & Roberts say 28 October.) under Lieutenant Bassière, Hazard was wrecked on the Moines reef off Île Saint-Honorat, Alpes-Maritimes. The court-martial of Lieutenant Bassière for the loss of his ship found him guilty. The court sentenced him to a six-month prison term barred him from all command for three years.
