= List of ship launches in 1788 =

The list of ship launches in 1788 includes a chronological list of some ships launched in 1788.

Date	Ship	Class	Builder	Location	Country	Notes
21 January	Expédition	Expédition-class brig-aviso	Benjamin Dubois	Saint-Malo	Kingdom of France	For French Navy.
24 January	Moselle	Gabarre		Bayonne	Kingdom of France	For French Navy.
26 January	Curieux	Expédition-class brig-aviso	Benjamin Dubois	Saint-Malo	Kingdom of France	For French Navy.
January	Hazard	Hazard-class brig		Bayonne	Kingdom of France	For French Navy.
23 February	Dick	West Indiaman	Peter Everitt Mestaer	Rotherhithe	Great Britain	For Q. Dick.
23 February	Epervier	Hazard-class brig	Benjamin Dubois	Saint-Malo	Kingdom of France	For French Navy.
23 February	Sans Souci	Expédition-class brig-aviso	Benjamin Dubois	Saint-Malo	Kingdom of France	For French Navy.
February	Lutin	Hazard-class brig		Bayonne	Kingdom of France	For French Navy.
27 March	Bellona	Fifth rate	Antonio Chiribiri	Venice	Republic of Venice	For Venetian Navy.
March	Espoir	Hazard-class brig		Bayonne	Kingdom of France	For French Navy.
8 April	Staaten Generaal	Third rate		Rotterdam	Dutch Republic	For Dutch Navy.
21 April	Cerf	Expédition-class brig-aviso	Benjamin Dubois	Saint-Malo	Kingdom of France	For French Navy.
21 April	Impatient	Expédition-class brig-aviso	Benjamin Dubois	Saint-Malo	Kingdom of France	For French Navy.
26 April	Odin	Prindsesse Sophia Frederica-class ship of the line		Copenhagen	Denmark-Norway	For Dano-Norwegian Navy.
April	Eveillé	Hazard-class brig		Bayonne	Kingdom of France	For French Navy.
6 May	Aglaé	Frigate		Brest	Kingdom of France	For French Navy.
7 May	Bienvenue	Sixth rate	Gouet & Deros	Havre de Grâce	Kingdom of France	For French Navy.
7 May	Prokhor	Aziia-class ship of the line	M. D. Portnov	Arkhangelsk	Russia	For Imperial Russian Navy.
7 May	Pomoshchnyi	Briachislav-class frigate	M. D. Portnov	Arkhangelsk	Russia	For Imperial Russian Navy.
7 May	Sysoi Velikii	Iaroslav-class ship of the line	M. D. Portnov	Arkhangelsk	Russia	For Imperial Russian Navy.
8 May	Maksim Ispovednik	Iaroslav-class ship of the line	M. D. Portnov	Arkhangelsk	Russia	For Imperial Russian Navy.
8 May	Neva	Cutter	Pospelov	Saint Petersburg	Russia	For Imperial Russian Navy.
8 May	Stashnyi	Bomb vessel	S. Durakin	Saint Petersburg	Russia	For Imperial Russian Navy.
8 May	Volkhov	Sixth rate	M. Sarychev	Saint Petersburg	Russia	For Imperial Russian Navy.
14 May	Letuchii	Cutter	D. Masalsky	Saint Petersburg	Russia	For Imperial Russian Navy.
20 May	Pobeditel	Bomb vessel	D. Masalsky	Saint Petersburg	Russia	For Imperial Russian Navy.
21 May	America	Téméraire-class ship of the line		Brest	Kingdom of France	For French Navy.
21 May	Apollon	Téméraire-class ship of the line		Rochefort	Kingdom of France	For French Navy.
24 May	Nadyozhnyi	Cutter	Vasily Vlasov	Saint Petersburg	Russia	For Imperial Russian Navy.
24 May	Schastlivyi	Cutter		Kronstadt	Russia	For Imperial Russian Navy.
16 June	Thétis	Nymphe-class frigate		Brest	Kingdom of France	For French Navy.
20 June	Alliantie	Frigate		Amsterdam	Dutch Republic	For Dutch Navy.
20 June	San Telmo	Third Rate		Bilbao	Spain	For Spanish Navy.
June	Agile	Galiot			Republic of Venice	For Venetian Navy.
June	Azzardo	Galiot			Republic of Venice	For Venetian Navy.
4 July	Prince	London-class ship of the line		Woolwich Dockyard	Great Britain	For Royal Navy.
5 July	Glory	Duke-class ship of the line		Plymouth Dockyard	Great Britain	For Royal Navy.
21 July	Venus	Whaler	William Barnard	Deptford	Great Britain	For Alexander & Benjamin Champion.
27 July	Amazzone	Galiot			Republic of Venice	For Venetian Navy.
30 July	Diana	Galiot			Republic of Venice	For Venetian Navy.
2 August	Dvenadtsat Apostolov	Ches'ma-class ship of the line	Jonathan Coleman	Saint Petersburg	Russia	For Imperial Russian Navy.
2 August	Sviatoi Ravnoapostolnyi Knyaz Vladimir	Ches'ma-class ship of the line	D. Masalsky	Saint Petersburg	Russia	For Imperial Russian Navy.
2 August	Three Sisters	West Indiaman	John Perry	Blackwall	Great Britain	For Mr. Mangles.
7 August	Commerce de Marseille	Océan-class ship of the line		Toulon	Kingdom of France	For French Navy.
10 August	Ioann Bogoslov	Fifth rate	I. V. Dolzhnikov	Rogozhskaya	Russia	For Imperial Russian Navy.
10 August	Pyotr Apostol	Fifth rate	I. V. Dolzhnikov	Rogozhskaya	Russia	For Imperial Russian Navy.
1 September	Letuchaia	Sixth rate	D. Masalsky	Saint Petersburg	Russia	For Imperial Russian Navy.
2 September	Duquesne	Téméraire-class ship of the line		Toulon	Kingdom of France	For French Navy.
16 September	Royal George	First rate	John Nelson	Chatham Dockyard	Great Britain	For Royal Navy.
16 September	Tourville	Téméraire-class ship of the line		Lorient	Kingdom of France	For French Navy.
16 October	Lebre	Sixth rate		Lisbon	Portugal	For Portuguese Navy.
16 October	Warley	East Indiaman	Perry & Co.	Blackwall	Great Britain	For British East India Company.
24 October	Edmund and George	West Indiaman	Peter Everitt Mestaer	Rotherhithe	Great Britain	For J. Christie.
27 October	Duke of Buccleugh	East Indiaman	Randall	Rotherhithe	Great Britain	For British East India Company.
30 October	Duguay-Trouin	Téméraire-class ship of the line		Brest	Kingdom of France	For French Navy.
30 October	Ocean	East Indiaman	Wells	Deptford	Great Britain	For British East India Company.
31 October	Uranie	Fifth rate	Charles-Jean-François Segondat-Duvernet	Lorient	Kingdom of France	For French Navy.
20 December	San Francisco de Paula	Third rate		Carthagena	Spain	For Spanish Navy.
Unknown date	Amacree	Slave ship		Liverpool	Great Britain	For private owner.
Unknown date	Britannia	Merchantman		Scotland	Great Britain	For Hunter & Co.
Unknown date	Britannia	Brig		New Brunswick	(Kingdom of Great Britain) Province of Quebec	For private owner.
Unknown date	Candia	East Indiaman		Rotterdam	Dutch Republic	For Dutch East India Company.
Unknown date	Chatham	Survey ship	King	Dover	Great Britain	For Royal Navy.
Unknown date	Cyrene	Full-rigged ship		Bombay	India	For Bombay Pilot Service.
Unknown date	Dandy	Schooner	Nicholas Bools	Bridport	Great Britain	For Mr. Akin.
Unknown date	Good Intent	Sloop	Nicholas Bools	Bridport	Great Britain	For John Bagwall, Nicholas Bools, Joshua Gundry and Thomas Swain.
Unknown date	Espiègle	Hazard-class brig		Bayonne	Kingdom of France	For French Navy.
Unknown date	Haasje	Packet ship		Amsterdam	Dutch Republic	For Dutch East India Company.
Unknown date	Iona	Sixth rate			Russia	For Imperial Russian Navy.
Unknown date	Margaret	Sloop	Nicholas Bools	Bridport	Great Britain	For Knight & Co.
Unknown date	Marsouin	Sixth rate		Bayonne	Kingdom of France	For French Navy.
Unknown date	Martha	Slave ship		Liverpool	Great Britain	For R. Fisher.
Unknown date	Myrtle	Merchantman	John Brockbank	Lancaster	Great Britain	For private owner.
Unknown date	North West America	Merchantman			Great Britain	For private owner.
Unknown date	Nuestra Señora de la Soledad	Fifth rate		Carthagena	Spain	For Spanish Navy.
Unknown date	Pieter Florisz	Third rate			Dutch Republic	For Dutch Navy.
Unknown date	Plover	Merchantman		Liverpool	Great Britain	For private owner.
Unknown date	Pomona	Brigantine	Nicholas Bools	Bridport	Great Britain	For Nicholas Bools and William Rodden.
Unknown date	Prince William	Merchantman	William Rowe	Newcastle upon Tyne	Great Britain	For private owner.
Unknown date	Prins Frederik Willem	Third rate		Amsterdam	Dutch Republic	For Dutch Navy.
Unknown date	Prosperity	Merchantman		Strangford	Ireland	For private owner.
Unknown date	Ranger	Sloop	Nicholas Bools	Bridport	Great Britain	For Daniel Vivian and Richard Vivian.
Unknown date	Ross	Cutter	Nicholas Bools	Bridport	Great Britain	For HM Customs.
Unknown date	Royal Charlotte	East Indiaman		Northfleet	Great Britain	For private owner.
Unknown date	Rozhdestvo Bogorodisty	Bomb vessel			Russia	For Imperial Russian Navy.
Unknown date	Sally	Sloop	Nicholas Bools	Bridport	Great Britain	For George French.
Unknown date	Serin	Hazard-class brig		Bayonne	Kingdom of France	For French Navy.
Unknown date	Sibilla	Fifth rate		Castellammare del Golfo	Kingdom of Sicily	For Royal Sicilian Navy.
Unknown date	Spiridon Trimifiiskii	Bomb vessel			Russia	For Imperial Russian Navy.
Unknown date	Star	Brig of war		Vlissingen	Dutch Republic	For Dutch Navy.
Unknown date	Tweed	Brig		Bombay	India	For Bombay Pilot Service.
Unknown date	Wilding	West Indiaman		Liverpool	Great Britain	For Moses Benson.
Unknown date	No. 2 chain boat	Chain boat	Batson	Limehouse	Great Britain	For Royal Navy.
Unknown date	Name unknown	Merchantman		South Shields	Great Britain	For private owner.
