= Sir Edward Hamilton (1800 ship) =

Merchant ship launched at Rotherhithe in 1800

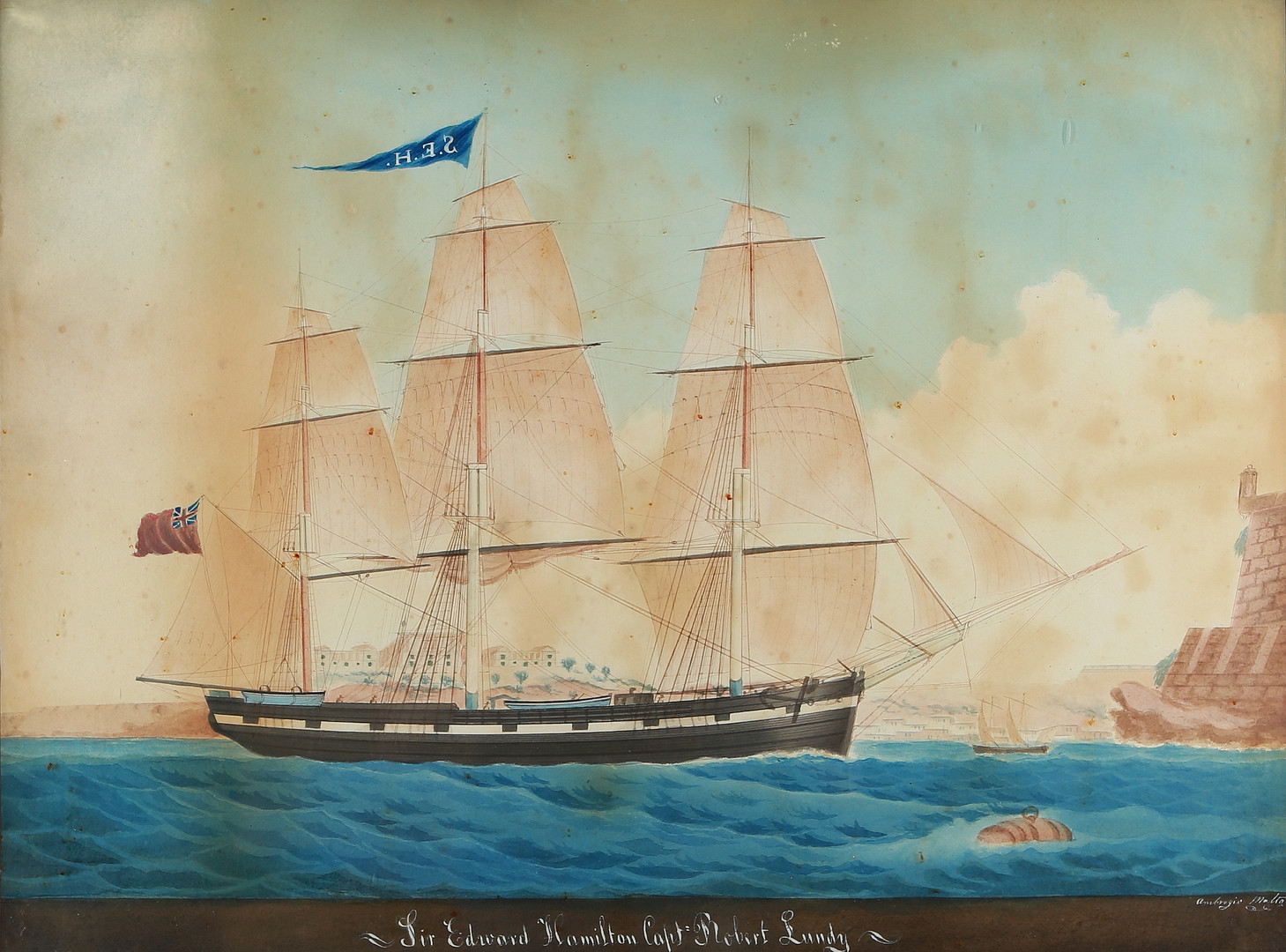
- Sir Edward Hamilton, Capt Robert Lundy approaching Malta

History

Great Britain
- Name: Sir Edward Hamilton
- Namesake: Sir Edward Hamilton, 1st Baronet
- Builder: Peter Everitt Mestaer, King and Queen Shipyard, Rotherhithe
- Launched: 21 November 1800
- Fate: Wrecked 2 December 1853

General characteristics
- Tons burthen: 495, or 49571/94, or 500 (bm)
- Complement: 35
- Armament: 1800:12 × 6-pounder guns; 1810:12 × 6-pounder guns

Sir Edward Hamilton was a merchant ship launched at Rotherhithe in 1800. The British East India Company (EIC) chartered her in 1800 to bring rice from Bengal. She then proceeded to sail as a West Indiaman and later across the Atlantic, finally to the Baltic. She grounded in December 1853 and was so damaged that apparently she never sailed again.

== Career ==
Weather-induced crop failures in Britain in 1799 and 1800 forced the British Government to import rice from Bengal to counter popular unrest. The wheat harvests of 1799 and 1800 were about one-half and three-quarters of the average, respectively. The price of bread rose sharply, leading to bread riots; some of rioters invoked the French Revolution.

Because the British East India Company (EIC) had a legal monopoly on all trade between Britain and India, the Government had to have the EIC engage the transport vessels. The EIC chartered 28 vessels, Sir Edward Hamilton among them.

Captain Andrew Robertson acquired a letter of marque on 29 November 1800. He sailed from Portsmouth on 9 January 1801, bound for Bengal. Sir Edward Hamilton arrived at Calcutta on 26 May. Homeward bound, she was at Diamond Harbour on 1 September, Kedgeree on 15 September, and the Cape on 23 December. She reached St Helena on 28 January 1802 and arrived back at Portsmouth on 30 March.

Year	Master	Owner	Trade	Source & notes
1803	Robertson; Dommett	Anderson; Curling & Co.	London–Bengal; London–Jamaica	LR
1810	G.Bell	Curling & Co.	London–Jamaica	LR
1820	G.Bell	Curling & Co.	London–Jamaica	LR; small repairs 1812 & bends 1817
1830	J.Hall; R.Lundy	Curling & Co. T. Ward	London–Jamaica; Hull–Quebec	LR; bends 1817 & damages repaired 1829

In 1830 a new owner, T. Ward, of Hull, changed Sir Edward Hamilton's homeport to Hull. She started sailing between Hull and Quebec.

On 2 May 1833 Maybud sprang a leak and her crew abandoned her in the North Sea while on a voyage from Sunderland, County Durham to Aldeburgh. Sir Edward Hamilton rescued the crew. (Note: Maybud, of 59 tons (bm), J. Walker master and owner, had been launched in 1825. She was a Lynn-based coaster.)

Year	Master	Owner	Trade	Source & notes
1835	R.Lundy	T.Ward	Hull–America	LR; large repair 1831
1840	R.Lundy	T.Ward	Hull	LR; large repair 1831
1845				LR – Not listed
1853	T.Dobson	T.Ward	Hull–Baltic	LR; large repair 1831 & small repair 1848

== Fate ==
On 31 May 1853 Sir Edward Hamilton and Canton were in company while sailing from Hull to Saint Petersburg when they grounded on Anholt. They were assisted off and were to proceed on their voyages. (Note: Canton, of 376 tons (bm), Dunkerley, master, had been launched in Hull in 1834.)

Sir Edward Hamilton was returning from Saint Petersburg when she was driven ashore on 2 December 1853 at Flamborough Head. She was refloated on 4 December and taken in to Bridlington in a severely leaky condition. Part of her cargo and stores were removed and her masts cut down. Still, she filled with water at every tide.
