= HMS Alert (1793) =

Sloop of the Royal Navy

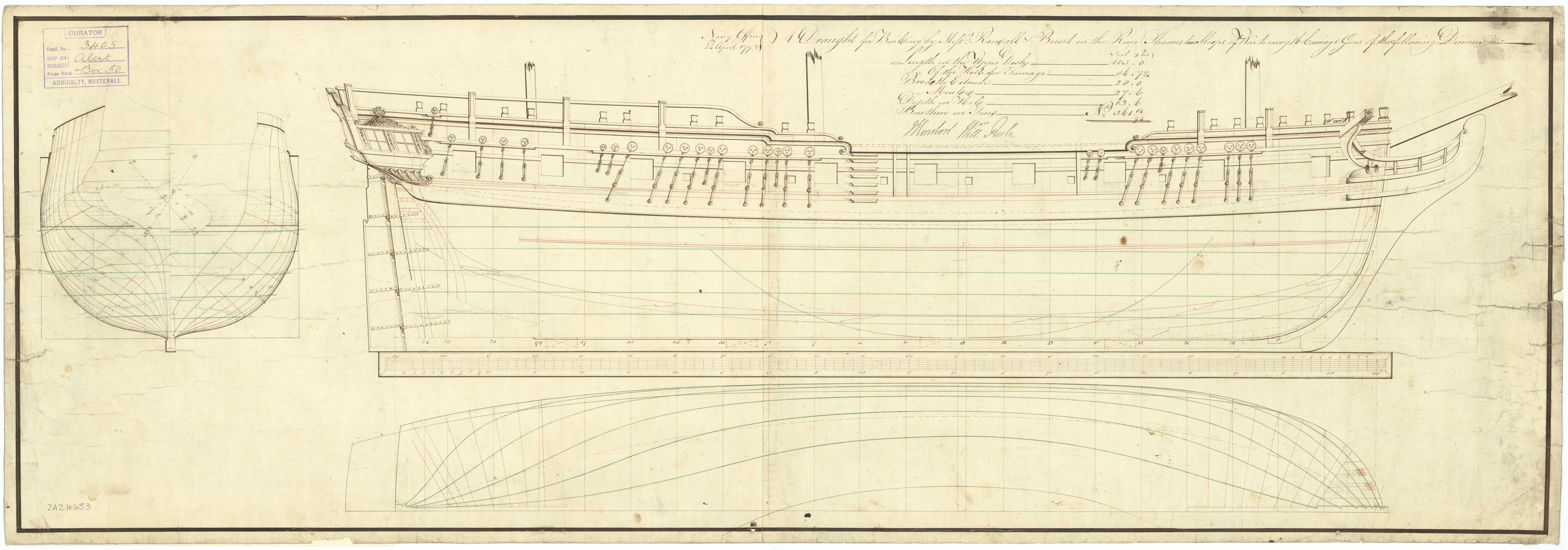
- Alert

History

Great Britain
- Name: HMS Alert
- Ordered: 18 February 1793
- Builder: John Randall & Co., Rotherhithe
- Laid down: April 1793
- Launched: 8 October 1793
- Commissioned: October 1793
- Captured: 14 May 1794

France
- Name: Alerte
- Acquired: By capture May 1794
- Fate: Destroyed 23 August 1794

General characteristics
- Class & type: Pylades-class ship-sloop
- Displacement: 280 tons (French)
- Tons burthen: 36516/94 (bm)
- Length: 105 ft 3 in (32.1 m) (overall); 86 ft 9 1/2 in (26.5 m) (keel)
- Beam: 28 ft 1 1/2 in (8.6 m)
- Depth of hold: 13 ft 6 in (4.1 m)
- Propulsion: Sail
- Complement: HMS: 125; French service: 125–130
- Armament: HMS: 16 × 6-pounder guns + 4 × ½-pounder swivel guns; French service: Unchanged

HMS Alert was launched in 1793 for the Royal Navy. In May 1794 the French Navy captured her and took her into service as Alerte. A few months later the Royal Navy destroyed her.

== Career ==
Commander Charles Smyth commissioned her in October 1793. He then sailed for Nova Scotia in May 1794. Alert was off the coast of Ireland when she had the misfortune to encounter the 40-gun French frigate Unité.

At daybreak on 14 May Alert was at 46°35′N 15°15′W when she sighted three vessels. These edged towards Alert, as she edged away, and the strangers did not respond to Alert's signals. At about 10:45 another three vessels appeared. The strange vessels signaled to each other, and most sailed away, but one remained in chase. Then at noon some vessels appeared off Alert's bow and Smyth decided to engage his pursuer to try to cripple her and so escape. Alert and the frigate closed at about 1:45pm and an action commenced after Smyth declined an invitation to strike. By 3:30 Alert had lost three men killed and nine wounded, her rigging and sails were shredded, and she had taken shots between wind and water. At this point Smyth struck.

The French took her into service as Alerte. Some four months later, on 23 August, HMS Flora, Captain John Borlase Warren, and HMS Arethusa, Captain Sir Edward Pellew, chased two French corvettes, Alerte and Espion into Audierne Bay. The two corvettes anchored off the Gamelle Rocks, but when they saw that the British intended to capture them, their captains got under weigh and ran their vessels aground below the guns of three shore batteries. The corvettes continued to exchange fire with the two British frigates until early evening, when the corvettes' masts fell. At that point many of the French crewmen abandoned their vessels and went ashore. Warren sent in the boats from both Flora and Arethusa, all under Pellew's command, with orders to set fire or otherwise destroy the two corvettes. Pellew went in and took possession of both, but determined that he could not extract the wounded. Pellew therefore left the vessels, which he determined were bilged and scuttled, with rocks having pierced their bottoms, and left with 52 prisoners. Pellew estimated that Alerte had suffered 20 to 30 men killed and wounded, and that Espion had lost more.

French records indicate that Alerte, which had been under the command of lieutenant de vaisseau Passart, had been scuttled and was lost. However, the French Navy was able to refloat Espion, which had been under the command of lieutenant de vaisseau Magendie. (Note: Quintin gives the name Espoir instead of Espion, apparently in error. A Hasard-class brig Espoir was in commission at the time, but she was not captured on 2–3 March 1795.)
