= French frigate Sibylle (1801) =

History

France
- Name: Sibylle
- Namesake: Sibyl
- Builder: Toulon
- Laid down: April 1790
- Launched: 30 August 1791
- In service: May 1792
- Captured: 17 June 1794

General characteristics
- Class & type: Frigate
- Armament: 40 guns

Sibylle was a 40-gun frigate of the French Navy. She was built as Minerva in Naples, and surrendered to France on 14 July 1801.

In September 1801, she was commissioned for the Toulon squadron, and in December, she sailed to Toulon under Commander Jean-Jacques Magendie. On the 24 of that month, she joined French service as Sibylle.

In 1802, she served off Saint-Domingue in a squadron also comprising, Duquesne and Intrépide, and commanded by Pierre Maurice Julien de Quérangal.

Sibylle was returned to Naples on 5 May 1803.

== Sources and references ==
- Roche, Jean-Michel (2005). Dictionnaire des bâtiments de la flotte de guerre française de Colbert à nos jours 1 1671 - 1870. ISBN 978-2-9525917-0-6. OCLC 165892922.
