= Robert (1793 ship) =

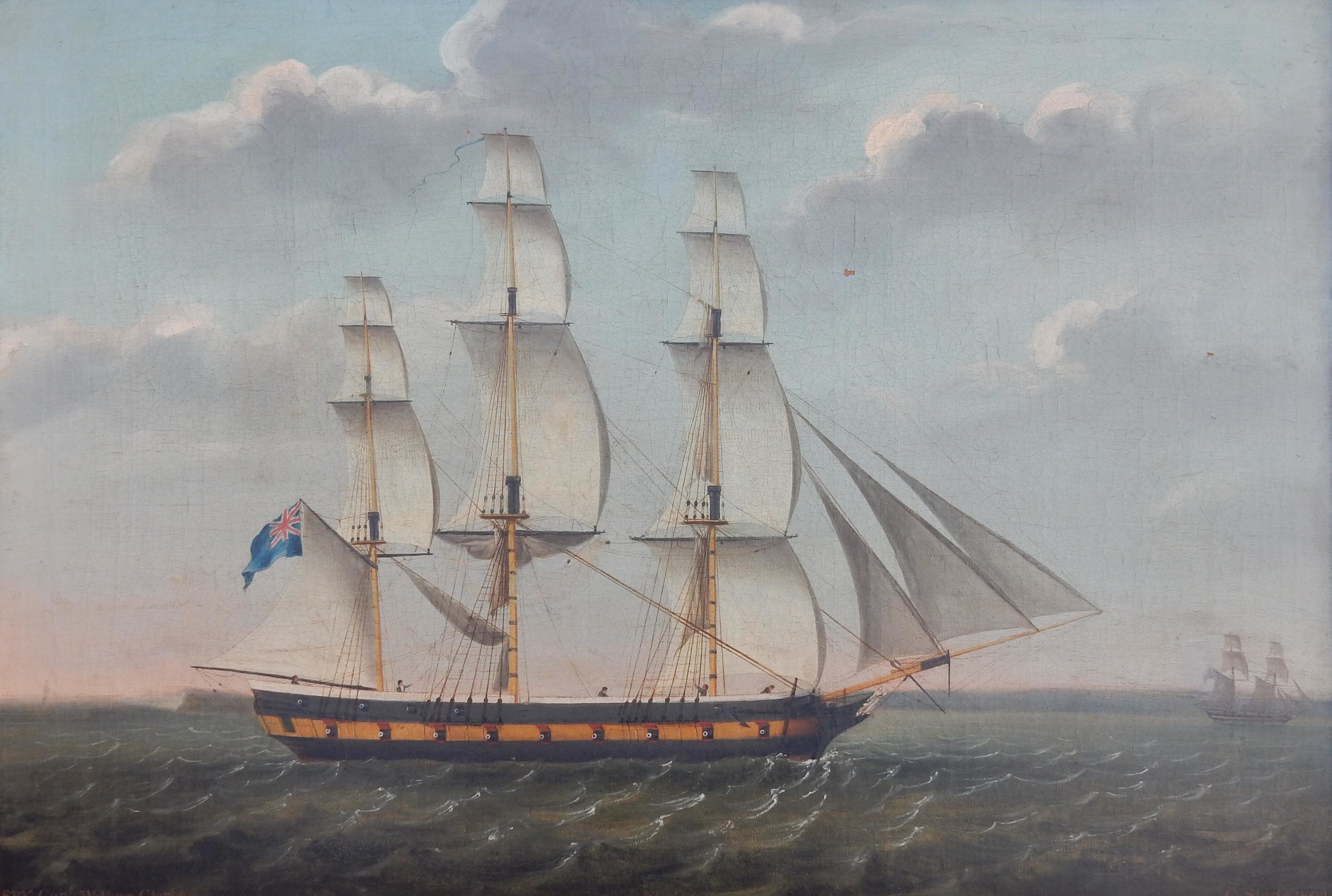
- Spy, Captain Welham Clarke, off Wight; C. Slade, 1803

History

France
- Name: Robert
- Builder: Nantes
- Launched: 1793
- Captured: 13 June 1793

Great Britain
- Name: HMS Espion
- Acquired: 13 June 1793 by capture
- Captured: 22 July 1794

France
- Name: Espion
- Acquired: 22 July 1794 by capture
- Captured: 4 March 1795

Great Britain
- Name: HMS Spy
- Acquired: 4 March 1795 by capture
- Captured: Sold 7 September 1801

UK
- Name: Spy
- Owner: 1802:James Swanzy; 1803:Hurry & Co.
- Acquired: 1801 by purchase
- Captured: mid-1805

General characteristics
- Displacement: 400 tons (French)
- Tons burthen: Robert: 300 tons (French; "of load"); HMS:27583/94, or 294,<refe name=LoM/> or 295, or 300, (bm)
- Length: 86 ft 5 1/2 in (26.4 m) (overall); 69 ft 6 3/8 in (21.2 m) (keel)
- Beam: 27 ft 3 3/4 in (8.3 m)
- Depth of hold: 13 ft 0 in (4.0 m)
- Propulsion: Sail
- Complement: Robert: 100-170; HMS Espion: 120; Espion: 135-146, but 140 at capture; HMS Spy: 120; Spy 1803: 45; Spy 1805: 107
- Armament: Robert: 18 × 6-pounder guns + 8-12 × 1-pounder swivel guns; HMS Espion: 16 × 16-pounder guns; Espion:18 × 6-pounder guns; HMS Spy:16 × 6-pounder guns; Spy 1803: 24 × 12 & 4-pounder guns; Spy 1805:6 × 6-pounder + 10 × 12-pounder guns; Spy 1805: 8 × 4-pounder guns + 18 × 18-pounder carronades + 2 × swivel guns

Robert was a 16-gun French privateer corvette launched in 1793 at Nantes. The British captured her in 1793 and named her HMS Espion. The French recaptured her in 1794 and took her into service as Espion. The British recaptured her in 1795, but there being another Espion in service by then, the British renamed their capture HMS Spy. She served under that name until the Navy sold her in 1801. Spy then became a slave ship in the triangular trade in enslaved people, a merchantman to South America, and privateer again. The French captured her in mid-1805 and sent her into Guadeloupe.

== Robert ==
Perrotin & Son commissioned Robert in Nantes in February 1793; on 15 February Captain François-Marie Pied acquired the 8th letter of marque for the war with England issued at Nantes.

She recaptured two French vessels while on her first cruise. One was the East Indiaman Trajan, Captain Joseph Boudel, which was coming from Pondicherry. Thetis had captured her. Robert sent her into Bordeaux. The other vessel was Titus, which an English privateer had captured. Robert sent her too into Bordeaux, where her cargo was sold.

Captain Jacques Moreau replaced Boudel. Robert sailed from Bordeaux on 3 June. It was on this cruise that the British captured her.

The frigate HMS Syren, Captain John Manley, captured Robert on 13 June 1793 in the Bay of Biscay after a chase of 28 hours. One report gave Robert 22 guns and a complement of 200 men, but all other reports trimmed this to 16 carriage and eight swivel guns, and 170 men. Robert had been out three days from Bordeaux, had captured nothing.

== HMS Espion ==
The Royal Navy commissioned HMS Espion in March 1794 under the command of Commander William Hugh Kittoe, for the Channel. On 22 July 1794 Tamise and two other French frigates captured Espion south of the Isles of Scilly. Kittoe was so outnumbered and outgunned that he struck without resistance. The French Navy took her into service as the corvette Espion.

== Espion ==
On 23 August 1794, HMS Flora, Captain Sir John Borlase Warren, and HMS Arethusa, Captain Sir Edward Pellew, chased two French corvettes, Alerte and Espion into Audierne Bay. The two corvettes anchored off the Gamelle Rocks, but when they saw that the British intended to capture them, their captains got under weigh and ran their vessels aground below the guns of three shore batteries. The corvettes continued to exchange fire with the two British frigates until early evening, when the corvettes' masts fell. At that point many of the French crewmen abandoned their vessels and went ashore. Warren sent in the boats from both Flora and Arethusa, all under Pellew's command, with orders to set fire or otherwise destroy the two corvettes. Pellew went in and took possession of both, but determined that he could not extract the wounded. Pellew therefore left the vessels, which he determined were bilged and scuttled, with rocks having pierced their bottoms, and left with 52 prisoners. Pellew estimated that Alerte had suffered 20 to 30 men killed and wounded, and that Espion had lost more.

Alerte was a total loss, but the French Navy was able to refloat Espion, which had been under the command of lieutenant de vaisseau Magendie. (Note: Quintin & Quintin give the name Espoir instead of Espion, apparently in error. A Hasard-class brig Espoir was in commission at the time, but she was not captured on 2–3 March 1795.) She then spent time in the Brest roadstead before cruising in the Atlantic and returning to Brest.

On 4 March 1795, the British frigate Lively captured Espion about 13 leagues off Ushant. Espion was armed with eighteen 6-pounder guns and had a crew of 140 men. She was five days out of Brest on a cruise. Lively was under the command of Captain George Burlton, acting in the absence of Captain Viscount Lord Garlies, who was sick on shore, commanded Lively.

Nine days later, Lively captured the French corvette Tourterelle, and two vessels that Tourterelle had been escorting, which had been prizes to Espion.

== HMS Spy ==
As the Royal Navy by this time had another HMS Espion, the Navy took Espion into service on 20 May 1795 and renamed her Spy. She then was at Portsmouth fitting out until November. She was recommissioned under J. Walton. In January 1796 Commander James Young assumed command for The Downs station. A year later Commander William Grosvenor replaced Young, and remained in command until December 1799. In August 1797 Spy recaptured four vessels. She appears to have spent her time escorting convoys in the Channel. For instance, on 5 March 1799 Spy passed Plymouth, escorting a convoy of coasters westward.

Commander Charles Hay replaced Grosvenor. On 14 August 1800, Spy left Plymouth with the London trader George and Francis, Hoskins, master, under convoy for London.

The Principal Officers and Commissioners of His Majesty's Navy offered the "Spy 275 tons burthen" for sale at Plymouth on 7 September 1801. She sold that day for £710.

== Mercantile service ==
The supplement to Lloyd's Register for 1802 showed Spy, with Vaughn, master, and "Swansea", as owner, having undergone a refit in 1802. Her trade was London-Africa. A database of enslaving voyages from London showed Spy, Robert Vaughn, master, and James Swanzy, owner, made one voyage in 1803 carrying captives from the Gold Coast to British Guiana. Spy sailed from London on 8 August 1802. She acquired captives first at Cape Coast Castle and then at Anomabu, which was 16 kilometres away. She left Africa on 18 January 1802 and arrived at Demerara in March with some 300 captives. She arrived back at London on 13 May.

Year	Master	Owner	Trade	Source
1802	R.Vaughn	Swanzy	London–Africa	RS; large repair 1802
1802	Vaughn	Swansea	London–Africa	LR
1803	Vaughn; Clarke	Swansea; Hurry & Co.	London–Africa; London–South Seas	LR

The entry in Lloyd's Register for 1802 carried over to 1803, but an addendum to the entry in the 1803 Lloyd's Register noted that Spy had a new master, Clarke, and new owner, Hurry & Co. Her trade became the South Seas. Captain Welham Clarke acquired a letter of marque for Spy on 26 July 1803. Spy sailed for the South Seas on 11 September. On 21 December Spy was at Rio de Janeiro with destination "S° Seas". However, she sailed as a merchantman, not a whaler.

On 30 January 1804 she encountered Pacific, Thomas Hopper, master, at 42.81°S 83.18°W. Clarke noted in his log that Pacific had 1300 barrels of sperm oil.

Spy, Clarke, master returned to England on 14 October 1804. At Portsmouth she landed several tons of gold and silver belonging to Mr. Hurry, of Gosport. These were the proceeds of her cargo of manufactures that she had sold to the inhabitants of South America. The bullion was deposited in the Gosport Bank. (Note: The Gosport Bank (aka Jukes, Langley & Jukes) operated between 1803 and 1810, when it failed. It was a provincial bank and issued bank notes.) The next day the bullion, in 100 casks and boxes, traveled in three wagons under strong guard to the Bank of England. The bullion weighed about 10 tons and its value was estimated at £100,000. It included £47,000 in new dollars. She arrived at Gravesend on 26 October with Burrowes, master.

Captain Edward Dyer (or Dwyer), acquired a letter of marque on 14 March 1805. The scale of her armament and the size of her crew signal that she was now a privateer.

On 14 April there arrived at Plymouth Zes Gesusters, DeVries (or DeVrees), master. She had been coming from Lisbon when Spy, Dwyer, master, had detained her.

== Fate ==
Lloyd's List of 2 August 1805 reported that the privateer Spy, of London, Dwyer, master, had been captured and taken into Guadeloupe.

Lloyd's Register continued the entry from the 1803 addendum, including Clarke as master, unchanged until at least 1811. Some sources have Spy engaging in whaling between 1810 and 1813, though the whaling voyages database does not show that. The Register of Shipping for 1805 had an entry for Spy that still showed Clarke as master, and Hurry & Co. as owner. It gave Spy's trade as London-Madeira.
