= HMS Mercury (1779) =

Enterprise-class Royal Navy frigate

- HMS Mercury cutting out a French gunboat from Rovigno, 1 April 1809

History

Great Britain
- Name: HMS Mercury
- Ordered: 22 January 1778
- Builder: Peter Everitt Mestaer, King and Queen Shipyard, Rotherhithe
- Laid down: 25 March 1778
- Launched: 9 December 1779
- Completed: By 24 February 1780
- Fate: Broken up in January 1814

General characteristics
- Class & type: 28-gun Enterprise-class sixth-rate frigate
- Tons burthen: 60512/94 (bm)
- Length: 120 ft 9 3/4 in (36.8 m) (overall); 99 ft 10.5 in (30.4 m) (keel)
- Beam: 33 ft 9 in (10.3 m)
- Depth of hold: 11 ft 0 1/2 in (3.4 m)
- Sail plan: Full-rigged ship
- Complement: 200
- Armament: Upper deck: 24 × 9-pounder guns; QD: 4 × 6-pounder guns + 4 × 18-pounder carronades; Fc: 2 × 18-pounder carronades; 12 × swivel guns

HMS Mercury was a 28-gun Enterprise-class sixth-rate frigate of the Royal Navy. She was built during the American War of Independence and serving during the later years of that conflict. She continued to serve during the years of peace and had an active career during the French Revolutionary Wars and most of the Napoleonic Wars, until being broken up in 1814.

== Construction and commissioning ==
Mercury was ordered from Peter Mestaer, at the King and Queen Shipyard, Rotherhithe on the River Thames on 22 January 1778 and was laid down there on 25 March. She was launched on 9 December 1779 and was completed by 24 February 1780 after being fitted out at Deptford Dockyard. £6,805 7s 0d was paid to her builder for her construction, with the total including fitting and coppering subsequently rising to £13,603 8s 0d. Mercury entered service in 1780, having been commissioned in October 1779 under Captain Isaac Prescott.

== American War of Independence and the interwar years ==
Prescott sailed Mercury to Newfoundland in April 1780. On 23 July she returned from a cruise, having, on the 19th, retaken the ship Elizabeth, which the 32-gun American privateer Dean had taken a few days earlier. Elizabeth was of 240 tons burthen, armed with 14 guns but with only 10 crewmen. When first taken she had been sailing from London to Newfoundland with a cargo of salt.

Mercury joined George Johnstone's squadron the following year. Captain William Carlyon took command in May 1781 and sailed Mercury to Hudson Bay. There, on 17 May, he recaptured the cutter HMS Sprightly. On 30 September, Mercury, Rattlesnake, and Jupiter captured the French ship Philippine. (Note: The prize money was remitted from Jamaica, suggesting the capture took place in the Caribbean. French records have the capture occurring in the Antilles.) (Note: Philippine was a French merchant vessel purchased by Bernard & Cie. at Lorient for Lt160,000 and commissioned 11 March 1781 by the French navy. She was fitted out between March and April. She had a crew of 100. French reports indicate that the British treated the crew harshly after they became prisoners.)

In March 1782, Mercury and Jupiter captured the French privateer Bologne. Captain Henry Edwyn Stanhope succeeded Carlyon in September 1782, and paid Mercury off later that year. She was recommissioned under Stanhope in April the following year, and went out to Nova Scotia in June. Commodore Herbert Sawyer took command of the North American Station's base at Halifax in June 1785, and authorized Mercury to escort a merchant vessel to the American port of Boston to collect a shipment of cattle. This marked the first free visit of a British warship to the port since March 1776.

Mercury was again paid off in July 1786 and spent the period between August 1787 and January 1788 undergoing a small repair at Woolwich. After being fitted out there she was recommissioned in May 1788 under Captain Augustus Montgomery, and sailed to the Mediterranean. She returned to Britain and was paid off in 1790.

== French Revolutionary Wars ==
Mercury was not immediately returned to service following the outbreak of war with Revolutionary France, but after being fitted at Portsmouth, re-entered service in early 1796, under the command of Captain George Byng. After time spent at Newfoundland command passed to Captain Thomas Rogers in April 1797. Rogers captured three privateers while serving on the Lisbon station, Benjamin on 5 January 1798, the 16-gun Trois Sœurs on 15 January 1798, and the 12-gun Constance on 25 January 1798.

Benjamin was 20 leagues (97 km) off the Rock of Lisbon when Mercury finally captured her after a chase of 36 hours. Benjamin was pierced for 20 guns, but carried sixteen 4 and 6-pounders, ten of which she threw overboard during the chase. She had a crew of 132 men. Alcmene, Lively and Thalia joined the chase and shared in the capture. Benjamin was a new vessel on her first cruise, during which she had captured the English brig Governor Bruce, on her way to Faro, and a Portuguese schooner. However, a British letter of marque had driven Benjamin off.

Next, Rogers was some 40 leagues (190 km) off Cape Finisterre when he spotted two armed vessels and gave chase. As Mercury got close they separated and he was only able to capture one of them and that after a chase of eight hours. The quarry fired a few shots and then struck. She was the French privateer brig Trois Sœurs. She was pierced for 18 guns but carried sixteen 6-pounders. She was five days out of port on her first cruise. 42 leagues (200 km) off the Burlings. Mercury captured her after a chase of five hours. Constance was pierced for 18 guns but carried only twelve 6 and 9-pounders, and had a crew of 96 men. She was ten days out off Nantes on a cruise of the Western Islands.

Rodgers then took Mercury to Newfoundland in June 1798. After returning to Portsmouth for a refit in early 1799, she went back there in 1799. On 6 October she captured San Joce. On 16 December 1799 she captured Hosprung.

On 24 January 1800, Mercury was 28 leagues (140 km) off Scilly when she recaptured the ship Aimwell. Aimwell, of Whitby, had been sailing from Quebec to London when the French privateer Arriege, of Bordeaux, had captured her on 9 January. On 29 March, Mercury was among the ships that shared in the capture of Courageux. The other captors were Renown, Dragon, Gibraltar, Haerlem, Alexander, Athenian and Salamine.

Mercury captured the French privateer brig Égyptienne on 5 February 1800 off the Isle of Wight. Egyptienne mounted 15 brass guns and had a crew of 66 men. She had sailed from Cherbourg the evening before and had not yet taken any prizes. As she was striking her colours her crew suddenly discharged a volley of small arms fire that slightly wounded one man on Mercury. Apparently Topaze was in company or perhaps in sight at the time.

After spending a period in the English Channel, Mercury then sailed for the Mediterranean in May 1800. She was briefly part of Sir John Borlase Warren's squadron off Cádiz, after which she went on to Alexandria, arriving there on 31 July 1800.

On 5 January 1801, Mercury captured a French tartan, of unknown name, sailing from Marseilles to Cette in ballast. Then the next day, Mercury had greater luck when with her boats she captured 15 vessels of a convoy of 20 vessels. The captures included two ships, four brigs, three bombards, two settees, and four tartans. The convoy was sailing from Cette to Marseilles when Mercury captured three-quarters of it off Minorca. The gunboats escorting the convoy fled as Mercury approached, so she suffered no casualties.

The vessels included the:

- Genoese ship Rhone, with a cargo of salt, brandy, wine, and fruit;
- Genoese ship St. John, with a cargo of wine;
- French brig Maria Josephine, with a cargo of brandy, wheat, and sugar;
- French brig Solide, with a cargo of brandy and wheat;
- French brig Cheri, with a cargo of salt;
- Genoese brig St Carola, with a cargo of wine and brandy;
- Genoese bombard Compte de Grasse, with a cargo of wheat and stock fish;
- French bomb Paste, with a cargo of wine and brandy;
- Genoese bombard St Andre, with a cargo of wheat and sugar;
- French settee Bone, with a cargo of wine;
- French settee Republican, with a cargo of wine;
- French tartan Croisette, with a cargo of wheat;
- French tartan St Ivado Pierre, with a cargo of wheat and staves;
- French tartan Rosaria, with a cargo of wine and bread; and
- French tartan Madona, with a cargo of wheat.

On 20 January 1801, the day after Rogers had safely delivered his prizes to Port Mahon, he was some 40 leagues (190 km) off Sardinia when Mercury captured the French corvette Sans Pareille after a chase of nine hours. She was a French navy corvette under the command of Citoyen Gabriel Renault, Lieutenant de Vaisseau. She carried 18 long brass 9-pounders and two howitzers. The reason she did not resist was that she had a crew of only 15 men. She had sailed from Toulon the day before and was carrying a cargo of shot, arms, medicines, and all manner of other supplies for the French army at Alexandria, Egypt. The Admiralty took Sans Pareille into service as HMS Delight.

On 17 February 1801, Mercury detained the Swedish brig Hoppet, which was sailing in ballast from Tunis to Marseilles, in violation of the British blockaded of France. The next day, Mercury, in company with Mermaid, captured the ship Esperance, which had sailed from Tunis with a cargo of silk, cotton, and other merchandise. Then on 15 May, Mercury and Loire captured the French ship Francois.

Mercury then made an attempt to recapture the 18-gun bomb vessel HMS Bulldog at Ancona on 25 May 1801. (Note: The French had captured Bulldog on 7 February 1801 at Ancona when she entered the port unaware that the French had taken it.) The cutting out party was able to get Bulldog out of the harbour, but then the winds died down just as enemy boats started to arrive. The cutting out party were too few in numbers both to guard the captured prisoners and resist the approaching enemy, and were tired from the row in to board Bulldog. Mercury had drifted too far away to come to the rescue either. The cutting out party therefore abandoned Bulldog. Mercury lost two men killed and four wounded in the attempt; Rogers estimated that the enemy had lost some 20 men killed, wounded and drowned.

On 23 June 1801 boats from Mercury and Corso destroyed the pirate tartane Tigre, of eight 6 and 12-pounder guns and a crew of 60 French and Italians, in the Tremiti Islands. The Royal Marines landed and captured some of the pirates, who had mounted a 4-pounder gun on a hill. Meanwhile, the cutting out party brought out Tigre, together with bales of cotton and other goods that she had taken from vessels she had robbed.

Though the first attempt to recapture Bulldog had failed, a second effort on 16 September 1801, carried out in company with Champion and HMS Santa Dorothea, succeeded. Rogers had received intelligence that Bulldog had left Ancona and was escorting four trabaccolos and a tartane that were carrying cannons, ammunition, and supplies to Egypt. Mercury set out with Champion and they discovered Santa Dorothea already in chase. The convoy took refuge under the guns of batteries at Gallipoli, Apulia. Even so, Champion was able to get close to Bulldog, which struck after receiving several broadsides. Champion was then able to extricate Bulldog from under the batteries. In the meantime, Mercury captured one of the trabaccolos, which was carrying brass mortars, field pieces, and the like. In the engagement, Champion suffered one man killed.

== Napoleonic Wars ==
Mercury was fitted out as a floating battery at Deptford in May 1803, under the command of Captain Duncombe Pleydell-Bouverie. She went on to operate against Spanish shipping in the Eastern Atlantic and captured the Fuerte de Gibraltar on 4 February 1805. Fuerte de Gibraltar was a Spanish lateen-rigged gun-vessel armed with two long 12-pounders, two 16-pound carronades, several swivel guns, and a large quantity of small arms and cutlasses. She and her crew of 59 men were under the command of Lieutenant de fregate Signor Don Ramon Eutate, and had sailed the morning before from Cádiz bound for Algeciras.

Captain Charles Pelly succeeded Bouverie in August 1805 and Mercury returned to Newfoundland in May 1806. On 3 January 1806 HMS Starr recaptured the ships Argo and Adventure, and shared in the recapture of the Good Intent. Starr was off Villa de Conde, Portugal, when she intercepted the vessels, which had been taken from a convoy that Mercury had been escorting from Newfoundland to Portugal, and both of which had been carrying cargoes of fish. Starr sighted Good Intent and signaled Mercury, which recaptured her too. On 5 February, Curieux captured Baltidore, which was the privateer that had captured Good Intent.

In June 1807 James Alexander Gordon took command and sailed Mercury into the Mediterranean to operate off the Southern Spanish coast. In the action of 4 April 1808, Mercury, in company with HMS Alceste and HMS Grasshopper, attacked a Spanish convoy off Rota, destroying two of the escorts and driving many of the merchant vessels ashore. They captured seven more vessels subsequently, which the marines and sailors of the British ships sailed back out to sea.

In November 1808, command passed to Henry Duncan, who took her into the Adriatic Sea to participate in the Adriatic campaign of 1804–1814. On 30 December, Mercury and Alceste captured the Hereux and the Spirito Santo.

Mercury was in action with HMS Spartan and HMS Amphion at Pesaro on 23 April and at Cesenatico on 2 May. In the attack on Pesaro, which the British bombarded after the commandant refused to surrender, the British captured 13 small coasting vessels. Due to the lack of resistance the British suffered no casualties. One civilian died by accident. Mercury grounded during the attack on Cesenatico but in a position where she could bring her guns to bear on the town. She was floated off without injury. In the attack the British captured and spiked the two 24-pounder guns of a battery that had fired on them and captured 12 vessels, all without suffering any casualties.

In June Mercury sent in her boats to destroy a number of trabaccolos and other vessels on the beach at Rotti, near Manfredonia.

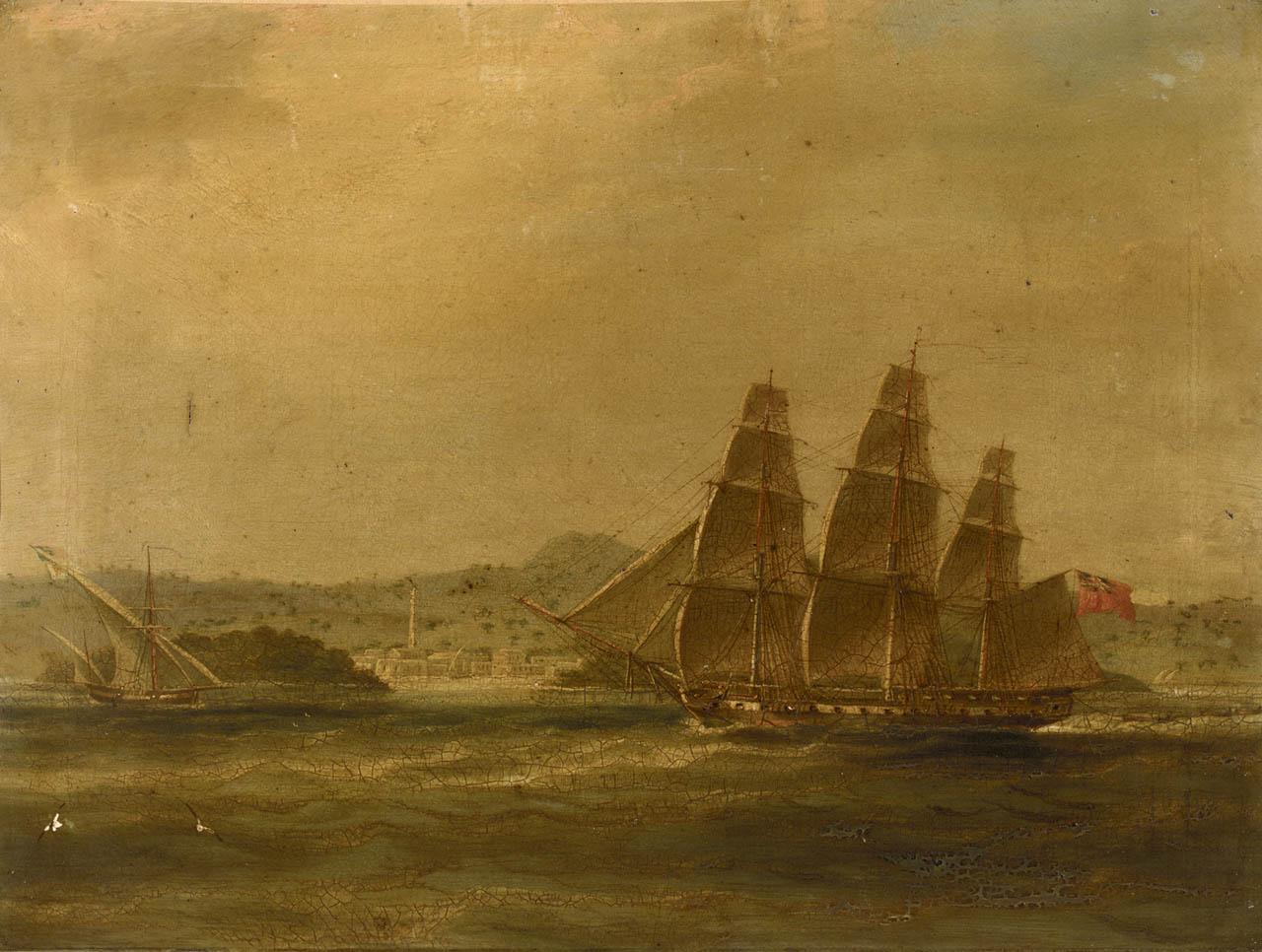
HMS Mercury takes La Pugliese in Barletta, 7 September 1809 by William John Huggins

On 7 September Mercury cut out the French schooner-of-war Pugliese from Barletta. Pugliese was armed with seven guns and had a crew of 37 men. The boats, under the command of Lieutenant Pall, accomplished this despite the schooner being under the protection not only of her own armament but also two armed feluccas, a castle, and small arms fire; the British suffered no casualties. This was Mercury's last action before she was paid off in early 1810.

Mercury was fitted out as a troopship at Woolwich in mid-1810 and commissioned in May that year as a 16-gun troopship under Lieutenant William Webb. Commander John Tancock succeeded Webb in mid-1810 and Mercury spent most of 1811 on the Lisbon station. (Note: For more on John Tancock see: O'Byrne, William R. (1849). "Tancock, John" . A Naval Biographical Dictionary. London: John Murray.) Commander Clement Milward took over in November 1811 and went out to the Leeward Islands. Mercury's last commanding officer was Commander Sir John Charles Richardson, who took over while she was still in the Leewards.

On 29 July 1813, Mercury was among the British vessels that shared in the capture of the American ship Fame. (Coquette was another.) Fame, under the command of Captain Job Coffin, had been out since August 1811 and was on her return from whaling in the Pacific when captured. She had a cargo of 1200 barrels of sperm oil.

== Fate ==
Mercury was finally broken up at Woolwich in January 1814.
