= HMS Corso (1796) =

Brig of the Royal Navy (1796–1816)

History

Spain
- Name: El Corso
- Launched: 1791
- Captured: 2 December 1796

Great Britain
- Name: HMS Corso, or HMS El Corso
- Acquired: 2 December 1796 by capture
- Commissioned: December 1796
- Fate: Sold 1814

General characteristics
- Tons burthen: 23436/94 bm
- Length: 72 ft 8 in (22.1 m) (Keel)
- Beam: 24 ft 7 1/2 in (7.5 m)
- Depth of hold: 11 ft 7 in (3.5 m)
- Sail plan: Brig
- Complement: Spanish service: 136; British service:100
- Armament: Spanish service: 18 × 6-pounder guns; British service:18 × 6-pounder guns

El Corso was launched in Spain in 1791 as a naval brig. the British Royal Navy captured her in 1796 and took her into service as HMS Corso. She then served in the Mediterranean where she captured numerous small vessels, the great majority of which were merchant vessels. In 1802 she sailed to England. From July 1802 to her sale in September 1814 she served as a receiving ship.

== Capture ==
On 2 December 1796 HMS Southampton encountered the Spanish naval brig El Corso off Monaco as El Corso was on her way from Genoa to Barcelona. Southampton captured El Corso by boarding. She was armed with eighteen 6-pounder guns and had a crew of 136 men under the command of Don Antonio Oacaro. The Royal Navy took the brig into service as HMS Corso.

== Royal Navy ==
Commander Bartholomew James commissioned Corso in the Mediterranean in December 1796.

On 6 August 1798 Corso and Espoir captured Liguria. (Note: A first-class share of the prize money was worth £591 16s and 5 3/4d; a fifth-class share, that of a seaman or marine, was worth £7 11s 9d.)

On 24 August Corso captured the French privateer Francois near Corfu. Francois was armed with two guns on carriages and six swivel guns. She had a crew of 23 men under the command of Clement Roux. She was five days out of Malaga and had captured nothing. (Note: Her home port is unknown.)

On 18 October Corso and Espoir captured Madona del Ydra. (Note: A first-class share of the prize money was worth £514 7s and 8 3/4d; a fifth-class share was worth £6 5s 5 1/2d.)

Commander Lord William Stuart was appointed to command Corso on 24 December 1798, but Lieutenant Corydon Boger, from Majestic was in temporary command on 20 November 1798 in Stuart's place. Corso was in Tangier Bay, having the day before brought a convoy into the Bay of Gibraltar. Boger encountered and chased two French privateers. He captured one of them, Adolphe, of six guns on carriages, and with a crew of 42 men. The other privateer ran on shore about two miles west of Tariff. Because dusk was approaching and the weather was hazy, Boger could not safely attempt to destroy her. (Note: Both her port of origin and commissioning are unknown.)

Then on 1 December Lieutenant Boger chased a French privateer on shore three leagues eastward of Cape Malabar. (Note: It is not clear where Cape Malabar is, and the name may be a garbling of Málaga or Marbella. Boger wrote his report the next day in Rosia Bay, Gibraltar.) With the assistance of boats from Espoir the British were able to bring her off. When the boarding party arrived at the vessel they found that her crew had deserted her. The privateer, of unknown name, was armed with two carriage guns, two swivels, and small arms. Corso and Espoir shared the prize money for the vessel, which the London Gazette, apparently mistakenly, described as the barque Adolphe.

By January 1799 Commander Stuart was in command of Corso. (Note: Boger went on to command the schooner Gipsy in the Caribbean.) In February–March 1799 Corso was in the Ionian Islands. She had been sent there to encourage the joint Russian-Ottoman squadron under Admiral Ushakov conducting the Siege of Corfu (1798–1799) to send some vessels to join the British at Messina. Corso may have participated in the seizure of the island of Vido. (Note: At Vido the allies captured Frimaire, a tartane or bombard that the French Navy had requisitioned at Agde in July 1794. She had been decommissioned at Corfu on 30 December 1798. She was serving as part of a floating battery in the small harbour at Vido. She was captured on 29 February 1799 at the fall of the island.)

Stuart received promotion to post captain and took command of Spartiate at Plymouth on 9 November 1799. In November Commander William Ricketts assumed command of Corso.

A French convoy carrying troops and supplies to Malta left Toulon around 7 February 1800. The convoy consisted of the 74-gun French ship Généreux (1785), the 20-gun corvettes Badine and Fauvette, the 16-gun Sans Pareille, and two or three transport ships.

On 18 February 1800 Corso was in company with a number of ships under the command of Lord Nelson when lookouts on HMS Alexander sighted the French and gave chase. Alexander caught up with one of the French ships, which struck after Alexander fired a few shots. Nelson ordered HMS Audacious and Corso to take charge of the captured French ship while he in his flagship HMS Foudroyant, with Alexander, HMS Northumberland, and the frigate HMS Success continued the chase. The British eventually caught up with Contre-amiral Jean-Baptiste Perrée's flagship Généreux and forced her to surrender.

On the 19th Corso arrived at the British blockade of Malta with the vessel that Alexander had captured. The captured vessel was Ville de Marseilles, a transport armed en flûte, was carrying salt meat, brandy, wine, clothing, stores, etc. (Note: Ville de Marseilles was a merchant flûte that the French government requisitioned at Marseilles around May 1798. She had a burthen of some 650 tons, and was pierced for 24 guns. She had been refitted in June 1798 at Marseilles and was at Toulon in 1799.)

In March 1800 Corso captured three merchantmen:

- Swedish brig Catherine, from Barcelona to Leghorn, with a cargo of wine, brandy, and cochineal (14 March);
- Genoese gondolo Signora della Latera, from Cabic to Genoa, with a cargo of wheat (16 March);
- Ragusan brig Assunta, from Marseilles bound to Leghorn and Ragusa, with a cargo of wine and copper (20 March).

While Napoleon Bonaparte and his army were in Egypt, Bonaparte sent an emissary with gifts to the Bashaw of Tripoli, who consequently expelled the British consul general there. Nelson had Corso convey the consul general back to Tripoli with Ricketts negotiating the consul's reinstatement. Over subsequent months Corso sailed to and from Tripoli several times.

Corso also assisted at the siege of Genoa (6 April – 4 June 1800). Her dispersal of a grain convoy helped the Austrian forces to capture the city, albeit only temporarily.

In June and July Corso captured more merchant vessels:

- French tartane, name unknown, carrying flour (25 June);
- Ragusan brig Pastor Fidele, from Barcelona to Leghorn, carrying brandy (11 July);
- Ragusan brig San Gaetano, from Barcelona to Leghorn, carrying wine(13 July);
- Genoese settee, name unknown, from Port Maurice, with no cargo (destroyed 24 July);
- Genoese polacre ship Saint Gio Baptiste, from Marseilles to Port Maurice, carrying wine (25 July);
- Genoese settee Misericordia, from Marseilles to Savona, carrying hoops (25 July); *Genoese settee Nostra Signora Montresero, from Port Maurice to Marseilles (25 July).

On 28 August 1800, Corso and Pigmy were at Cesenatico. Their orders were to destroy the vessels in its harbour, and "make a proper example of the town". The British were unable to approach closely enough so during the night of 30 August Ricketts sent in boats of both vessels under the overall command of Lieutenant James Lucas Yeo, first lieutenant of Corso. The attackers were able to capture the town, sink two boats, and burn 11 others. One of the sunken vessels was deeply laden with copper, money, and bale goods. Four of the vessels sank in the mouth of the harbour, and fire consumed both piers. The British sailors were able to hold off some French infantry, but when Ricketts observed French cavalry approaching he ordered the boats to withdraw.

Afterwards, Ricketts sent the authorities of the town the following note:

To the Inhabitants of Cesenatico.

The Treachery of your Municipality, in causing to be arrested an Officer with Dispatches, has been long known to the British Admiral in these Seas. That Municipality may now sadly know that the Severity of Judgment, long delayed, is always exemplary. That the Innocent suffer with the Guilty, though much to be regretted, is the natural Feature of War; and the more terrible Infliction on this occasion, the more striking the Example should prove to surrounding Municipalities.

(Signed) W. RICKETTS

In September 1800 Corso captured numerous vessels carrying salt from Trapani to Ponte Gori: (Note: Trapani is the locus of important salt ponds. See :Riserva naturale integrale Saline di Trapani e Paceco. Ponte Gori (sometimes referred to Ponto Gai), currently remains unidentified.)

On 6 September 1800 Corso captured:

- Neapolitan polacre ship Madona del Carmina;
- Neapolitan polacre ship Madona del Laura;
- Neapolitan polacre ship Madona del Gratia; and
- Imperial polacre bark Madona del Jossata.

Six days later Corso captured the Neapolitan polacre brig Archimede.

On 16 September Corso captured:

- Neapolitan polacre ship Rachele;
- Neapolitan polacre ship Divini del Providenza;
- Neapolitan polacre ship Vicenza di Tripani;
- Imperial Ireballo Pleni Luno;
- Imperial Ireballo Successo; and,
- Neapolitan polacre ship Annunciate Angiolo.

Lastly, on 17 September captured the Neapolitan polacre Madona del Picta.

Next, Corso and Pygmy captured a number of vessels in the Adriatic.

On 16 November they captured a Cisalpine trabaccolo carrying pine and another trabaccolo in ballast, both sailing from Ravenna to Pesaro.

On 4 January 1801 some merchants of Trieste presented Ricketts with a diamond ring in appreciation of his efforts against French privateers in the Adriatic.

On 17 January they captured two vessels:

- Imperial ship Sfinge, sailing from Barcelona to Trieste with a cargo of brandy (17 January 1801); (Note: Seinge is probably Sseinge, which Corso captured that day.)
- Russian polacca ship Madona Turgliana, which sailing from the Morea to Trieste with a cargo of leather.

On 13 February they detained the Danish ship Adonis, which was sailing from Copenhagen to Trieste with a cargo of stockfish.

On 16 February they detained the Danish brig Madellina Christiana, which was sailing from Venice to Zante with a cargo of planks.

On 27 February they recaptured the Imperial trebaccolo Madona del Annunciade, which was sailing from Trieste to Fiume with a cargo of hemp. She had been a prize to a French privateer.

On 15 March Pygmy captured the French trebaccolo privateer Achille, from Ancona, with Corso in company.

On 11 April Corso captured two Imperial brigs, Padre Armoroza, which was carrying cotton from Messina to Triest, and Nuova Armicize, which was sailing from Cyprus to Trieste.

On 17 April Corso captured the Cisalpine trebaccolo St. Luizi, which was sailing from Eipidore bound for Siniglis with a cargo of wheat.

On 19 April Corso recaptured the imperial brig Imperetore, which was sailing from Trieste to Zante with a cargo of merchandise. Corso also took two brigs and a trabaccolo.

On 27 May 1801 Corso was off Manfredonia. There she captured Corivesse (or Ecrivisse), a small vessel of one brass gun and 16 men under the command of M. Bernard du Bourdier, a lieutenant of Régénérée. He and another officer were carrying dispatches from Alexandria to Ancona.

On 23 June 1801 from Mercury and Corso were in the Tremiti Islands where they destroyed the pirate tartane Tigre, of eight 6 and 12-pounder guns and a crew of 60 French and Italians. The Royal Marines landed and captured some of the pirates, who had mounted a 4-pounder gun on a hill. Meanwhile, the cutting out party brought out Tigre, together with bales of cotton and other goods that she had taken from vessels she had robbed.

An attempt to attack Pesaro with the aid of Italian partisans came to nothing. Corso and Pigmy then answered an appeal from Venice and took all necessary measures to protect the city against a reported French force.

== Harbour service ==
On 10 July 1802 Corso arrived at Spithead from the Mediterranean. On the 15th she sailed from Spithead or Woolwich to be paid off. (Note: Ricketts had received promotion to post captain on 29 April 1802.) Between 20 July and 24 March 1803 Corso underwent fitting at Deptford for service as a receiving ship. Lieutenant Joshua Kneeshaw recommissioned her at Woolwich.

On 27 March 1803 Corso was ordered to Gravesend to serve under Captain Motley, the Regulating Officer there. Her role was to receive men pressed from merchant vessels, such as East Indiamen, returning to England.

In 1804 Lieutenant George A. Spencer replaced Kneeshaw. In 1808 she was under the command of Lieutenant George Taylor. In 1813 she was under the command of Lieutenant Curry William Hillier, and later Lieutenant Charles Carter.

== Fate ==
Corso was paid off at Woolwich in 1814. The "Principal Officers and Commissioners of His Majesty's Navy" offered "El Corso, of 234 tons", "lying at Woolwich" for sale on 1 September 1814. She sold there on that day for £500.
