= Jean-Jacques Magendie =

French Navy officer

Jean-Jacques Magendie (21 May 1766 in Bordeaux – 26 March 1835 in Paris) was a French Navy officer. He famously captained the flagship Bucentaure at the Battle of Trafalgar.

== Biography ==
=== Early career ===
Magendie joined the French Royal Navy in 1781 as an apprentice, and later sailed on merchant ships, raising to second captain and distinguishing himself to the point where he was mentioned in a June 1793 meeting of the National Convention. He was brought into Navy service with the rank of ensign and given command of a cutter patrolling off the coasts of England and Ireland.

In 1794, he captained the cutter Ranger, and the corvette Espion (Note: Quintin (p. 251) gives the name Espoir instead of Espion, apparently in error as they state she was captured by Lively in March 1795. A Hasard-class brig Espoir was in commission at the time, but she was not captured on 2–3 March 1795.) from July. On 4 March 1795, the British frigate Lively captured Espion about 13 leagues off Ushant.

Released, Magendie returned to France, where the court-martial acquitted him for the loss of his ship. On 28 September 1795, he married Raimonde Deschazeau.

=== Frigate captain ===
In March 1796, he was promoted to commander, and in September received the command of the Tartu. He took part in the early stages of the Expédition d'Irlande, but on 5 January 1797, Tartu she was captured by HMS Polyphemus.

Magendie was again taken prisoner. He returned to France in September 1798, and was again cleared of any wrongdoing in the less of his ship. He then served as first officer on the brand new Africaine, under captain Pierre-Félix de Lapalisse. Upon her return, Africaine joined up with Régénérée and was put under the command of captain Saunier. Tasked with ferrying ammunition for the Armée d'Orient.

Split from Régénérée by a storm, Africaine encountered HMS Phoebe, under Captain Robert Barlow, east of Gibraltar. Phoebe, which had the weather gage, overtook Africaine and engaged her at close range, despite the French soldiers, who augmented the frigate's guns with their musket fire. Phoebe's guns inflicted more than 340 casualties on the soldiers and seaman of Africaine before she struck at 9:30 p.m. Magendie sustained a head injury and was captured for the third time.

Released from Minorca, Magendie returned to France in March 1801. In September, he was given command of the Minerva in Napoli, sailed her to Toulon where she took the name Sibylle, and from then took part in a variety of missions. He distinguished himself during the capture of Santo Domingo, earning the provisory rank of captain. After returning to France, he sailed to Naples to surrender his frigate to the Napolitan government, as ordered.

=== Trafalgar campaign ===
In October 1803, Magendie was tasked to supervise the commissioning of Bucentaure. After she entered service, he became her captain and flag officer to Vice-Admiral Latouche Tréville, who died on board on 18 August 1804, and then to Vice-Admiral Villeneuve.

Magendie then took part in the Trafalgar Campaign, notably the Battle of Cape Finisterre. Magendie captained Bucentaure at the Battle of Trafalgar, where he was wounded in the mouth and captured.

Released on parole in February 1806, he returned to France, where he worked at the Ministry of the Navy.

=== Peninsula wars ===
In December 1807, he was sent to Lisbon and tasked with supervising the naval activities of the harbour. In August 1808, by the Convention of Sintra, the defeated French troops were allowed to return to France and Magendie was ferried on HMS Nymphe.

He worked in various duties on shore and at the ministry until October 1810, when he was again sent to besieged Lisbon to command the naval forces there. The city did not fall, however, and Magendie stayed in Portugal until June 1811.

He supervised the commissioning of Trajan, before commanding the Ajax in Toulon. In February 1812, he took part in a skirmish between three ships of the line and two frigates against one ship and two frigates.

=== Late career and retirement ===
At the Bourbon Restoration, Ajax was decommissioned and Magendie was task with the supervision of Toulon harbour. During the Hundred Days, Ajax was reactivated with Magendie for captain. He was consequently dismissed from the Navy at the Second Restoration, and retired.

From 1821, he directed a steamboat service between Paris and Le Havre.

== Honours ==
- Officer of the Legion of Honour.
- Knight of the Order of Saint Louis.
- Order of the Lily.
