= Sugar Cane (1786 ship) =

History

Great Britain
- Name: Sugar Cane
- Owner: Turner & Co.
- Launched: 16 October 1786, Rotherhithe
- Captured: 1797, but recaptured and returned to service
- Fate: No longer listed in 1798

General characteristics
- Tons burthen: 362, or 403
- Complement: 33 or 40
- Armament: 16 × 6-pounder guns

Sugar Cane, was a three-decker merchantman and convict ship. In 1793 she transported convicts from Ireland to Australia. On her return trip she sailed from Bengal to Britain under contract to the British East India Company. During the French Revolutionary Wars she sailed under a letter of marque as a slave ship. She made two voyages carrying enslaved people from West Africa to the Americas. In 1796 or 1797, on her second slave trading voyage she captured a French ship, but shortly thereafter was herself captured. The British Royal Navy recaptured her and she apparently was returned to service. She is last listed in 1798.

== Career ==
She was launched in 1786 upon the Thames River. In 1789 Lloyd's Register showed her master as W. Seaton, her owners as Turner and Co., and her trade as London-St Vincent. She was coppered in 1793.

Under the command of Thomas Musgrave, she sailed from Portsmouth for Ireland, on 9 March 1793. Having embarked with 110 male and 50 female convicts, she left Cork, Ireland, on 12 April 1793. A sergeant's party from the New South Wales Corps provided the guards for the convicts.

On 25 May the Government's agent had a prisoner executed. The man had managed to get out of his irons and another prisoner had accused the man of planning a mutiny. Sugar Cane arrived at Rio de Janeiro in late June and left on 13 July.

Sugar Cane arrived at Port Jackson, New South Wales on 17 September 1793. Other than the man who had been executed, no convicts died on the voyage, and the prisoners arrived in good health.

Sugar Cane left Port Jackson for Bengal in late 1793, in company with Boddington.

The vessels separated at some point, and Sugar Cane went on to discover some islands in the Caroline archipelago. The islands were the Pingelap (6°13′5″N 160°42′10″E) atoll, now part of Pohnpei State of the Federated States of Micronesia. (Note: Captain MacAskill in Lady Barlow rediscovered them in 1809. Errors in measurement of their location resulted in the islands being separately named as the Musgrave Islands and the MacAskill islands.)

Sugar Cane left Calcutta on 15 May 1794. She reached Madras on 29 June, the Cape on 4 October, St Helena on 25 October, Crookhaven on 25 December, and Kinsale on 31 January. She arrived at the Downs on 27 February.

On 18 July 1795, John Marman received a letter of marque for Sugar Cane. The letter of marque authorized Sugar Cane to engage in offensive action against French shipping should the opportunity arise. Lloyd's Register for 1795 shows her master changing from Musgrave to "J. Manning". and her trade changing to London-Africa.

Marman sailed Sugar Cane from London on 29 July 1795, bound for the Gold Coast. In 1795, 79 vessels sailed from English ports to Africa to transport enslaved people; 14 sailed from London.

Sugar Cane arrived at Cape Coast Castle on 21 September. She acquired captives there and arrived 5 January 1796 at Montevideo, in the Rio de la Plata with 228. She arrived back at London on 10 June.

Marman received a second letter of marque on 1 July 1796. Sugar Cane, with Marman, master, sailed from London on 4 August to the Gold Coast again to acquire captives. In 1796, 103 vessels sailed from English ports to acquire captives from Africa and to transport them to the Americas. Eight of these vessels sailed from London. Sugar Cane arrived at Cape Coast Castle on 30 September.

On her way, Sugar Cane recaptured Harlequin, which the French had captured as she was sailing from Liverpool to Africa. Sugar Cane sent Harlequin into Cape Coast. Shortly thereafter, the French captured Sugar Cane as she was sailing from Africa to Barbadoes.

In 1797, 40 British vessels on voyages to transport enslaved people were lost. Thirteen were lost in the Middle Passage, sailing between Africa and the West Indies. During the period 1793 to 1807, war, rather than maritime hazards or resistance by the captives, was the greatest cause of vessel losses among British enslaving vessels.

In 1797 Lloyd's Register still showed Sugar Cane, Manning, master, with trade Liverpool-Africa.

== Recapture and subsequent career ==
The French renamed Sugar Cane Marseilloise (or Marsellois). However, in October 1797 HMS Minerva and HMS Lively recaptured Marsellois as she was sailing from Guadeloupe to France. They then took the richly-laden former Sugar Cane into Martinique.

Sugar Cane was restored to her former owners, who revived her name. Although there is a report that she was loaned out to transport convicts, there is no record of that. A Sugarcane, Campbell, master, did arrive at Port Jackson on 15 October 1798 with a cargo of provisions. She then sailed for India, no date of departure being given.

Sugar Cane is no longer listed in the 1798 Lloyd's Register.
