= Pierre Maurice Julien de Quérangal =

French Navy officer (1758–1840)

Counter-Admiral Pierre Maurice Julien de Quérangal (French pronunciation: [pjɛʁ mɔʁis ʒyljɛ̃ də keʁɑ̃ɡal]; 13 December 1758 – c. 1840) was a French Navy officer.

== Life ==
Quérangal joined the French Navy in 1775, rising to lieutenant by 1790. In 1791, he was sent to Saint-Domingue, where he captained a schooner and a brig, and was tasked with secret missions. Sent back to Nantes, he was briefly arrested. He went to Paris and resigned his commission in reaction to the Execution of Louis XVI. On the advice of Gaspard Monge, then Ministre de la Marine, he joined back and was sent to Brest. There, he had to fight a number of accusations; he was eventually sent to Lorient by Jeanbon Saint-André, where was made first officer of Tyrannicide. He was later given command of the fluyt Ville de Lorient, but was shortly arrested again, and detained for nine months. Released, Quérangal was appointed to Océan, flagship of the fleet, as first general aid major. He took part in the Croisière du Grand Hiver, where he was tasked to conduct rescue operations when Superbe foundered after taking in water; Quérangal managed to save the 936-man crew and left the ship last, and returned to Océan where he was promoted to ship-of-the-line captain on the spot. Returned to Brest, Quérangal was given command of the frigate Cocarde, leading a three-frigate squadron to patrol off France and Ireland. He was later given command of two larger squadrons to patrol off Spain.

In November 1795, Quérangal was given command of the 74-gun Mucius, on which he let a division during the Expédition d'Irlande. He managed to reach the designated landing spot in Bantry Bay, where he waited the rest of the fleet until it became clear that the expedition was a failure. Mucius returned to Brest, which she reached on 1 January 1797. In early 1798, Quérangal was appointed in command of the 74-gun Duquesne, part of a Franco-Spanish fleet under Admiral Bruix. He briefly took part in the Saint-Domingue expedition, though Duquesne aborted her journey early due to a leak and had to return to Toulon. Quérangal was then put in command of the Mediterranean station, and in October 1802, he was tasked to ferry reinforcements to Saint-Domingue. Upon his arrival, Admiral Latouche Tréville put him in command of a division comprising Duquesne, Intrépide and the 40-gun Sibylle, along with two corvettes and a number of transports, and tasked with supporting general Clausel in his attack of Port-de-Paix. In March 1803, Quérangal replaced Latouche Tréville in command of the Northern station at Cap Français.

In July, the French station was blockaded by a British squadron. With imminent arrival of an important convoy, it was decided to sacrifice Duquesne in an attempt to lure the British off the colony. Quérangal requested that his crew, weakened by fevers from 863 men to only 235, be reinforced, but none fit for duty could be assigned to Duquesne before she departed. She was soon detected by the British squadron, which gave chase; Duquesne fought a rear-guard battle until a British ship cut her path; surrounded by a much stronger opponent and his crew in no condition to fight on, Quérangal then struck his colours. He was taken to Jamaica, where he was detained three months before HMS Cumberland ferried him to England. Quérangal was released on parole after three years and a half. In February 1807, he went to Paris and requested a court-martial for the loss of Duquesne, as was the custom for captains whose ships were lost or captured; Napoleon, however, refused, stating that Duquesne was a small loss to pay for the colony and that the intended manoeuver had been successfully completed by Quérangal, and rewarding him with advantageous positions for his daughter and son. Quérangal was then appointed to Rochefort harbour. At the Bourbon Restoration, Quérangal was maintained in his duties at Rochefort. After the Hundred Days, he was accused of bonapartism, and was retired with the rank of counter admiral.

== Sources and references ==
- Biographie Des Hommes Du Jour, Germain Sarrut & Edme Thédore Bourg, pp 353–357
