= Edmund and George (1788 ship) =

History

Great Britain
- Name: Edmund and George
- Builder: Launched by Peter Everitt Mestaer, King and Queen Dock, Rotherhithe
- Launched: 24 October 1788
- Fate: Captured 1797

General characteristics
- Type: Ship
- Tons burthen: 343 (bm)
- Length: 104 ft 0 in (31.7 m)
- Beam: 28 ft 8 in (8.7 m)
- Propulsion: Sail
- Armament: 10 × 6-pounder guns

Edmund and George (or Edmund & George), was launched on the Thames River in 1788 as a West Indiaman. Then in 1796 she made one voyage to Bengal for the British East India Company (EIC). The French captured her while she was homeward-bound.

Edmund and George appeared in the 1789 issue of Lloyd's Register with T. Rainey, master, J. Christie, owner, and trade London—St Kitts.

Lloyd's Register for 1796 shows her master as J. Findlay, changing to T. Mead, and her owner as Bridgeman, changing to J. Annen & Co. Her trade is London—Jamaica, changing to London—India.

Edmund and George sailed for Bengal on 11 August 1796. Her master was T. Meed, or T. Mead. As she was returning to England from Bengal the French captured her. The EIC valued the cargo it had lost in Edmund and George's capture at £6,100.
