= HMS Fulminante (1798) =

Cutter of the Royal Navy

History

France
- Name: Fulminante
- Acquired: In service 1798
- Captured: 29 October 1798

Great Britain
- Name: HMS Fulminante
- Acquired: 29 October 1798 (by capture)
- Captured: 2 June 1800

France
- Name: Fulminante
- Acquired: 2 June 1800 (by capture)
- Captured: September 1800

Great Britain
- Name: HMS Fulminante
- Acquired: September 1800 (by capture)
- Honours and awards: Naval General Service Medal with clasp "Egypt"
- Fate: Wrecked 24 March 1801

General characteristics
- Type: cutter
- Tons burthen: 40 40/94 (bm)
- Length: 44 ft 0 in (13.4 m) (overall); 33 ft 01/2 in (10.1 m) (keel)
- Beam: 29 ft 6 1/1 in (9.0 m)
- Propulsion: Sails
- Sail plan: Cutter
- Armament: French service: 8 × 4-pounder guns; British service: carronades

HMS Fulminante was a cutter belonging to the French Navy that the British captured in 1798, the French recaptured in 1800, and the British re-recaptured three months later. She was wrecked early in 1801.

== Capture ==
On 13 September 1798, Fulminante, under the command of Captain Monier captured the American brig Fame and brought her into Algeciras.

On 29 October 1798, between Tarifa and Tangiers, Espoir, under the command of Captain Loftus Otway Bland, captured Fulminante, which had had the "impudence" (in Bland's words) to attack Espoir. Admiral Jervis, Earl of St Vincent, needing an advice boat, took her into service the next day as HMS Fulminante.

On 7 November Fulminante was with Commodore John Thomas Duckworth at the capture of the island of Minorca. As a result, she shared in the prize money for the capture. Lieutenant William Robinson commanded her in January 1800, and perhaps earlier. Later that year Lieutenant Edward Morris replaced Robinson.

== Recapture and re-recapture ==
The French privateer Deux Frères captured Fulminante on 2 June 1800. She had been sailing off Cadiz when she encountered the French privateer. After a 40-minute fight the French were able to board Fulminante, forcing her to strike.

In September the British recaptured Fulminante. By January 1801 she was under the command of Lieutenant Robert Corbet.

== Loss ==
Fulminante accompanied Lord Keith's invasion of Egypt. Here she supported General Sir Ralph Abercromby as he moved his troops from Abukir to Alexandria. She was stationed close to the shore to fire on French shore positions but her carronades did not have the range and so her shots fell short. On 23 March Corbet therefore brought her to within a cable's length — 240 yards (219 m) — of the shore and anchored her there. During the night the wind rose, causing one of her cables to rub against the rocks, parting it. The second cable did not hold and within minutes Fulmiante had drifted on shore and was wrecked. There was no loss of life. The location of the wreck was reportedly "La Cruelle", near Damietta, which is to the east of Abu Qir. The court martial for the loss occurred on 1 April and apparently absolved Corbet. On 15 May Corbet delivered dispatches from Keith to the Admiralty.

Although Fulminante was present for less than a month during the campaign, when the Admiralty in 1847 authorized the awarding of the Naval General Service Medal with clasp "Egypt" to all surviving claimants from the crews of all vessels present between 8 March and 2 September, Fulminante was among the vessels listed as qualifying.

== See also ==
- List of ships captured in the 19th century
