= Boddington (1781 ship) =

History

Great Britain
- Name: Boddington
- Owner: Boddington (1781-1805)
- Operator: East India Company (1793-1795)
- Builder: Thames
- Launched: 1781
- Fate: Wrecked near Blackwall in September 1805.

General characteristics
- Tons burthen: 331 or 350 (bm)
- Armament: 6 × 4-pounder guns

Boddington, sometimes referred to as Boddingtons, was a merchant ship launched in 1781 on the River Thames. For the first decade of her career she sailed as a West Indiaman. She made one voyage in 1792 transporting convicts from Ireland to Australia. For her return trip she also made one voyage for the East India Company from Asia to Britain. She wrecked in 1805 on the River Thames off Blackwall, Middlesex.

== Career ==
Boddington was launched on the Thames for Boddington, who employed her sailing between London and Nevis. She first appeared in Lloyd's Register (LR) in 1781.

Year	Master	Owner	Trade	Source & notes
1781	J.Clarke	Boddington	London–Nevis	LR
1793	J.Clarke; R.Chalmers	Boddington	London–Nevis; Cork–Botany Bay	LR; good repair 1793

Under the command of Captain Robert Chalmers, Boddington sailed from Cork, Ireland, on 15 February 1792, with 125 male and 20 female convicts. During the voyage Chalmers suppressed a mutiny by the convicts. She arrived at Port Jackson, New South Wales on 7 August 1793. One male convict died on the voyage. She left Port Jackson in October 1793 for Bengal, in company with Sugar Cane.

Between 1793 and 1795 Boddington made one trip for the East India Company from Penang to Britain. She apparently was in Bengal prior to arriving at Penang. Lloyd's List reported that "The Boddingtons, Chalmers, from Bengal to London, met with bad weather which obliged her to put into Prince of Wales Island, where she has been refitted, and was to proceed under Convoy of the Bombay frigate." (Note: At the time, the frigate Bombay belonged to the East India Company; the Royal Navy purchased her in 1805. The EIC used Bombay to patrol the waters in the Bay of Bengal and beyond.) Boddington left Penang on 11 November 1794 and reached St Helena on 27 February 1795. The East India fleet left Boddington and Barbara, from the South Seas, at "the Line". (Note: Barbara, of 241 tons (bm), had been launched in 1771 at Philadelphia. Between 1788 and c.1802, when she was captured, she had completed some eight whaling voyages.) She then arrived at Long Reach on 5 August.

Year	Master	Owner	Trade	Source & notes
1795	Chalmers; W.Kitgour	Seale & Co.	London–Botany Bay; London–West Indies	LR; good repair 1792 & 1795
1804	Cadonhead; Wright	Higgins & Co.	London–Jamaica	LR; good repair 1792, thorough repair 1798, & good repair 1802
1805	P.Wright	Higgins & Co.	London–Jamaica	LR; good repair 1792, thorough repair 1798, good repair 1802, & damages repaired 1804

== Fate ==
The Register of Shipping for 1805 gave the name of Boddington's master as Wright, and her trade as London—Jamaica.

During the night of 11 September 1805, Boddington was one of a number of ships that came adrift from the mooring chain whilst waiting to enter the West India Dock. She stranded in the Thames off Blackwall on a sandbank, sank, and was wrecked. On 13 September 1805, Lloyd's List reported that "The Bodingtons, Wright, from Jamaica, is on Shore near Blackwall, and full of Water."
