= HMS Swift (1804) =

Sloop of the Royal Navy

History

United Kingdom
- Name: Pacific
- Owner: Peter & William Mellish
- Builder: Rotherhithe
- Launched: 1802
- Fate: Sold 1804

United Kingdom
- Name: HMS Swift
- Ordered: 13 July 1807
- Acquired: June 1804 by purchase
- Fate: Sold 1814

United Kingdom
- Name: Pacific
- Owner: Various
- Acquired: 1814 by purchase
- Fate: Wrecked in 1828 though still listed in 1833

General characteristics
- Tons burthen: 307, or 321, or 326, or 327
- Length: Overall: 101 ft 10 in (31.0 m); keel: 84 ft 10 1/4 in (25.9 m)
- Beam: 26 ft 11 in (8.2 m)
- Propulsion: Sails
- Complement: 70 (HMS)
- Armament: HMS Swift; Upper deck: 16 × 12-pounder carronades; QD: 2 × 4-pounder guns; Fc: 2 × 4-pounder guns; Pacific: 6 × 6-pounder guns

HMS Swift was the whaler Pacific launched in 1802 that the British Royal Navy purchased in 1804 on her return from the Galápagos Islands. She served briefly in the Caribbean where she was involved in one notable capture of a Spanish guarda costa. She then served in the North Sea. The Navy laid her up July 1807, but then returned her to duty in 1810 as a storeship. The Navy sold her in 1814. She then resumed the name Pacific and returned to mercantile service. She was wrecked in 1828 but remained listed in 1833.

== Pacific ==
Pacific entered Lloyd's Register in the issue for 1802 with T. Hooper, master, P. Mellish, owner, and trade London–Southern Fisheries. The whaler Pacific, Thomas Hopper, master, and Peter & William Mellish, owners made a voyage to the coast of Peru in 1802. She was reported to have been at the Galapagos on 23 March 1803. On 30 January 1804 she encountered Spy, Welham Clarke, master, at 42.81°S 83.18°W. Clarke noted in his log that Pacific had 1300 barrels of sperm oil. Pacific returned to England on 17 May 1804.

== HMS Swift ==
In July Swift underwent fitting, and in August Captain John Wright commissioned her. She sailed for the Leeward Islands on 23 December 1804 as part of the escort to a convoy of West Indiamen, including Scarborough. A gale on 5 January dispersed the vessels.

In 1805 Swift captured the Spanish 10-gun schooner Marianne. As they were sailing in company in the bay of Honduras, Wright received intelligence that a Spanish guarda-costa had been raiding British commerce in the area. Wright put Lieutenant Smith on Marianne and sent her to look for the guarda-costa. Near the island of Bonacca Smith encountered some fishermen who informed him that the guarda-costa was sheltering under the guns of the forts at Trujillo, Honduras, and that she had taken two captured vessels into port, the schooner Admiral Duckworth, of Jamaica, and another vessel of unknown name from Honduras.

After dark on 13 August Smith sailed into the bay without being detected. He then sent in two boats of volunteers, each manned by six men, one under the command of the bosun and the other under the command of a midshipmen. All were volunteers and under orders to reconnoiter to verify the information. Smith also sailed closer to be able to provide covering fire if necessary.

The boat with the midshipman came up to the guarda-costa. The British clambered aboard and rapidly captured it before the other boat could arrive. Most of the crew of the guarda-costa were ashore and had left only the captain and 14 men aboard, and all fled when the British attacked. The noise alerted the men in the batteries in the forts, which started firing. The British seamen on the guarda-costa cut her cables and got her out of the harbour while returning fire on the forts from her guns, with Smith and Marianne also firing. The British were able to withdraw without having suffered a single casualty.

The guarda-costa's name turned out to be Caridad-Perfecta. Wright described her as "a very fine new Vessel, and in my Opinion, every way fit for His Majesty's Service." Unfortunately, the Navy did not take her into service.

Swift returned to England. On 6 July 1806 Admiral Bartholomew Rowley, at Sheerness, wrote to Admiral Markham in the Admiralty. Rowley reported that Swift had recently returned from Honduras Bay. He reported that Wright had stowed 13 mahogany logs betwixt decks, claiming they were ballast, and then had them publicly sold at Chatham. Wright had also engaged in some other pecuniary concerns that were not to his credit. Rowley stated that he would not have Wright at his table.

Wright remained in command of Swift and she moved to the North Sea. then in July 1807 she was paid off and placed in Ordinary at Sheerness.

Between September and December 1810 the Navy had her fitted as a storeship at Deptford. Then December December 1810 and November 1811 the Navy had her fitted at Woolwich for foreign service. In 1812 she was under the command of Mr. W. Moubray, master. She then sailed to Halifax. In 1813 she was under the command of Mr. J. Engledon, master.

Disposal: By 1814 Swift had returned to Deptford. On 3 November the "Principal Officers and Commissioners of His Majesty's Navy" offered for sale the "Swift store-ship, of 327 tons", lying at Deptford. She sold on that day for £3,200.

== Pacific ==
Pacific, of 386 tons (bm), river-built (i.e., built on the River Thames) in 1802, returned to the Register of Shipping (RS) in 1816. She does not reappear in Lloyd's Register.

Year	Master	Owner	Trade	Notes
1816	Edmonson; Richie	R&N. Neal; Miller	London–West Indies; London–Virginia	RS
1820	Richie	Miller	London–Virginia	RS; Surveyed in 1816
1825	Taylor	Captain	London–Madeira	RS; Large repair in 1820

On 9 December 1828 Lloyd's List reported that Pacific, Taylor, master, had been driven ashore at Reval. Then on the 26th, Lloyd's List reported that Pacific, Taylor, master, had been driven on shore at Neckmannes Ground and/but carried away by gale. Another report has it that she was wrecked on 16 November on Nickman's Ground, in the Baltic Sea off Hiiumaa, Russia. She was on a voyage from Vyborg, Russia, to Hull, Yorkshire.

However, Pacific remained listed, with stale data, in the Register of Shipping until 1833, which is the last time the Register published. Again, unfortunately, Lloyd's Register did not carry her.

Year	Master	Owner	Trade	Notes
1830	Taylor	Captain	London–Madeira	RS; last surveyed 1828
1833	Taylor	Captain	London–Madeira	RS; last surveyed 1828; overdue for survey
