= Lady Barlow (1803 ship) =

British ship

History

United Kingdom
- Name: Change
- Builder: Pegu, or Rangoon, or Calcutta
- Launched: 1802 or 1803
- Renamed: Lady Barlow
- Fate: Broken up 1822

General characteristics
- Tons burthen: 407, or 408 (bm)

Lady Barlow was launched as Change at Pegu, or equally Rangoon, in 1803 or 1802, as a country ship, that is she traded east of the Cape of Good Hope. Change was renamed Lady Barlow shortly after her launch. In 1804 Lady Barlow brought cattle to New South Wales, and then took the first cargo from the colony back to England. She was a transport vessel in the 1810 British campaign to take Île Bourbon and Île de France. She was broken up at Calcutta in 1822.

== Career ==
Lady Barlow, [Arthur Allen] M'Askill, master, arrived at Port Jackson on 17 May 1804 with cattle from Bengal. She had left Bengal with about 300 head of cattle and one Arabian stallion. About one third of the cattle died on the voyage, and the stallion died as she arrived in Sydney. Lady Barlow sailed from Sydney to the Derwent on 27 July, arriving there on 3 August. She delivered 135 cows, one bull, six oxen, two mares, one horse, and sixty sows, with the provisions and stores. She arrived back at Sydney on 2 September.

On 16 October a storm sank Lady Barlow at the King's outer moorings. One of her crew, a lascar, died. MacAskill lost his cargo, which consisted in large part of oil. Lady Barlow was raised with the assistance of HMS Investigator and the Fair American, and repaired.

Lady Barlow left for England on 21 January 1805, sailing via the Derwent. She arrived at Portsmouth on 7 July. Her cargo consisted of 264 tons of fine elephant seal oil, 13,750 seal skins, and 3673 solid feet of oak or beef wood.

The Australian merchant, Robert Campbell, and his family had sailed on Lady Barlow. So did Lieutenant John Bowen, who had spent two years in Australia serving the government there. Lady Barlow's cargo was Campbell's and he had shipped it as a direct challenge to the British East India Company (EIC) monopoly on British trade between Britain and ports east of the Cape of Good Hope.

When Lady Barlow arrived in London, British customs seized her. Campbell succeeded in winning his court case. The court allowed him to keep vessel and cargo, but he could only land his cargo in London for transshipment to Europe, most of which at the time was at war with Britain. Campbell also had to agree to carry a government cargo to India for the EIC, a voyage that fortuitously proved profitable. Customs eventually released the cargo but four months had passed since the seizure and in that time the price of seal skins had fallen. Campbell lost £7000 on the voyage.

On 27 November the EIC's Court of Directors chartered Lady Barlow to carry a cargo to Saint Helena and Bengal.

The first European observer of the Pingelap atoll, consisting of three islands – Pingelap Island, Sukoru and Daekae – was Captain Thomas Musgrave in the ship Sugar Cane. Captain MacAskill in Lady Barlow came upon them on 29 October in 1809 as Lady Barlow was on her way from Australia to China. Errors in measurement of their location resulted in the islands being separately named on charts in the 19th century as the Musgrave Islands and the MacAskill islands, within the Caroline archipelago. (MacAskill's coordinates of 6°12′N 158°32′E was the more accurate.)

For the invasions of Île Bourbon and Île de France (Mauritius) in 1810-1811 the British government hired a number of transport vessels; Lady Barlow was among them.

The British government chartered some nine of these vessels as cartels to carry back to France the French troops that they had captured in these campaigns. Lady Barlow returned to Bengal with Sir George Nugent, who had been appointed Commander-in-Chief, India, and his suite.

On 10 September 1815 Lady Barlow left Bengal with 130 Indian convicts bound to Mauritius.

In 1819 Lady Barlow's master was William Roy and her owner was Mackintosh and Company.

== Fate ==
Lady Barlow was broken up at Calcutta in 1822.
