= French corvette Sans Pareille (1798) =

Captured French Navy ship

Sans Pareille
History

France
- Name: Sans Pareille
- Builder: La Ciotat
- Laid down: 1797
- Launched: 1798
- Captured: 20 January 1801

United Kingdom
- Name: HMS Delight
- Acquired: 20 January 1801 by capture
- Fate: Sold April 1805

General characteristics
- Displacement: 480 tons (French)
- Tons burthen: 335 67/94 (bm), or 280 (French; "of load")
- Length: 97 ft 5 in (29.7 m) (overall); 77 ft 3 in (23.5 m) (keel)
- Beam: 28 ft 7 in (8.7 m)
- Depth of hold: 8 ft 2 in (2.5 m)
- Complement: French service:148, but 15 at capture; British service:100
- Armament: French service: 18 × brass 9-pounder guns + 2 × 36-pounder obussiers (at capture); British service: 18 × 24-pounder carronades

Sans Pareille was a privateer that the French Navy purchased off the stocks in 1797 or 1798, and that was launched in 1798. The Royal Navy captured her in 1801 off Sardinia, but laid her up when she reached Britain in 1802. She was sold in 1805.

== Early service ==
Sans Pareille was one of three corvettes at the battle of the Malta convoy on 18 February 1800.

Sans Pareille and the other two corvettes escaped before the engagement began.

== Capture ==
On 20 January 1801, HMS Mercury was some 40 leagues off Sardinia when she captured Sans Pareille after a chase of nine hours. Sans Pareille was a French navy corvette under the command of Citoyen Gabriel Renault, lieutenant de vaisseau. She carried 18 long brass 9-pounders and two howitzers. The reason she did not resist was that she had a crew of only 15 men. She had sailed from Toulon the day before and was carrying a cargo of shot, arms, medicines, and all manner of other supplies for the French army at Alexandria, Egypt. The Admiralty took Sans Pareille into service as HMS Delight.

== HMS Delight ==
It is not clear when the Royal Navy commissioned Delight. Commander the Honourable Frederick Aylmer was formally appointed to command Delight on 13 July 1802. (Note: The notice is dated at Whitehall, but this was probably a confirmation. He may have taken command in early 1802. Aylmer was later the 6th Baron Aylmer.)

On 11 September Delight arrived at the Motherbank and promptly went into quarantine. She had made the transit from Gibraltar in 15 days. Five days later she sailed eastward to be paid off.

== Fate ==
Delight arrived at Plymouth on 19 September where she was paid-off and laid-up. The Principal Officers and Commissioners of the Navy first offered the "Hull of His Majesty's Sloop Delight", at Plymouth for sale on 20 March 1805. Delight sold there in April.
