= Three Sisters (1788 ship) =

History

Great Britain
- Name: Three Sisters
- Builder: John Perry, Blackwall
- Launched: 2 August 1788
- Fate: Wrecked February 1799

General characteristics
- Tons burthen: 330, or 333 (bm)
- Armament: 1796: 12 × 6-pounder guns; 1797: 8 × 6-pounder + 4 × 4-pounder guns

Three Sisters was launched in 1788 as a West Indiaman. In 1795 she made one voyage to Bengal for the British East India Company (EIC). She then returned to the West Indies trade and was lost in February 1799 on her way to Barbados from London.

== Career ==
Three Sisters first appeared in Lloyd's Register (LR) in 1789. (LR for 1788 is not available online.)

Year	Master	Owner	Trade	Source
1789	M.Johnson	Mangles	London–Jamaica	LR
1795	M.Johnson; J.Hall	Mangles; Calvert & Co.	London–Jamaica; London–East Indies	LR

Three Sisters sailed for Bengal on 30 August 1795. On 3 November she was reported at 9°48′N 20°49′W on her way to St Helena.

At the time the EIC had a monopoly on trade between Great Britain and India or China. It is not clear why Three Sisters had EIC approval for the voyage. She is not among the vessels on the list of vessels that the EIC had chartered to bring rice back from Bengal on behalf of the British government.

However, she was on an authorized voyage. She is listed among the vessels which had arrived in Britain with a cargo on behalf of the EIC.

Three Sisters, Graham Steel, master, left Bengal on 2 August 1796. She reached the Cape on 4 November and St Helena on 30 November; she was at Falmouth on 5 February 1797.

On her return from Bengal Three Sisters returned to the West Indies trade.

Year	Master	Owner	Trade	Source
1797	J.Hall; W.Alitson	Calvert & Co.	London–Bengal; London–Martinique	LR
1799	Goodwin	Latham & Son	London–Demerara	LR

== Fate ==
Lloyd's List reported that Three Sisters, Goodwin, master, was on her way from London to Barbados when she was lost in Orchard's Bay in the Isle of Wight. Three men had drowned.
