= HMS Lively (1794) =

UK sailing frigate 1794–1798

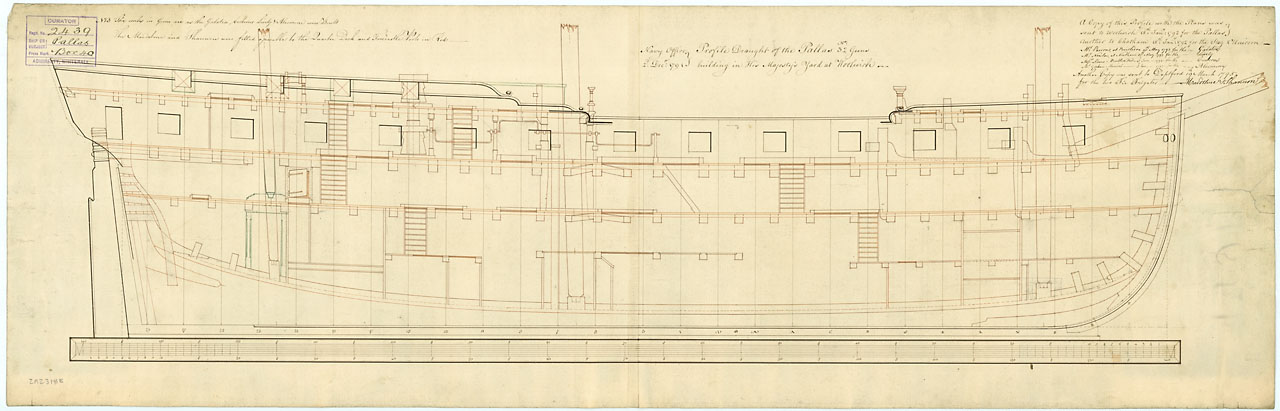
- Lively

History

Great Britain
- Name: HMS Lively
- Ordered: 14 February 1793
- Builder: John Nowlan, Northam, Devon
- Laid down: April 1793
- Launched: 23 October 1794
- Honours and awards: Naval General Service Medal (NGSM) with clasps: "St. Vincent"; "29 May Boat Service 1797".
- Fate: Wrecked, subsequently burnt 14 April 1798

General characteristics
- Class & type: 32-gun Alcmene-class fifth-rate frigate
- Tons burthen: 80585/94 (bm)
- Length: 135 ft 3 in (41.22 m) (overall); 112 ft 5 1/4 in (34.3 m) (keel)
- Beam: 36 ft 8 1/2 in (11.189 m)
- Draught: Unladen: 9 ft 11 in (3.02 m); Laden: 14 ft 0 in (4.27 m)
- Depth of hold: 12 ft 6 in (3.81 m)
- Propulsion: Sails
- Sail plan: Full-rigged ship
- Complement: 241; 254 post-1796
- Armament: Upper deck: 26 × 18-pounder guns; QD: 4 × 6-pounder guns + 4 × 24-pounder carronades; Fc: 2 × 6-pounder bow chasers + 2 × 24-pounder carronades

HMS Lively was a 32-gun fifth-rate Alcmene-class frigate of the British Royal Navy launched on 23 October 1794 at Northam. She took part in three actions – one a single-ship action, one a major battle, and one a cutting-out boat expedition – that would in 1847 qualify her crews for the issuance of the Naval General Service Medal. Lively was wrecked in 1798.

== Service ==
Lively was commissioned in October 1794 under Captain Viscount Lord Garlies. On 4 March 1795 she captured the French corvette Espion about 13 leagues (63 km) off Ushant. Espion was armed with eighteen 6-pounder guns and had a crew of 140 men. She was five days out of Brest on a cruise. (Note: Espion was the French privateer Robert, which the British had captured in 1793 and taken into service as Espion, and which the French had recaptured in 1794. The British took Espion back into service but under the name Spy.) Captain George Burlton, acting in the absence of Lord Garlies, who was sick on shore, commanded Lively. Four days later Lively recaptured the ship Favonius.

On 13 March 1795 she captured the French corvette Tourterelle. Lively sighted three vessels and headed for the larger one, which tacked to meet her. After three hours of exchanging fire the French vessel was so disabled that she struck. She turned out to be the 28-gun corvette Tourterelle, under the command of Lieutenant Antoine Marie François Montalan. She had lost 16 men killed and 25 wounded; Lively had only two men wounded. The British took Tourterelle into service as HMS Tourterelle. The Admiralty would recognize the action in 1847 with the award of the Naval General Service Medal with clasp "Lively 13 March 1795". Lively also captured the other two vessels that Tourterelle had been escorting. They had been prizes to Espion.

Lively captured the Danish ship Concordia on 27 February 1796 but had to share the prize money with 13 allied ships that were in sight at the time.

Lively was present at the Battle of Cape St. Vincent under the command of Captain Lord Garlies. She and three other British frigates jointly fired on a Spanish ship of the line that had become separated from the rest, but other than that Lively took no significant part in the combat and suffered no losses. Her main function was to repeat signals. She did take possession of San Ysidro (or San Isidro), one of the Spanish vessels that surrendered. In 1847 the Admiralty authorized the issuance of the NGSM with clasp "St. Vincent" to the 348 surviving claimants from the battle.

In 1797 Captain Benjamin Hallowell assumed command. On 29 May, during the battle for Santa Cruz, Lieutenant Thomas Hardy led a cutting out party using boats from Minerve and Lively to capture the French 16-gun corvette Mutine. The cutting out party boarded and captured the vessel; they then sailed her out of the port to the British fleet under heavy fire from shore and naval guns. Hardy was wounded during the action, as were 14 of the other British officers and men in the cutting out party. The British subsequently commissioned Mutine under her existing name with Hardy as commander. In 1847 the Admiralty authorized the issuance of the NGSM with clasp "29 May Boat Service 1797" to the three surviving claimants from Lively and Minerve.

In October 1797 Minerva and Lively captured Marselloise as she was sailing from Guadeloupe to France. They then took the richly-laden former Sugar Cane into Martinique.

On 5 January 1798, Mercury captured the 16-gun privateer Benjamin. Alcmene, Thalia and Lively joined the chase and shared in the capture.

== Fate ==
On 12 April 1798, Lively was under the command of Captain James Nicoll Morris when she was wrecked on Rota Point off Cádiz. She and Seahorse were patrolling to intercept any ships trying to enter or leave the port. During the night she grounded and despite all efforts by Seahorse, Lively could not be pulled off. In the morning of 14 April it became apparent that Spanish gunboats were marshalling, while shore batteries started to fire on the British vessels and the boats transferring the crew to Seahorse. Morris then set fire to Lively as he left. In the process, only one man was lost. The subsequent court martial acquitted Morris and his officers of all blame.

== Bibliography ==
- Grocott, Terence (1997). Shipwrecks of the revolutionary & Napoleonic eras. Chatham. ISBN 1-86176-030-2.
- Hepper, David J. (1994). British Warship Losses in the Age of Sail, 1650–1859. Rotherfield: Jean Boudriot. ISBN 0-948864-30-3.
- James, William (1837). The Naval History of Great Britain, from the Declaration of War by France in 1793, to the Accession of George IV. R. Bentley.
- Jackson, Thomas Sturges (1899). Logs of the great sea fights, 1794–1805. Vol. 16. Printed for the Navy Records Society.
- Quintin, Danielle & Quintin, Bernard (2003). Dictionnaire des capitaines de Vaisseau de Napoléon (in French). S.P.M. ISBN 2-901952-42-9.
- Winfield, Rif (2008). British Warships in the Age of Sail 1793–1817: Design, Construction, Careers and Fates. Seaforth. ISBN 978-1-86176-246-7.
