= King and Queen Shipyard =

18th century shipyard in Rotherhithe, London

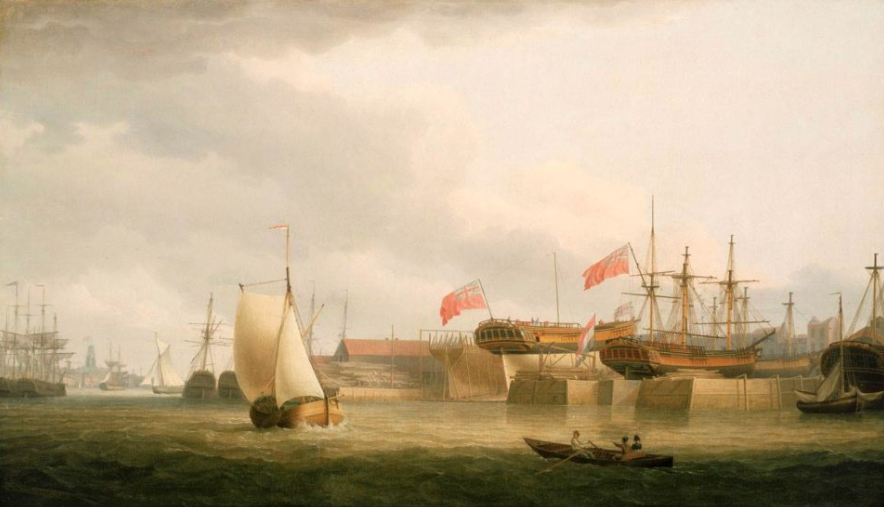
King and Queen Shipyard in 1792, painted by Thomas Whitcombe

The King and Queen Shipyard was an eighteenth century shipyard in Rotherhithe, London. For many years it was owned by Peter Everitt Mestaer

There was a dry dock here which dated back at least to 1663. This was adjacent to the King and Queen public house, which also gave its name to the King and Queen Watermen's Stairs. The pub closed in 1942, and both the building and the stairs were probably destroyed by bombs during the Second World War.

== Ships built at the King and Queen Shipyard ==
Date launched	Name	Type	For
11 June 1778	HMS Incendiary	Fireship	Royal Navy
12 September 1779	HMS Mercury	Enterprise-class frigate	Royal Navy
March 1794	HMS Pylades	Sloop	Royal Navy
24 February 1796	Princess Charlotte	East Indiaman	East India Company
12 September 1809	Astell	East Indiaman	
