= French ship Duquesne (1788) =

Ship of the line of the French Navy

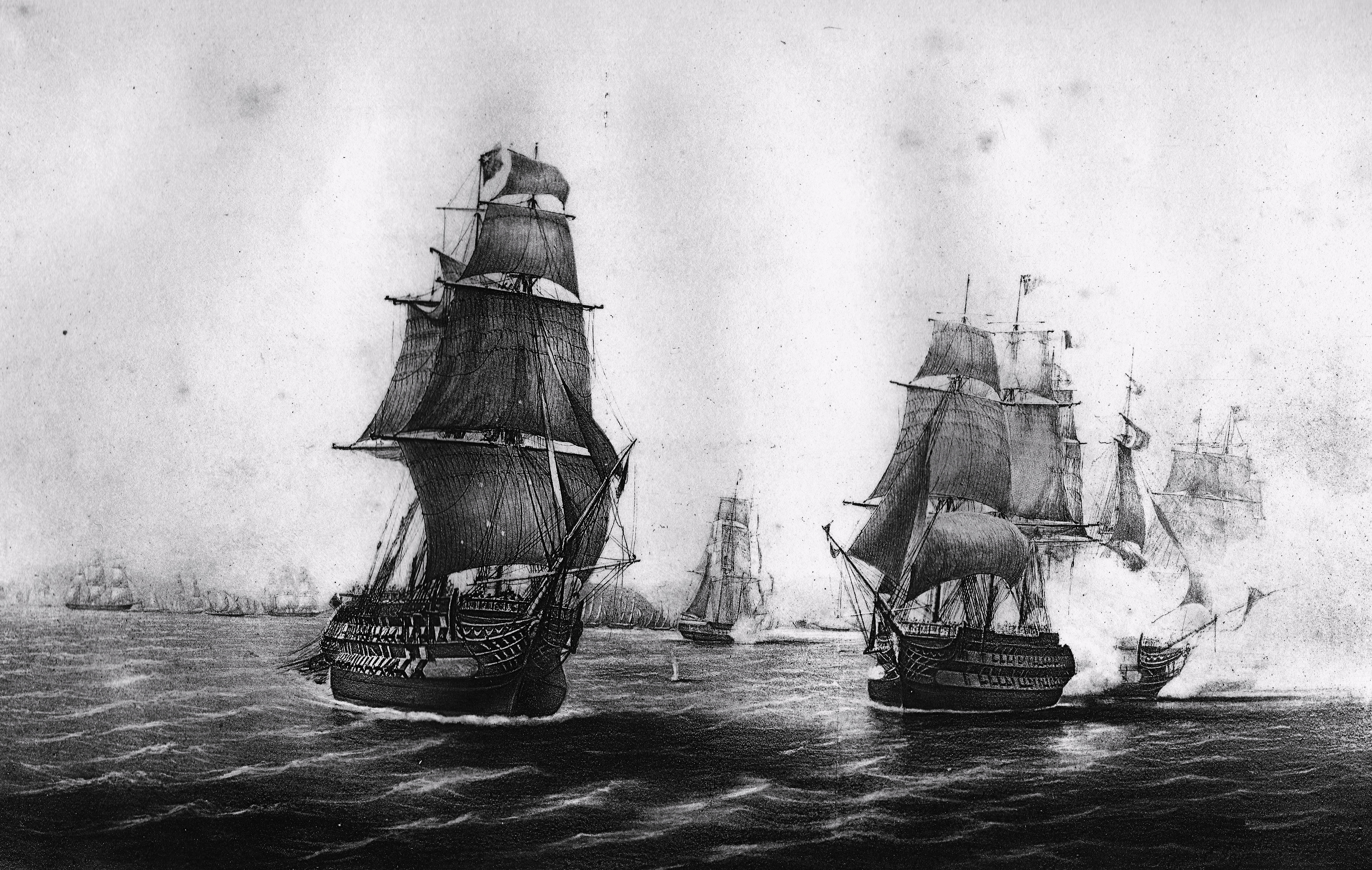
- Duquesne at the action of 2 April 1794

History

France
- Name: Duquesne
- Namesake: Abraham Duquesne
- Laid down: January 1788
- Launched: 2 September 1788
- In service: 1789
- Captured: 24 July 1803

United Kingdom
- Name: HMS Duquesne
- Acquired: Captured, 24 July 1803
- Fate: Broken up, July 1805

General characteristics
- Class & type: Téméraire-class ship of the line
- Displacement: 3,069 tonneaux
- Tons burthen: 1,537 port tonneaux
- Length: 55.87 m (183 ft 4 in)
- Beam: 14.46 m (47 ft 5 in)
- Draught: 7.15 m (23.5 ft)
- Depth of hold: 7.15 m (23 ft 5 in)
- Sail plan: Full-rigged ship
- Crew: 705
- Armament: 74 muzzle-loading, smoothbore guns: Lower gun deck: 28 × 36 pdr guns; Upper gun deck: 30 × 18 pdr guns; Forecastle and Quarterdeck: 16 × 8 pdr guns

Duquesne was a 74-gun Téméraire-class ship of the line built for the French Navy during the 1780s. Completed in 1789, she played a minor role in the French Revolutionary and Napoleonic Wars. She was captured by the British in 1803, and broken up in 1805.

== Description ==
The Téméraire-class ships had a length of 55.87 metres (183 ft 4 in), a beam of 14.46 metres (47 ft 5 in) and a depth of hold of 7.15 metres (23 ft 5 in). The ships displaced 3,069 tonneaux and had a mean draught of 7.15 metres (23 ft 5 in). They had a tonnage of 1,537 port tonneaux. Their crew numbered 705 officers and ratings during wartime. They were fitted with three masts and ship rigged.

The muzzle-loading, smoothbore armament of the Téméraire class consisted of twenty-eight 36-pounder long guns on the lower gun deck, thirty 18-pounder long guns and thirty 18-pounder long guns on the upper gun deck. On the quarterdeck and forecastle were a total of sixteen 8-pounder long guns. Beginning with the ships completed after 1787, the armament of the Téméraires began to change with the addition of four 36-pounder obusiers on the poop deck (dunette). Some ships had instead twenty 8-pounders.

== Construction and career ==
Duquesne was ordered on 19 January 1788 and laid down at the Arsenal de Toulon later that month. The ship was launched on 2 September and completed the following year. In 1795, under Captain Allemand, she took part in the Battle of Cape Noli, and in the Battle of Hyères Islands. From mid-1801, she was armed en flûte and used as a troop ship. On 22 November 1802, she departed Toulon, bound to Saint-Domingue under Commodore Quérangal, along with Guerrière and Duguay-Trouin.

The flotilla found itself caught in the blockade of Saint-Domingue by the British ships Elephant, Bellerophon, Theseus, Vanguard, and Tartar. Guerrière and Duguay-Trouin managed to escape, and Duquesne, separated from the squadron, attempted to flee in the night. She was discovered by Tartar and Vanguard the next afternoon, and after a short artillery duel, Duquesne, outnumbered by her opponents, struck her colours. Duquesne was incorporated in the Royal Navy as HMS Duquesne. In 1804, she ran aground on the Morant Cays. She was refloated in 1805, and sailed to England to be broken up.
