= Peter Everitt Mestaer =

Peter Everitt Mestaer (1763–1818) was a London ship builder and ship owner who owned the King and Queen Shipyard in Rotherhithe. He had two homes: a town house at 28 New Broad Street and Oak House, a country house in Wanstead. He also had other property in Rotherhithe, including a local public house.
