= HMS Espoir (1797) =

Brig of the Royal Navy

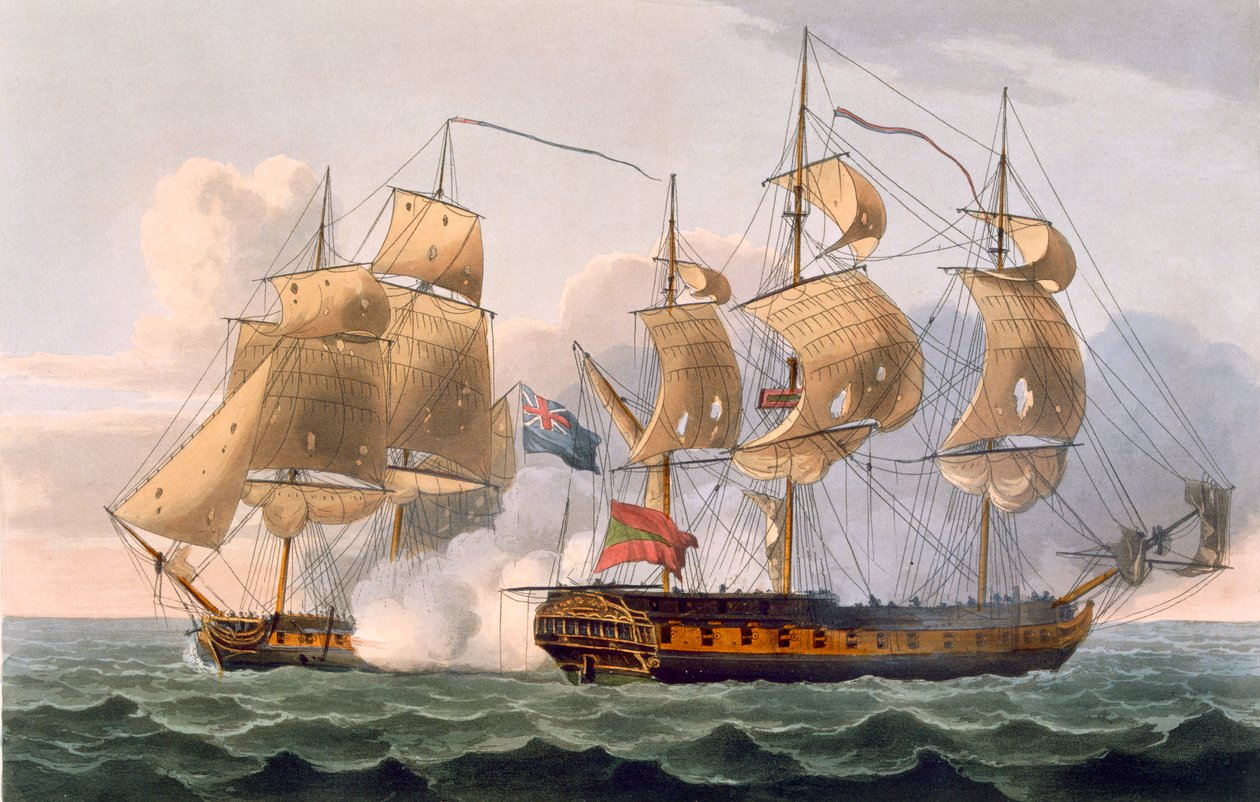
- Capture of the Liguria, August 7th 1798, Thomas Whitcombe

History

France
- Name: Espoir
- Builder: Bayonne
- Laid down: December 1787
- Launched: March 1788
- Completed: April 1788
- Renamed: Lazouski, 28 September 1793; Espoir, 30 May 1795
- Captured: By Thalia, 18 September 1797

Great Britain
- Name: HMS Espoir
- Acquired: by capture, 18 September 1797
- Commissioned: June 1798
- Decommissioned: December 1799
- Honours and awards: Naval General Service Medal with clasp "Espoir 7 Augt. 1798"
- Fate: Sold, September 1804

General characteristics
- Class & type: Hasard-class brig-sloop
- Tons burthen: 267 (bm)
- Length: 92 ft 10 in (28.3 m) (overall); 75 ft 1 in (22.9 m) (keel)
- Beam: 25 ft 10 in (7.9 m)
- Depth of hold: 10 ft 10 in (3.3 m)
- Complement: In French service (1794): 125; In British service (1797): 80
- Armament: In French service (1794): 12 × 6-pounder guns; In British service (1797): 14 × 6-pounder guns

Espoir was a 12-gun brig-aviso of the French Navy which was captured by HMS Thalia in September 1797. Commissioned into the Royal Navy as HMS Espoir, she captured three prizes, with the capture in 1798 of the more heavily armed Genoese pirate Liguria earning her crew a clasp to the Naval General Service Medal. Espoir was laid up in 1799 and sold in 1804.

== Construction ==
Espoir was one of six brig-sloops of the Hasard class, designed by Raymond-Antoine Haran. She was built in Bayonne between December 1787 and April 1788, and launched in March 1788. She originally mounted just 4-pounder guns and carried a crew of 5 officers and 65 ratings; by 1794 she carried twelve 6-pounder guns and 125 men.

== French service ==
Espoir cruised the coasts of Newfoundland while under the command of chevalier de Fabry, lieutenant de vaisseau, around 17 August 1790. Between 13 July 1792 and 12 January 1793, Espoir carried dispatches to Senegal, and then returned. At the time she was under the command of enseigne de vaisseau, later lieutenant de vaisseau, Martin.

Espoir sailed from Rochefort to Verdon, escorted a convoy from Verdon to Rochelle, cruised and conducted escorts on the coasts of Poitou and la Charente, and between Rochefort and Bayonne, and escorted a convoy from France to Cayenne. Between 5 February and 17 July 1793 she was under the command of lieutenant de vaisseau Charles-Nicolas Lacaille; in August her commander was lieutenant de vaisseau Vignier.

Espoir was renamed Lazouski (or Lazousky) on 28 September 1793 (in honour of Revolutionary leader Claude François Lazowski). She escorted convoys between Bayonne and Brest, cruised in the Bay of Biscay and south of Ireland, and was at Rochefort. From 1 January 1794 to 22 May, she was under the command of enseigne de vaisseau, later lieutenant de vaisseau, Farjanel. Then between 27 May and 8 September her captain was enseigne de vaisseau non entretenu Barbé. On 26 May 1795 her captain was lieutenant de vaisseau Barrère. Under his command Lazouski, based at Rochefort, cruised the Gulf of Gascony, and escorted a convoy from Rochelle to Pasajes.

Lazouski reverted to the name Espoir on 30 May 1795. Around 15 July, while under the command of Lieutenant de vaisseau Goyeteche, Espoir escorted merchant vessels from Saint-Jean-de-Luz to Bayonne.

From 20 August 1797 until her capture, Espoir was under the command of enseigne de vaisseau Pairaudeau. He sailed her to Cayenne, and then cruised east of Bermuda.

== Capture ==
Thalia, under Captain Lord Henry Paulet, captured Espoir in the Mediterranean on 18 September 1797. She had sailed from Cayenne and earlier had been in company with the French corvette Gaité, which however the British frigate HMS Arethusa had captured on 10 August. Thalia shared the prize money for Espoir with Romulus and Mahonesa.

== British service ==
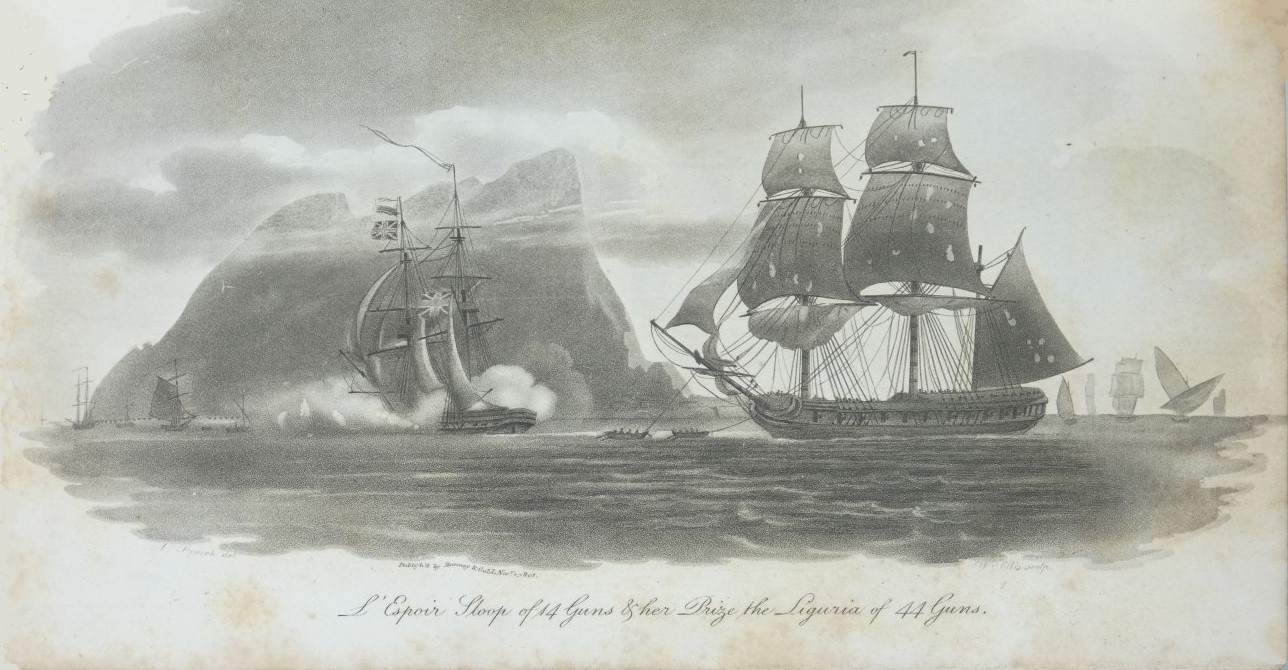
1801 illustration of Espoir engaging Liguria by Nicholas Pocock

The British rearmed Espoir with fourteen 6-pounder guns and gave her a crew of 80 men. She was commissioned in June 1798 in the Mediterranean under Commander Loftus Otway Bland.

On 7 August she was escorting the Oran convoy when she encountered the 26-gun Genoese ship Liguria some three leagues off Cape Windmill. Bland sailed to meet the vessel, which ordered him to surrender and then fired on Espoir. Liguria mounted twelve 18-pounder guns, four 12-pounder guns, and ten 6-pounder guns. She also carried 12 wall guns and four swivel guns. Lastly, she had a crew of 120 men. She thus outgunned and outnumbered Espoir. After several broadsides and some lulls, lasting in all perhaps four hours, Liguria struck her colours. She had lost her boatswain and six men killed, and 14 men wounded, including her captain, Don Francisco de Orso dangerously so. Espoir lost her master killed, and had six men wounded, of whom two were badly wounded. Liguria was a Dutch frigate that had been sold to the Genoese.

Bland received a promotion to post-captain, with seniority of 25 September 1798. In 1847 the Admiralty issued the clasp "Espoir 7 Augt. 1798" to the Naval General Service Medal to the one surviving claimant from that action.

Corso shared in the prize money for Liguria. Then on 18 October, Espoir and Corso captured the Madonna de Ydra.

On 29 October, between Tarifa and Tangiers, Espoir captured the 8-gun cutter Fulminante, which had had the "impudence" (in Bland's words) to attack Espoir. Admiral Jervis, Earl of St Vincent, needing an advice boat, took her into service the next day as Fulminante. Fulminante had a short career, being wrecked on the Egyptian coast on 24 March 1801.

On 2 December 1798, Espoir's boats assisted Corso in bringing off a small French privateer that Corso had run ashore about three leagues east of Malabar Bay, near Gibraltar. When the boarding party arrived at the vessel they found that her crew had deserted her. The privateer was armed with two carriage guns, two swivels, and small arms. Corso and Espoir shared the prize money for the vessel.

In late 1798 or early 1799, command of Espoir transferred to Commander James Sanders. (When Bland handed over command he reported that he considered Espoir to be unseaworthy.

Under Sanders's command she took her last prize on 22 February 1799, the Spanish 14-gun xebec Africa some three leagues from Marbello on the Spanish coast. Espoir sighted two xebecs and a brig. One of the two xebecs hoisted Spanish colours and it and the brig formed in line ahead to engage Espoir. (They had cast off a Moorish vessel, which was a prize.) After exchanging broadsides with the xebec and the brig, Espoir was able to bring the xebec Africa, Captain Josepho Subjado, to close action. Africa mounted 14 long Spanish 4-pounder guns and four brass 4-pounder swivels, and had a crew of 75 seamen and 38 soldiers from Algosamus, bound to Malaga. After exchanging fire for an hour and a half, Espoir seized the opportunity to board Africa. The British captured the xebec after a 20-minute fight on board. Africa's two consorts effected their escape; the fleeing brig alone had 18 guns. Espoir lost two seamen killed and two wounded. Africa lost one officer and eight seamen killed, and her commander, two other officers and 25 seamen wounded. Majestic was in sight and her commander, Captain Cuthbert, transmitted Sanders's letter, adding his own endorsement extolling "the meritorious Conduct of Captain Sanders and his Ship's Company on the Occasion." Espoir and Majestic shared the prize money for the xebec, whose full name was Nostra Senora de Africa.

On 12 May Espoir arrived at Palermo bearing the news that the French fleet had been sighted off Oporto and was believed to be sailing to the Mediterranean. In June Espoir was off Cape delle Melle with Lord Keith's fleet. Although the frigate Emerald had run into Espoir during the night, stoving in her larboard side, Espoir still took part in Keith's squadron's pursuit of a French squadron in the action of 18 June 1799. Espoir later shared in the prize money for the capture of the three frigates Courageux, Alceste, and Junon, and the two French brigs Alerte and Salamine.

While at Gibraltar Sanders observed Spanish gunboats capture a merchant brig between Cabrita Point and Ceuta. He set out at sunset and recaptured the brig, while sinking one of the gunboats. He went on to save several English merchant vessels from the Algeciras flotilla and captured or destroyed several privateers and trading vessels. Some of these encounters involved an action but none resulted in material injury or damage to Espoir.

== Fate ==
Espoir arrived in Sheerness on 14 October and was paid off in December. She then went into dock. Here several feet of her counter fell out when the copper was removed, bearing out Bland's earlier condemnation of her condition. Espoir was laid up in December. She was sold at Sheerness in September 1804.
