= Lawrence Halsted =

Royal Navy Admiral (1764–1841)

Admiral Sir Lawrence Halstead GCB
- Born: 2 April 1764; Gosport, Hampshire
- Died: 22 April 1841 (aged 77); Stoke, Devon
- Relatives: John Halsted (brother)
- Military career
- Allegiance: United Kingdom
- Branch: Royal Navy
- Service years: 1776–1841
- Rank: Admiral
- Commands: HMS Atalanta; HMS Crown; HMS Hector; HMS London; HMS Venus; HMS Phoenix; HMS Namur; West Indies Station
- Conflicts: American Revolutionary War; Battle of St. Lucia; Battle of the Saintes; French Revolutionary Wars; Atlantic campaign of May 1794; Napoleonic Wars; Battle of Cape Ortegal; Atlantic campaign of 1806
- Awards: Knight Grand Cross of the Order of the Bath

Admiral Sir Lawrence William Halsted GCB (2 April 1764 – 22 April 1841) was an officer of the Royal Navy who served during the American War of Independence and the French Revolutionary and Napoleonic Wars.

Halsted was the son of a naval officer and served with his father during the first years of the war in America. After his father's death he served under Captain Richard Onslow and was present at the engagements with the Comte d'Estaing and the Comte de Grasse in the West Indies and off the coast of North America. He survived various battles and a hurricane in the Atlantic in 1782, and by the end of the wars had risen to lieutenant.

He received his first independent commands while serving in the East Indies in the inter-war years, and after spending time as a flag captain during the early years of the French Revolutionary Wars, moved on to command a number of frigates. Halsted went on to achieve particular success aboard HMS Phoenix, and was rewarded with command of a squadron. Ships under his overall command captured two Dutch ships and destroyed several others in the North Sea in 1796, and after a successful period against privateers off Ireland, he moved to the Mediterranean. Here he helped to capture or destroy several French frigates, and by 1805 had command of a ship of the line. He took part in the defeat of a French squadron that had escaped Trafalgar at the Battle of Cape Ortegal, before serving as a captain of the fleet to Vice-Admiral Sir Charles Cotton. Halsted was soon advanced to flag rank himself, and served as commander in chief in the West Indies while a vice-admiral. After a long and distinguished career, Lawrence Halsted died in 1841 with the rank of admiral of the blue.

== Family and early life ==
Halsted was born in Gosport on 2 April 1764, the son of naval officer Captain William Anthony Halsted, and his wife Mary, née Frankland. Three of Lawrence's brothers had naval careers; Charles Halsted became a lieutenant and was lost with HMS Blanche in 1780, John Halsted became a captain, and George Halsted rose to be a commander. The elder Halsted was appointed commander of the former 60-gun HMS Jersey in March 1776. Jersey had been fitted out as a hospital ship and assigned to Lord Howe's fleet for service off North America, and Halsted took his son with him as a midshipman. Lawrence served with his father for the next two years, and participated in a number of naval operations along the American coast before his transfer into Captain Richard Onslow's 64-gun HMS St Albans on 25 May 1778. Halsted's father died shortly after this, but Onslow took on the role of patron, and the two sailed to the West Indies with Commodore William Hotham's squadron to join Admiral Samuel Barrington.

Halsted was aboard St Alban's during Barrington's clashes with the Comte d'Estaing including at St Lucia on 15 December 1778 before his ship was ordered back to England with a convoy. St Albans was paid off shortly after her arrival, and her crew were transferred to the 74-gun HMS Bellona. Halsted was rated master's mate during his time on the Bellona, and was present at the battle with the 54-gun Dutch ship Princess Caroline on 30 December 1780. The Princess Caroline was captured and taken into the Royal Navy as HMS Princess Caroline. Lawrence's good service was rewarded with his lieutenant's commission dated 8 December 1781 and an appointment to the newly commissioned Princess Caroline, now under Captain Hugh Bromedge.

== Lieutenancy ==
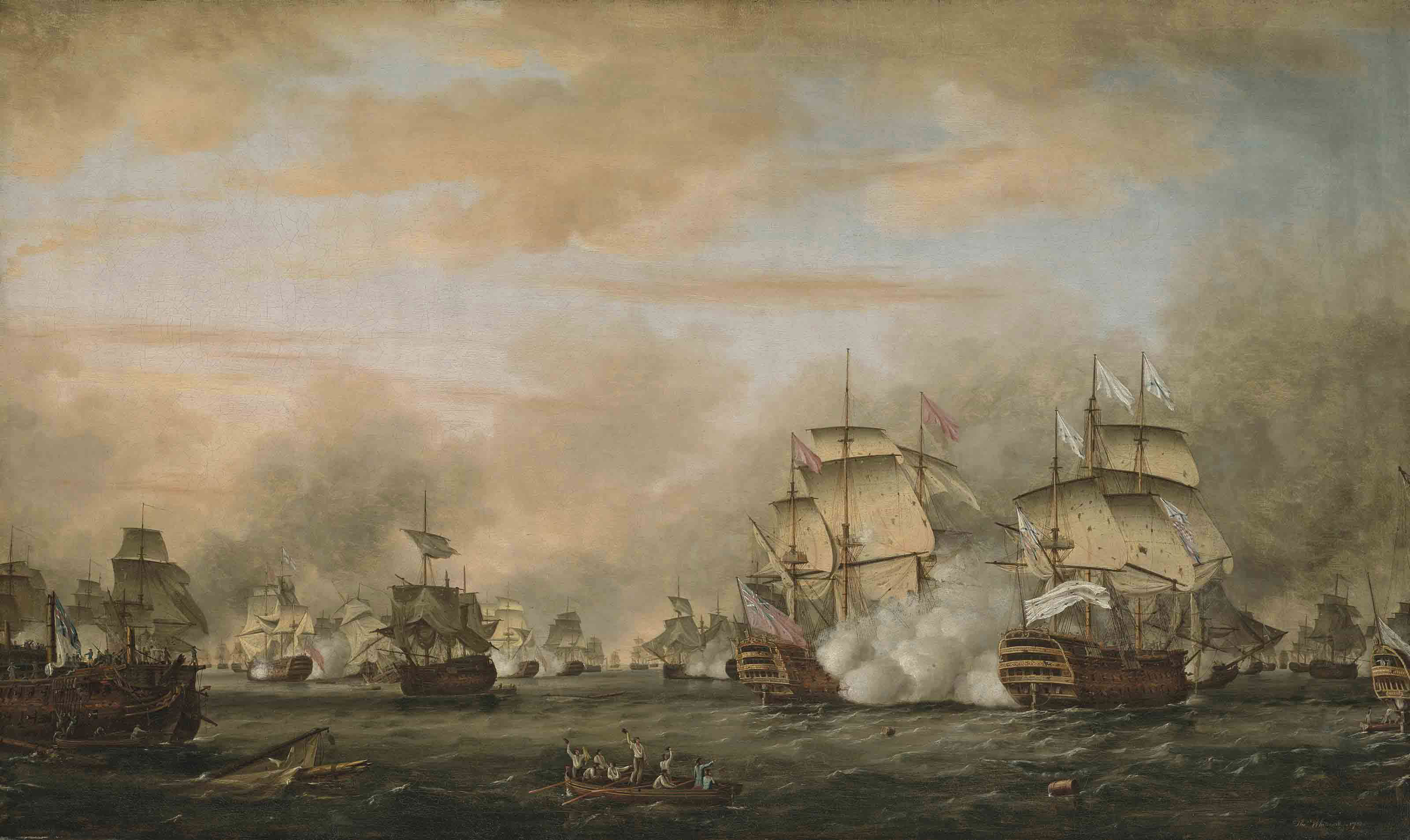
The Battle of the Saintes, depicted by Thomas Whitcombe

Princess Caroline went out to the West Indies as a convoy escort, after which Halsted moved aboard the 74-gun HMS Canada under Captain the Honourable William Cornwallis. With Cornwallis, Halsted saw action at the Battle of the Saintes on 9–12 April 1782, during which battle Canada was heavily engaged with the French Ville de Paris, flagship of the Comte de Grasse. Ville de Paris was captured by the British and Canada was one of the ships assigned to escort a convoy of captured French ships and damaged British ships back to Britain. The ships were caught in a hurricane during the voyage across the Atlantic, and the Ville de Paris and HMS Centaur foundered, while HMS Ramillies had to be abandoned and burnt. Canada survived the storm and made it back to England to be paid off in January 1783.

Halsted's next appointment was to the 74-gun HMS Ganges, still serving under Captain Cornwallis. He remained aboard Ganges for the next five years, with Ganges initially employed as a guardship, before moving to Gibraltar and finally paying off in December 1787. Halsted now entered a brief period of unemployment, which lasted until 18 November 1788 when he joined Cornwallis's new ship, the 64-gun HMS Crown, as his first-lieutenant and went with him to the East Indies. Cornwallis was commodore in the East Indies, and after continued good service under his command, Halsted was promoted to commander on 20 October 1790 and given command of the sloop HMS Atalanta.

== First commands ==
Halsted was at first engaged in surveying off the Indian coast, before being promoted to post-captain and given command of Crown. He remained in Crown for a brief period, before resuming his command of Atalanta in order to complete his survey work, also using the sloop HMS Swan for the purpose. He returned to England aboard Swan in early 1793 and paid her off in May.

The French Revolutionary Wars had by now broken out, and Halsted was quickly appointed as acting-captain of HMS Invincible under Rear-Admiral John MacBride. He was soon moved aboard HMS Flora and remained in her until April 1794, when he joined the 74-gun HMS Hector as flag-captain to Rear-Admiral George Montagu. Halsted and Montagu took part in the naval manoeuvres of the Atlantic campaign of May 1794, but were not directly engaged at the Glorious First of June, where the British fleet under Lord Howe defeated the French under Villaret de Joyeuse. Halsted followed Montagu when he shifted his flag to the 98-gun HMS London, and the two served with the Channel Fleet until 1795. Halsted was appointed to command the 32-gun HMS Venus in February 1795, and went on to serve in the Channel and in the North Sea. He took over the 36-gun HMS Phoenix in October that year, and spent the rest of the French Revolutionary wars in command.

== HMS Phoenix ==
=== Phoenix and Argo ===
Phoenix was at first attached to the fleet under Admiral Adam Duncan, operating in the North Sea. In May 1796 news reached Duncan that a Dutch squadron consisting of the 36-gun Argo and three brigs and a cutter had departed Flickerve, Norway, bound for the Texel. Duncan despatched a squadron of his own to intercept them, consisting of Phoenix, the 50-gun HMS Leopard, the 28-gun HMS Pegasus and the brig-sloop HMS Sylph, and under the overall command of Halsted. The Dutch were intercepted at 5am of 12 May, with Phoenix and Leopard chasing Argo, while Pegasus and Sylph made after the brigs. Leopard eventually fell some way behind, and consequently it was Phoenix alone which brought Argo to action at 8am. After twenty minutes of fighting Halsted forced Argo to strike her colours. Phoenix had suffered one man killed and three wounded, while Argo had six killed and 28 wounded. Meanwhile, Pegasus and Sylph forced two of the brigs aground and took the small vessel accompanying the Dutch, which turned out to be a former British vessel, Duke of York. They then captured the third brig, the 16-gun Mercury. The Royal Navy took Argo and Mercury into service, Argo became HMS Janus and Mercury became HMS Hermes.

After this success Halsted was assigned to operate off the Irish coast, where he captured a number of privateers including the 4-gun Espiègle off Waterford on 18 May 1797, the 1-gun Brave off Cape Clear on 24 April 1798, the 20-gun Caroline on 31 May 1798, and the 20-gun Foudroyant on 23 January 1799.

=== Mediterranean ===
Phoenix then went out to the Mediterranean and continued to be active against French privateers. On 11 February 1799 she and the fireship HMS Incendiary captured the 10-gun Éole off Cape Spartel, while on 3 June 1800 Phoenix and HMS Port Mahon took the 14-gun Albanaise. The 4-gun Revanche was taken on 17 June, but she capsized the following day. Phoenix went on to join the fleet under Rear-Admiral Sir Richard Bickerton, and Halsted was appointed to command a squadron blockading Elba.

While sailing off Elba on the afternoon of 3 August Halsted's squadron, consisting of Phoenix, the 40-gun HMS Pomone under Captain Edward Leveson Gower and the 32-gun HMS Pearl under Captain Samuel James Ballard, intercepted a French convoy sailing off the west of the island. The convoy, which was bound from Porto Ercole to Porto Longone, was carrying ordnance stores and provisions, and was escorted by the 40-gun frigate Carrère, herself carrying 300 barrels of gunpowder. The British gave chase, ranging up on Carrère shortly after 8pm and opening fire. After 10 minutes of exchanging fire with Pomone Carrère surrendered. She was subsequently taken into the navy as HMS Carrere.

Phoenix continued off Elba, and on 31 August was observed alone anchored off Piombino, causing French General François Watrin to order the two French frigates anchored at Leghorn the Succès and Bravoure, to put to sea to attempt to capture her. The French ships did so, but early in the morning of 2 September they came across the 38-gun HMS Minerve under Captain George Cockburn, and chased her. Cockburn fled, signalling to Phoenix, which quickly got underway, accompanied by Pomone. Realising the situation the two French frigates attempted to flee, now pursued by their former quarry, Minerve. The Succès was unable to keep up with Bravoure, and ran aground off Vada. Minerve fired a shot at her as she passed by in pursuit of Bravoure, at which Succès promptly surrendered. Pomone ranged alongside to take possession of her, while Phoenix and Minerve chased Bravoure. The changing wind prevented the French vessel from regaining the safety of Leghorn, and she ran aground four miles south of the port. She was soon dismasted and wrecked. The British were able to get Succès off without much damage however. She had previously been HMS Success, and had been captured on 13 February 1801 by a French squadron under Honoré Ganteaume. She was duly readded to the navy under her old name. Halsted remained in the Mediterranean until paying off Phoenix in June 1802.

He married Emma Mary Pellew (1785–1835), eldest daughter of Sir Edward Pellew, on 7 Sep 1803 at Mylor parish church, Cornwall.

== Atlantic and Namur ==
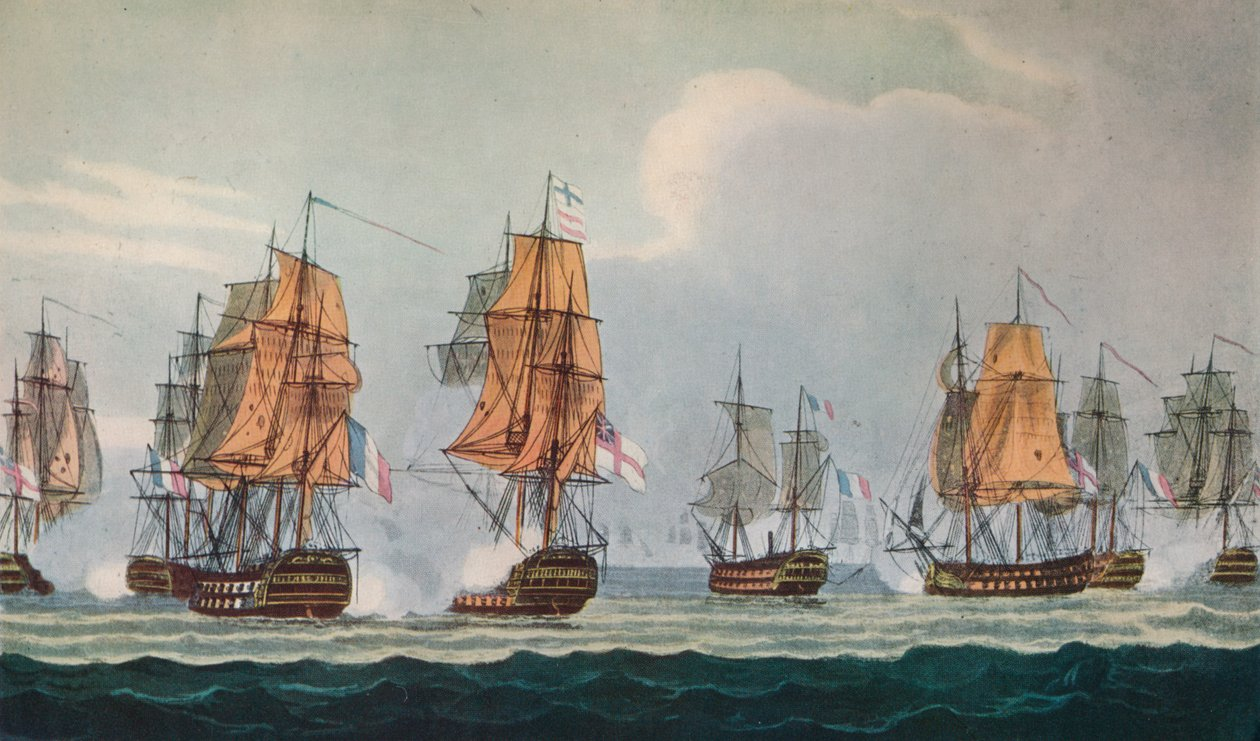
The Battle of Cape Ortegal, depicted by Thomas Whitcombe

Halsted was left unemployed during the Peace of Amiens, and did not receive another command until 16 March 1805, when he took command of HMS Namur, a former 90-gun ship that had been razeed to a 74-gun. She was assigned to Sir Richard Strachan's squadron, and while sailing off Cape Finisterre on 2 November, the squadron was joined by Halsted's old ship, Phoenix, now under Captain Thomas Baker. Baker reported that he had been chased by a squadron of four French ships of the line, and had lured them within range of Strachan's force. These four ships, under Rear-Admiral Pierre Dumanoir le Pelley, had escaped from the Franco-Spanish defeat at the Battle of Trafalgar on 21 October and were making their way to Rochefort. Strachan immediately took the bulk of his force in pursuit. The British eventually closed on the fleeing French on 4 November, though Namur took some time to come into action. She eventually joined the British line astern of HMS Courageux and ahead of Strachan's flagship HMS Caesar. In the ensuing Battle of Cape Ortegal several frigates attacked one side of the French line, while the ships of the line engaged the other, until the French were forced to surrender. Namur had four men killed and eight wounded in the action.

Halsted and Namur were then assigned to Sir John Borlase Warren's squadron during the Atlantic campaign of 1806, until Namur was paid off in July 1807. In December 1807 he became Captain of the Fleet to the commander of the Lisbon station, Vice-Admiral Sir Charles Cotton, serving aboard Cotton's flagship HMS Minotaur. The British fleet were engaged in blockading a Russian fleet under Admiral Dmitry Senyavin in the Tagus after the outbreak of the Anglo-Russian War, but the Convention of Sintra allowed them to sail to Portsmouth. Cotton moved his flag to HMS Hibernia in December 1808, taking Halsted with him.

== Flag rank and later life ==
Halsted was promoted to rear-admiral on 31 July 1810, advanced to vice-admiral on 4 June 1814 and was nominated Knight Commander of the Order of the Bath on 2 January 1815. He was appointed commander-in-chief in the West Indies in December 1824, succeeding Commodore Edward Owen in the post. Flying his flag during his time on the station aboard HMS Isis, he became a popular commander, and was rewarded with the thanks of the Jamaican House of Assembly and a service of plate from the merchants of the island at the end of his tenure. Halsted was promoted to admiral of the blue on 22 July 1830 and advanced to a Knight Grand Cross of the Order of the Bath on 24 February 1837, at the same time as being placed on the 'good service pension' list.

His wife Emma died in March 1835, leaving behind a large family. Sir Lawrence Halsted died at Stoke, Devon on 22 April 1841.

Two of Halsted's sons entered service in India, while two more followed him into the navy. One of his sons, Edward Pellew Halsted, reached the rank of vice-admiral and wrote a number of books, including a study of screw-propelled naval ships entitled The Screw-Fleet of the Navy. His youngest son, Lieutenant Lawrence G Halsted, died at Bombay on 7 November 1847 while aboard his ship, the steam sloop HMS Spiteful.

== Notes ==
Military offices
| Preceded by Edward Owen | Commander-in-Chief, West Indies; 1824–1827 | Succeeded by Charles Elphinstone Fleeming |
