= HMS Hermes =

Ten ships of the Royal Navy have been named HMS Hermes, after Hermes, the messenger god of Greek mythology, while another was planned:

- HMS Hermes (1796) was a 12-gun brig-sloop, originally the Dutch Mercurius, that HMS Sylph captured in 1796. Hermes foundered in 1797.
- HMS Hermes (1798) was a 22-gun ship purchased in 1798 and sold in 1802.
- HMS Hermes (1803) was a 16-gun sloop, originally the civilian Majestic launched in 1801 at Whitby. She was purchased in 1803 and sold in 1810.
- HMS Hermes (1811) was a 20-gun sixth rate launched in 1811 and burned in 1814 during a highly unsuccessful attack on Fort Bowyer at Mobile Point, Alabama.
- HMS Hermes was a wooden paddle packet, originally in civilian service as George IV. She was purchased in 1830 as HMS Courier (1830), renamed HMS Hermes in 1832, became a coal hulk and was renamed HMS Charger in 1835, and was broken up in 1854.
- HMS Hermes (1835) was a wooden paddle sloop launched in 1835, rebuilt in 1842 and broken up in 1864.
- HMS Hermes was a 74-gun third rate launched in 1816 as HMS Minotaur (1816), renamed HMS Hermes in 1866, and broken up in 1869.
- HMS Hermes (1898) was a Highflyer-class cruiser launched in 1898, converted into an experimental seaplane tender in 1913 and sunk by a German U-boat in 1914.
- HMS Hermes (95) was the first purpose-built aircraft carrier in the world to be launched, in 1919. She was sunk in the Indian Ocean by Japanese aircraft in 1942.
- HMS Hermes was to have been a Centaur-class aircraft carrier, but was cancelled in 1945.
- HMS Hermes (R12) was a Centaur-class aircraft carrier, originally planned as HMS Elephant, but renamed in 1945. She was launched in 1953 and served in the Falklands War. She was sold to the Indian Navy in 1986, who recommissioned her as INS Viraat until finally decommissioned in 2017
- HMS Hermes is the name given to the Queen Elizabeth-class aircraft carrier Ship Control Centre Training Simulator situated in the Defence School of Marine Engineering, HMS Sultan, Gosport. It was opened by Flag Officer Sea Training Rear Admiral WJ Warrinder on 28 October 2018. The simulator was built by L3 and is a representation of the Ship Control Centre of the class and is used to train ship staff in machinery operation principles.

== Battle honours ==
- Burma 1852
- Atlantic 1940
- Falkland Islands 1982
