= Hermes (ship) =

Several ships have been named Hermes for Hermes:

- HMS Hermes was the mercantile Hermes launched at Shields in 1797. The British Royal Navy purchased her in 1798 and sold her in 1802 after the Treaty of Amiens. She then returned to mercantile service as a West Indiaman. The French captured her in 1805.
- Hermes (1811 ship) was built in Quebec. She traded widely before she made two voyages as a whaler to the British Southern Whale Fishery. She was wrecked in 1822 during the second voyage.
- MV Hermes, later Pozarica, Empire Dove and Blue Fin, was a cargo ship launched in 1945

== See also ==
- HMS Hermes – any one of 10 vessels of the British Royal Navy
  - HMS Hermes (1811) – a 20 gun sailing ship built in 1811 that sunk Mouche
- USS Hermes – one vessel
