= HMS Phoenix (1783) =

Frigate of the Royal Navy

- An 1805 watercolor (shown here in black and white) probably depicting HMS Phoenix in chase of Didon

History

Great Britain
- Name: HMS Phoenix
- Builder: Parsons, Bursledon
- Launched: 15 July 1783
- Honours and awards: Naval General service Medal with clasp "Phoenix 10 Augt. 1805"
- Fate: Wrecked on 20 February 1816

General characteristics
- Class & type: Perseverance-class fifth-rate frigate
- Tons burthen: 884 10/94 (bm)
- Length: 137 ft 1 in (41.8 m) (overall); 113 ft 2 7/8 in (34.5 m) (keel)
- Beam: 38 ft 3 3/4 in (11.7 m)
- Depth of hold: 13 ft 5 in (4.1 m)
- Propulsion: Sails
- Complement: 270
- Armament: Gun deck: 26 × 18-pounder guns; QD: 8 × 9-pounder guns + 4 × 18-pounder carronades; Fc: 2 × 9-pounder guns + 4 × 18-pounder carronades

HMS Phoenix was a 36-gun Perseverance-class fifth-rate frigate of the Royal Navy. The shipbuilder George Parsons built her at Bursledon and launched her on 15 July 1783. She served in the French Revolutionary and Napoleonic Wars and was instrumental in the events leading up to the battle of Trafalgar. Phoenix was involved in several single-ship actions, the most notable occurring on 10 August 1805 when she captured the French frigate Didon, which was more heavily armed than her. She was wrecked, without loss of life, off Smyrna in 1816.

== Active service ==
She was commissioned in October 1787 under Captain John W. Payne, and paid off in December. Recommissioned in October 1788, she sailed for the East Indies in November under Captain George A. Byron.

=== East Indies ===
In the beginning of November 1791, Minerva, Commodore William Cornwallis, Phoenix, Captain Sir Richard Strachan, and Perseverance, Captain Isaac Smith, were off Tellicherry, a fort and anchorage situated a few leagues to the south of Mangalore. Cornwallis ordered Phoenix to stop and search the French frigate Résolue, which was escorting a number of merchant ships that the British believed were carrying military supplies to support Tippu Sultan. Résolue resisted Phoenix and a brief fight ensued before Résolue struck her colours. Résolue had 25 men killed and 40 wounded; Phoenix had six men killed and 11 wounded. There was no contraband on the French vessels. The French captain insisted on considering his ship as a British prize, so Cornwallis ordered Strachan to tow her into Mahé and return her to the French commodore. Phoenix came home in August 1793.

=== North Sea ===
On 27 November 1793, the ships of a squadron under the command of Captain Thomas Pasley of HMS Bellerophon captured Blonde. At the time of her capture Blonde was armed with 28 guns and had a crew of 210 men under the command of Citizen Gueria. A subsequent prize money notice listed the vessels that shared in the proceeds as Bellerophon, Vanguard, Phoenix, Latona, and Phaeton.

In December Phoenix captured the French East Indiaman Pauline, valued at £30,000, and brought her into Portsmouth.

Phoenix was commissioned in October 1795 under Captain Lawrence Halsted. At first she was attached to the fleet under Admiral Adam Duncan, operating in the North Sea. On 12 May 1796 at daybreak the 28-gun Pegasus and the brig-sloop Sylph brought Duncan the news that a Dutch squadron consisting of the 36-gun frigate Argo and three brigs had departed Flickeroe, Norway, bound for the Texel.

Duncan took his fleet to intercept the Dutch squadron, sending a squadron the included Phoenix, the 50-gun Leopard, Pegasus, and Sylph, and under the overall command of Halsted, northward of the Texel. The British intercepted the Dutch at 5am on 12 May. Phoenix and Leopard chased Argo, while Pegasus and Sylph made after the brigs. Leopard eventually fell some way behind, and consequently it was Phoenix alone that engaged Argo in the action of 12 May 1796 at 8am.

After twenty minutes of fighting Halsted forced Argo to strike her colours. Phoenix carried eight 32-pounder carronades in lieu of her lighter guns in the upper works as well as her main battery of twenty-six 18-pounders, and a crew of 271 men and boys. The only damage she sustained was in her rigging and sails, and her only loss was one man killed and three wounded. Argo was armed with 26 long 12-pounders, six long 6-pounders, and four brass 24-pounder carronades, with a crew of 237 men and boys, and thus was substantially outgunned. She lost six men killed and 28 wounded. The third rate Powerful then came up to assist Phoenix in dealing with the prisoners.

Phoenix also captured a cutter, which turned out to be the packet ship Duke of York, which Argo had captured the day before. Duke of York had been sailing from Yarmouth to Hamburg.

Meanwhile Pegasus and Sylph forced two of the brigs aground at Bosch, about 10 leagues east of the Texel; these were the Echo, of 18 guns and the De Grier of 14 guns. One floated off but then grounded and was last seen sending out distress signals.

Pegasus and Sylph then captured the third brig, the 16-gun Mercury. The Royal Navy took both Argo and Mercury into service, Argo became Janus while Mercury became Hermes.

After this success Halsted was assigned to operate off the Irish coast. On 12 February 1797 Phoenix was in company with HMS Unite, Stag, Triton and Scourge at the capture of the French privateer Difficile. She was armed with 18 guns and had a crew of 206 men. She was three days out of Brest. The same four ships also captured Jeune Emilie and Recovery.

On 18 May 1797 Phoenix captured the French privateer lugger Espiègle off Waterford. Espiègle was armed with four guns and had a crew of 38 men. she had captured a brig that Phoenix had recaptured and that had put her on the trail of the lugger.

On 24 April 1798 Phoenix captured the French privateer Brave. She was pierced for 22 guns and was carrying eighteen, mixed 12 and 18-pounders. Brave resisted capture, suffering several men killed and 14 wounded, before she surrendered. Phoenix had no casualties and suffered trifling damage to her sails and rigging. Brave had a crew of 160 men, and there were also some 50 English prisoners on board, none of whom were injured. Halsted described Brave as being "a very fine ship, of 600 Tons, is coppered, and sails exceedingly fast." The Navy took Brave into service as Arab. The next day, Phoenix recaptured Thetis, an American ship that had been sailing from Charlestown to London when Brave had captured her.

Then one month later, on 31 May, Phoenix captured the French privateer Caroline and her prize, the brig Henry. Halsted had been searching for Caroline after being alerted to her presence by the transport Success two days earlier. Caroline was only eight months old and a fast sailer, ten days out of Nantes. She was pierced for 20 guns, 16 and 6-pounders, but had thrown most overboard while trying to escape. She had a crew of 105 men. She had only captured Henry and a small Danish ship. Henry had been sailing to Jamaica when Caroline captured her on 3 May, on which day Phoenix had also sent in an American ship, Emily Grant that she had encountered a few days earlier. The Royal Navy took Caroline into service as the 18-gun sloop Fleche.

On 23 January 1799 Phoenix captured the 20-gun French privateer Foudroyant on the Irish station after a pursuit of some 12 hours that covered over 120 miles. She was pierced for 24 guns, but mounted 20 brass 12-pounder and iron 6-pounder guns, of which she jettisoned eight during the chase. She had been launched at Bordeaux about three months earlier and had sailed on this cruise about nine weeks earlier. During the cruise she had captured two English and one American vessel. The British vessels were the brig Malbridge, sailing from Martinique to London, and the brig Duncan, sailing from Halifax to London. The American vessel was the ship Argo, sailing from Sweden to Charlestown. The Royal Navy took Foudroyant into service as the 20-gun post ship Poulette.

On 5 April Phoenix captured the French privateer Coureur.

=== Mediterranean ===
On 11 February 1800 Phoenix and the fireship Incendiary captured the French privateer Éole off Cape Spartel. Éole was armed with 10 guns and had a crew of 89 men. She was ten days out of Guelon, Spain and had not taken any prizes.

In May Phoenix was part of a naval squadron at the Siege of Genoa (1800). The squadron consisted of HMS Minotaur, Phoenix, Mondovi, Entreprenante, and the tender Victoire, all under the command of Vice-Admiral Lord Keith. (Note: Victoire may have been the privateer of two guns and 28 men that HMS Mutine had captured near Genoa on 29 March 1800.)

On 3 June Phoenix and Port Mahon captured the 14-gun brig Albanaise. She was sailing from Toulon with provisions for Genoa when she encountered Port Mahon, which initiated the chase about 35 miles west of Corsica. The chase lasted until early evening when Phoenix came up as Albanaise was just six miles out of Porto Ferraio on Elba. Lieutenant Étienne Rolland fired two broadsides and then struck. (A subsequent court martial exonerated Rolland of the loss of his vessel.) The Royal Navy took her into service as HMS Albanaise.

On 17 June boats from Phoenix took the French naval vessel Revanche near Hieres Island in the Mediterranean. She was armed with four carriage guns and four swivel guns had a crew of 27 men. She was partly laden with brandy, wine, cheese and pork, two days from Toulon on her way to Malta with dispatches, which she threw overboard prior to her capture. In capturing Revanche Phoenix lost one man. Furthermore, Revanche capsized the next day, though there were no deaths.

On 16 September Phoenix captured the Spanish schooner Felix. She was armed with four guns and was carrying merchandise from Corunna to Veracruz.

On 14 February 1801, Phoenix captured the Danish ship Minerva. She was sailing from Ivica to Holmitand with a cargo of salt.

Later in 1801 Phoenix was involved in supporting operations for the British expedition to Egypt. Around 2 May she left her station off Porto-Ferrajo, which gave the French the opportunity to establish a blockade that lasted until 1 August when Sir John Borlase Warren with his squadron arrived to lift it.

On 3 August 1801 the frigates Phoenix, Pomone, and Pearl captured the Venetian-built but French 44-gun frigate Carrère and her crew of 356 men at the mouth of Elbe after a short fight. She was escorting a small convoy from Porto Ercole to Porto Longone. Pomone was the actual captor and lost two men dead, two more died of wounds shortly thereafter, and two more lightly wounded. Phoenix could not get close enough to do more than fire a few random shots and Pearl positioned herself between Carrerre and the port to cut her off if necessary.

The Royal Navy took Carrere into service under her own name but rated as an 18-pounder frigate of 36 guns. Frederick Lewis Maitland was her first captain.

Almost a month later, on 2 September, Phoenix, Pomone, and Minerve re-captured the frigate Success, a former British 32-gun fifth-rate frigate under the command of Monsieur Britel. (The French had captured Success in February, off Toulon.) They also ran onshore the 46-gun French frigate Bravoure, under the command of Monsieur Dordelin, but were unwilling to set her on fire because not all her crew had gotten off

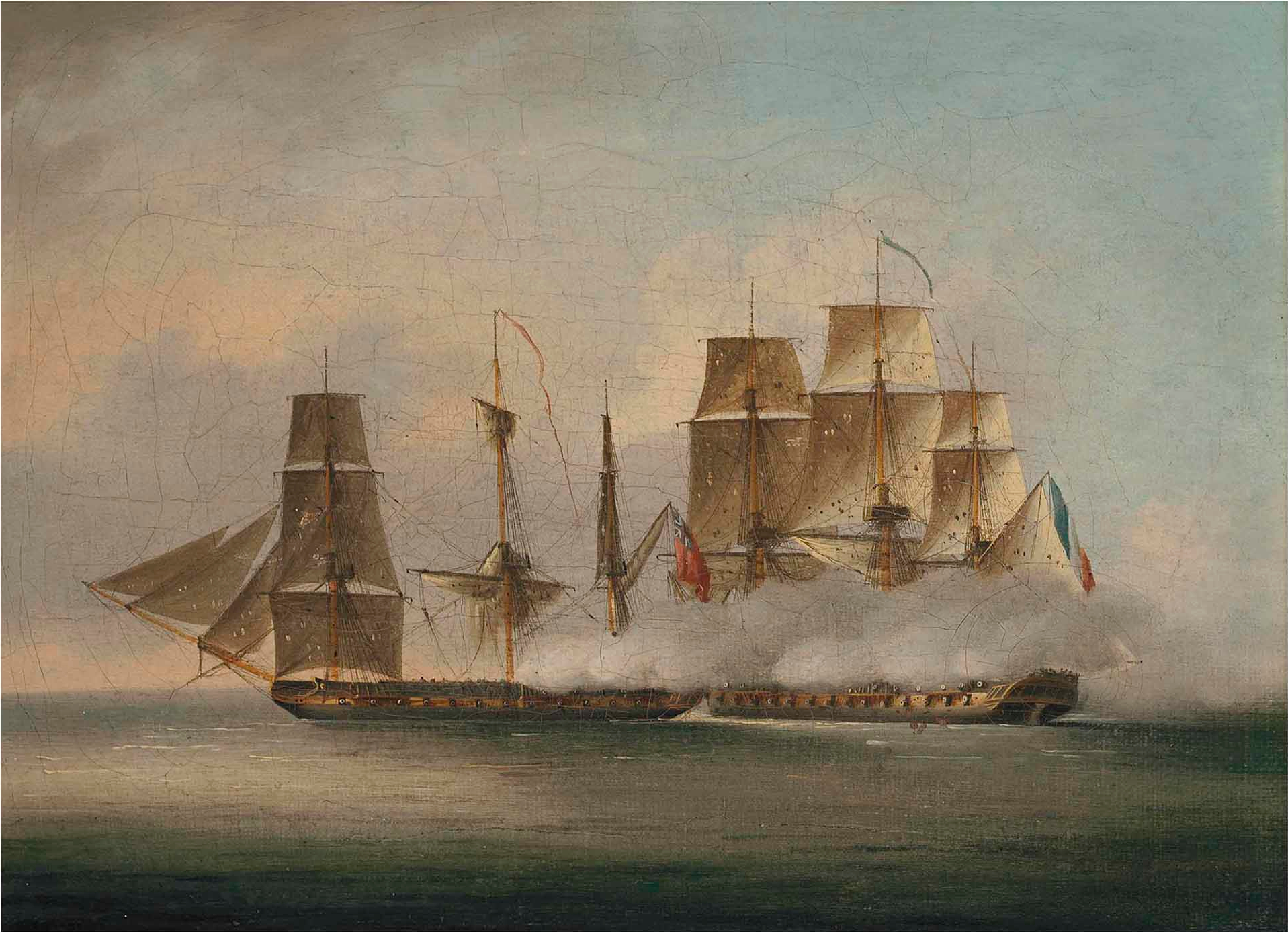
H.M. frigate Phoenix, 36 guns, attacking the French frigate La Didon, 44 guns, 10 August 1805, Francis Sartorius Jr.

Thomas Baker took command of Phoenix on 28 April 1803. He was assigned to the Channel Fleet under Admiral William Cornwallis, and on 10 August 1805 he came across the 40-gun French frigate Didon off Cape Finisterre.

Prior to the sighting Phoenix had intercepted an American merchant, en route from Bordeaux to the United States. The American master had been invited onto Phoenix, sold the British some of his cargo of wine, and had toured Phoenix before being allowed to continue on his way. Phoenix had at this time been altered to resemble from a distance a large sloop-of-war. Didon, which was carrying despatches instructing Rear-Admiral Allemand's five ships of the line to unite with the combined Franco-Spanish fleet under Vice-Admiral Pierre-Charles Villeneuve, intercepted the American merchant and from him received news that a 20-gun British ship was at sea and might be foolish enough to attack Didon.

Didon's commander, Frigate Captain Pierre Milius, decided to await the arrival of the British ship, and take her as a prize. On 10 August 1805, the two vessels met off Cape Finisterre.

Phoenix was able to approach and engage Didon before the French realised that she was a larger frigate than they had anticipated. The action lasted several hours, with Baker on one occasion having his hat shot off his head. Finally the French surrendered at 43°16′N 12°14′W. Phoenix had 12 killed and 28 wounded; the French sustained losses of 27 killed and 44 wounded.

By intercepting the ship carrying the despatches for Allemand, Baker had unwittingly played a role in bringing about the battle of Trafalgar, but he was to play an even greater role a few days later, possibly even staving off an invasion of England. In 1847 the Admiralty awarded the Naval General service Medal with clasp "Phoenix 10 Augt. 1805" to all surviving claimants from the action.

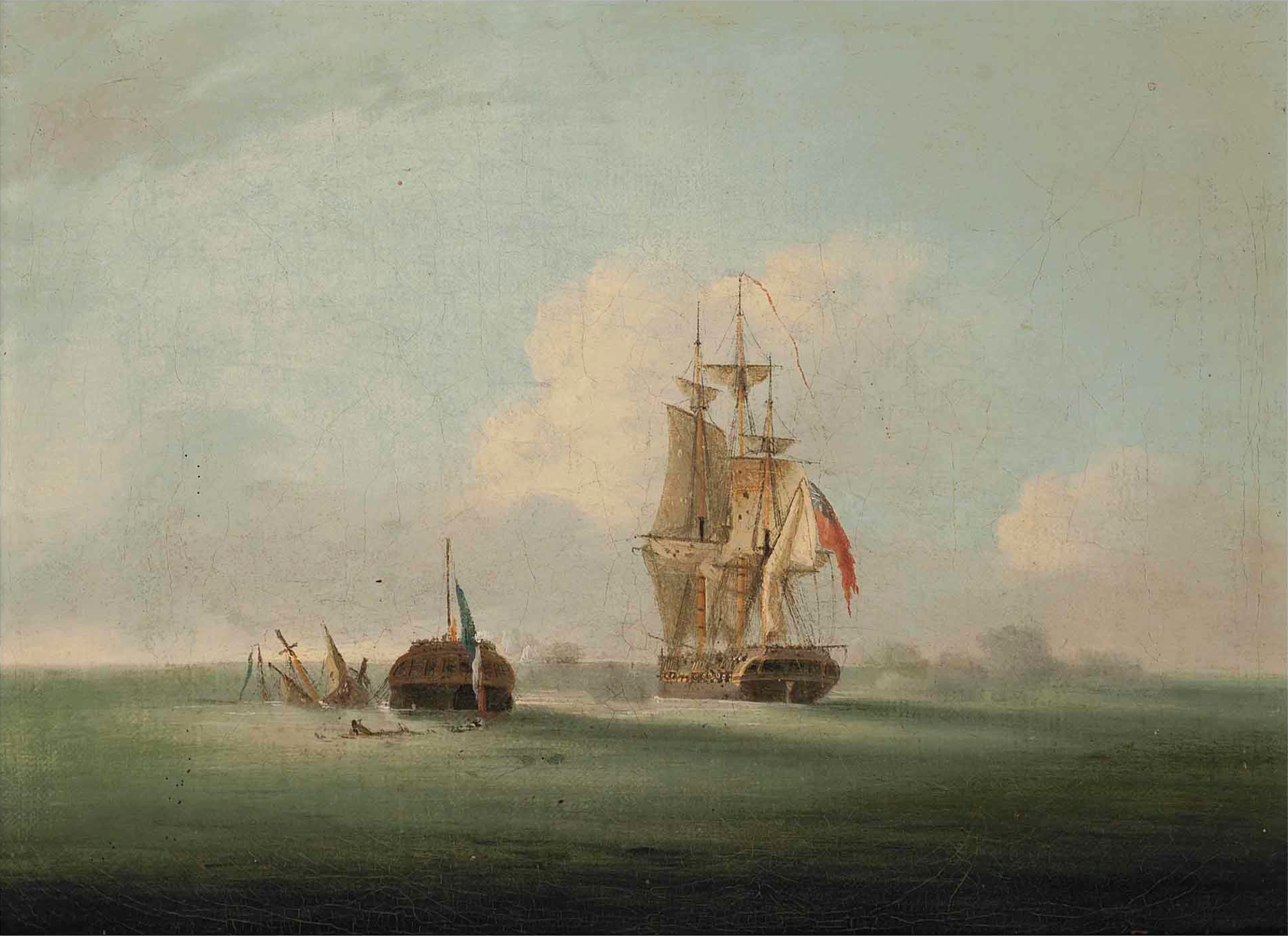
The battle-scarred HMS Phoenix and Didon shortly after their engagement on 10 August 1805, depicted by Sartorius

While sailing to Gibraltar with his prize in tow, Baker fell in with the 74-gun HMS Dragon on 14 August. The following day the combined fleet under Villeneuve, heading for Brest and then on to Boulogne to escort the French invasion forces across the Channel sighted the three British ships. Villeneuve mistook the British ships for scouts from the Channel Fleet and fled south to avoid an action. A furious Napoleon raged 'What a Navy! What an admiral! All those sacrifices for nought!' Villeneuve's failure to press north was a decisive point of the Trafalgar campaign as far as the invasion of England went, for abandoning all hope of fulfilling his plans to secure control of the Channel Napoleon gathered the Armée d'Angleterre, now renamed the Grande Armée, and headed east to attack the Austrians in the Ulm campaign. The British ships altered their course and made for Plymouth, where they arrived on 3 September, having prevented an attempt by their French prisoners to capture Phoenix and retake Didon.

=== Channel ===
Although Phoenix had missed the battle of Trafalgar, she saw action in November 1805. Baker was under orders to patrol west of the Isles of Scilly when meeting some merchantmen he received intelligence that they had seen a small squadron of presumably French ships of the line in the Bay of Biscay. The British were looking for the celebrated Rochefort squadron of five sail of the line, three frigates, and two brigs, under Rear-admiral Zacharie Allemand, which was loose somewhere in the Atlantic (the Allemand's expedition of 1805). Baker decide to investigate.

On 2 November 1805, Phoenix discovered four ships, which Baker presumed to be part of the Rochefort squadron, but were actually vessels under Rear Admiral Dumanoir, consisting of four French ships of the line that had escaped Trafalgar. Phoenix sailed in search of Sir Richard Strachan's squadron to report the find, who, as it happened, was fairly close by. During the ensuing Battle of Cape Ortegal, Phoenix and the other British frigates harassed the French rear. While doing so, she helped to capture the French ship Scipion, which was then commissioned into the Royal Navy. During the action Phoenix lost two men killed and four wounded. Serving aboard Phoenix at this time, as first lieutenant was Samuel Brown, later to become a distinguished engineer and reach the rank of captain.

In December 1805, Captain Zachary Mudge took command of Phoenix.

In the first week of January 1807, Phoenix and the hired armed brig Colpoys sent into Plymouth Cupedo, which had been sailing from Montevideo to St Sebastian.

On 17 January 1808 off Rochefort, Phoenix observed a French squadron, under Admiral Ganteaume putting to sea. Phoenix despatched the 18-gun brig-sloop Raleigh to England with the information and sailed in search of the watching squadron under Strachan, which bad weather had driven out to sea. Not finding Strachan, Phoenix too sailed for England, having informed the gun-brig Attack of the news. Attack found Strachan on 23 January, but bad weather and other difficulties delayed Strachan and he was unable to intercept the French before they reached Toulon.

In March 1809 Phoenix received some 32-pounder carronades.

On 28 January 1810 Phoenix, with the ship-sloop Jalouse, chased the 14-gun French privateer brig Charles, but lost her in thick fog. The next day Phoenix discovered Charles anchored close under the French coast. A cutting out expedition then went in with boats. Charles had a crew of 70 men, who resisted, killing one seaman on Phoenix and wounding another. Still, the boats succeeded in taking Charles, where they found two English masters and 13 seamen who had been taken out of vessels a few days previously. One of the vessels Charles had captured was David, Wilkinson, master, which had been sailing from Newfoundland to Waterford. Her captors sent Charles into Plymouth. (Note: Charles was a 14-gun privateer from Bordeaux. From December 1808, she was under the command of Captain Plassiard, who commanded a crew of 90 men. She was a joint-venture between Plassiard, the merchant Balguerie, and the Protestant merchants Baour frères. She made a voyage to Senegal and on her return in 1809 the partners fitted her out as a privateer.)

== Later career ==
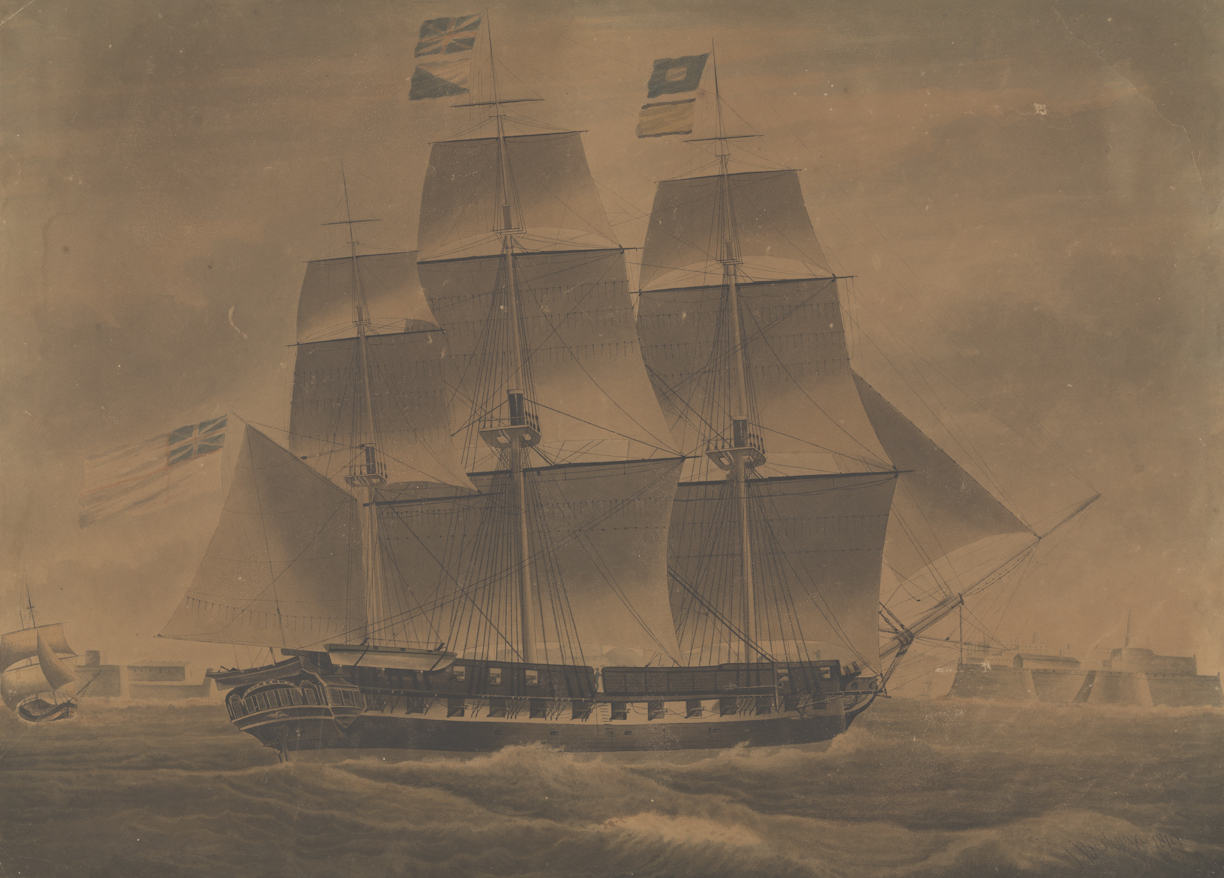
Phoenix beating into Marsamashet Harbor, Malta, by J. Bushman

In 1810 Captain James Bowen assumed command of Phoenix and sailed her for the East Indies on 11 May 1810. On 4 July she and the convoy of East Indiamen she was escorting were "all well" at 8°52′S 26°30′W. In October 1812, she took part in a punitive expedition against the Sultanate of Sambas in West Borneo with sloops-of-war Procris and Barracouta, but the expedition failed due to a lack of troop complement with which to launch an amphibious assault on the defended town of Sambas. Phoenix returned to base in Batavia, and Bowen died shortly after.

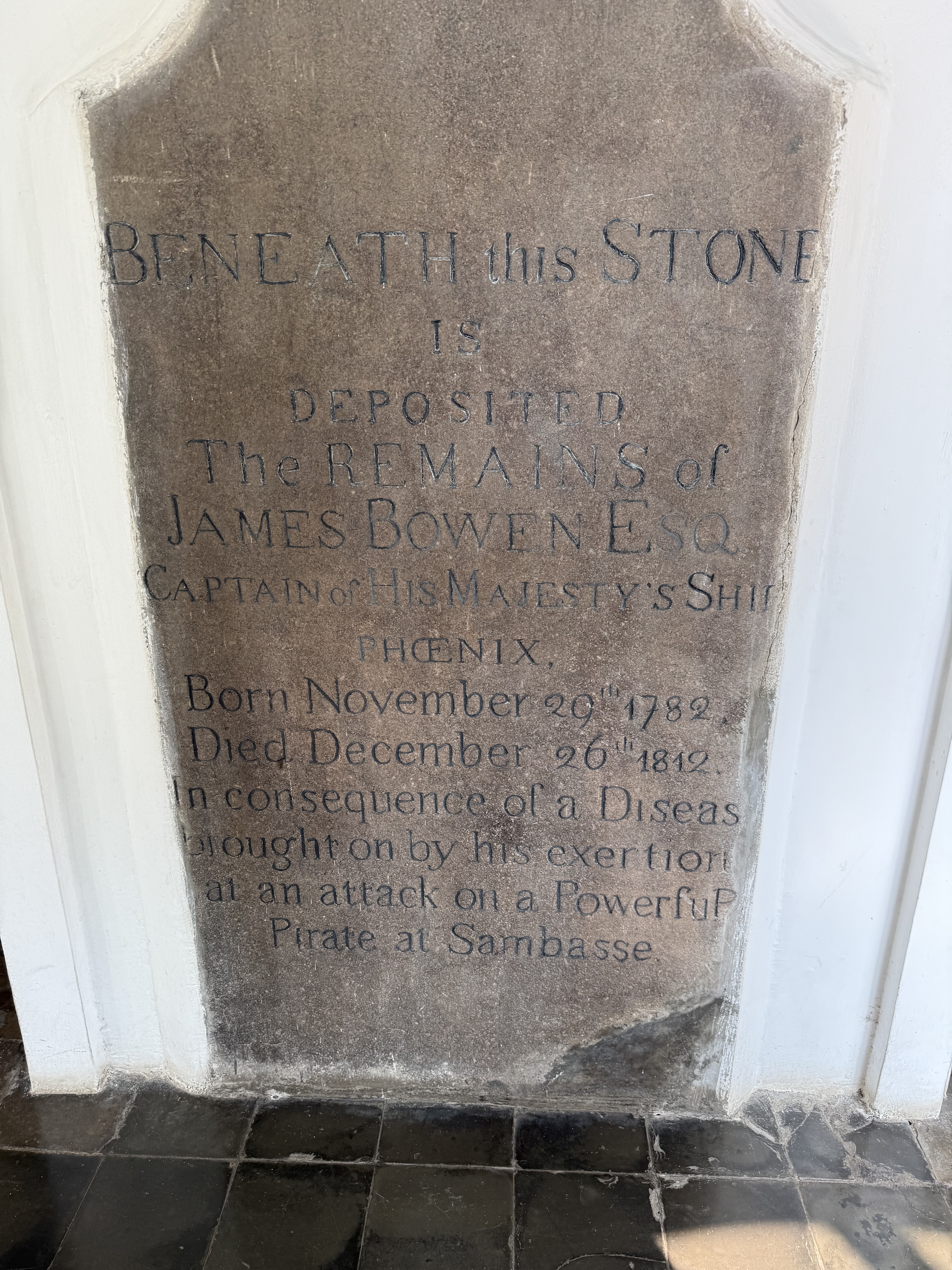
The grave stone of James Bowen located in the wall of All Saints Anglican Church in Jakarta, Indonesia

Captain William Webley assumed command of Phoenix in 1813 and held the post until September 1814. From 14 September 1814 on, her last captain was Charles Austen, brother of the novelist Jane Austen. In 1815, following Napoleon's escape from Elba, the Admiralty sent Phoenix, Undaunted, and Garland to the Adriatic to co-operate with the Austrians and to prevent the escape of some Neapolitan warships. Phoenix and Garland watched two large frigates at Brindisi, while Undaunted searched the coast to the northward. After the surrender of Naples, following the Treaty of Casalanza, Austen persuaded the captains of the two Neapolitan frigates to switch their allegiance to the restored monarch, Ferdinand IV of Naples.

Phoenix, Aquilon, Garland, and Renard next proceeded to the Greek Archipelago in search of a French squadron comprising the frigate Junon, the 32-gun corvette Victorieuse, two brigs and two large schooners, which had been preying on trade in the area. Unfortunately Austen discovered that the enemy was no longer in the islands; shortly afterwards peace was restored.

== Fate ==
Phoenix was lost in a storm off Smyrna (İzmir) on 20 February 1816, due to the ignorance of her pilots when a sudden change of wind threw her on the shore. Fortunately, all aboard her survived; the vessel was so close to the shore that her fallen top-gallant mast reached from the wreck to the shore. Also, Renard helped save her crew.

Austen was able to procure a storehouse for the crew where they were provided with fires, bread and wine. Mr. Curotavich of Chisme took in Austen and his officers, supplying them with clothes, food, and beds. While the crew was in Smyrna, Austen had to have several members flogged for drunkenness and thieving.

On 2 March the British burnt Phoenix to the water's edge to get her copper bolts. They then sold the remains to Mr. Curotavich that same day for £600. The transport Zodiac took the crew to Malta. The subsequent court martial absolved Austen of blame.

== Miscellany ==
The earliest example of the use of HMS as an abbreviation is a reference to HMS Phoenix in 1789.
