= Ross Donnelly =

Royal Navy Admiral (1764–1840)

Admiral Sir Ross Donnelly KCB
- Born: 1764
- Died: 30 September 1840 (aged 76); Marylebone, London, England
- Military career
- Allegiance: United Kingdom
- Branch: Royal Navy
- Service years: 1780–1814
- Rank: Admiral
- Conflicts: American Revolutionary War; Siege of Charleston; French Revolutionary Wars; Glorious First of June; Action of 12 May 1796; Napoleonic Wars

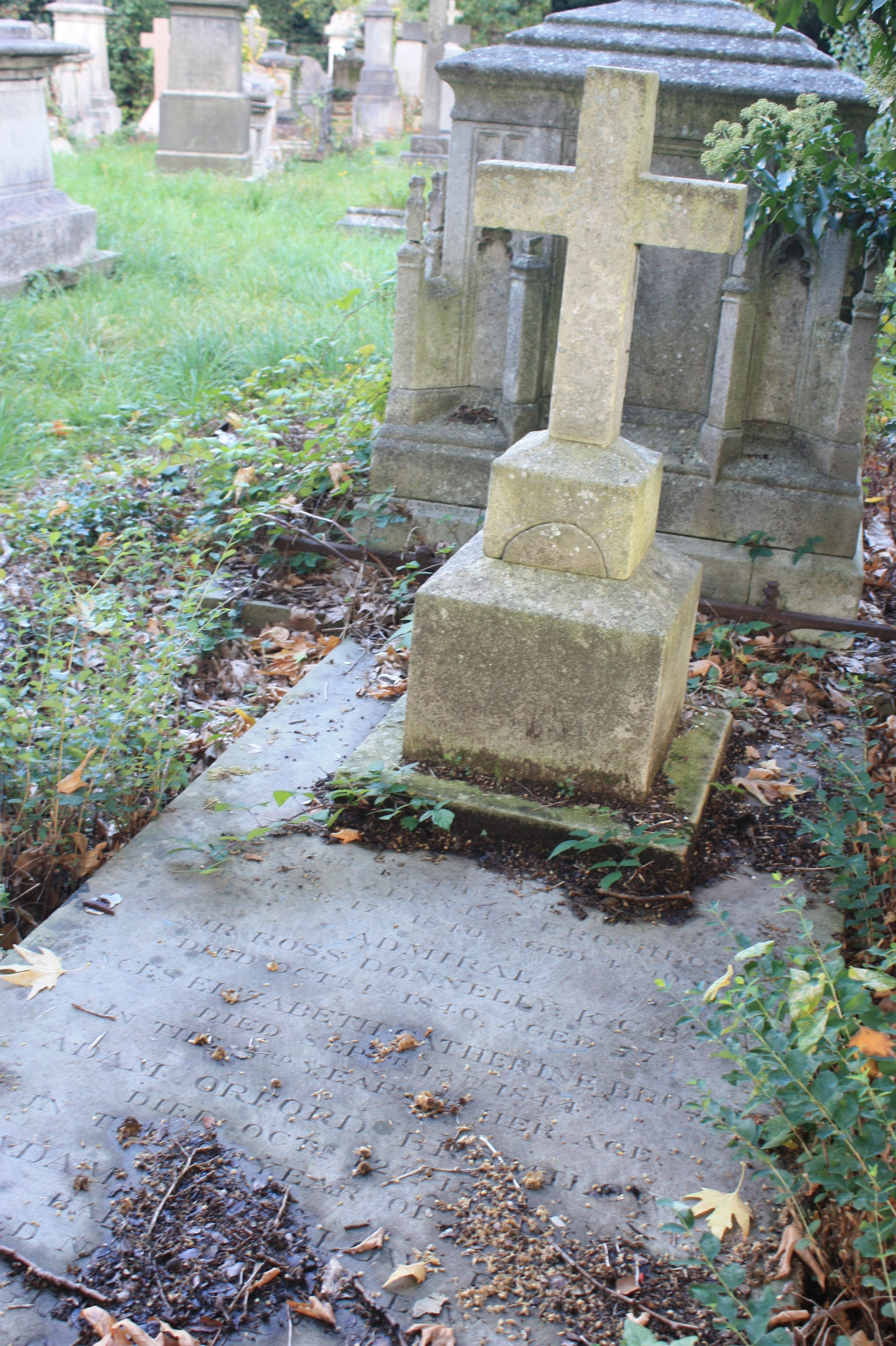
The grave of Admiral Ross Donnelly, Kensal Green Cemetery

Admiral Sir Ross Donnelly, KCB (1764 – 30 September 1840) was an Irish Royal Navy officer who is known for his service during the American War of Independence, French Revolutionary War and Napoleonic Wars. He was first lieutenant on HMS Montagu at the Glorious First of June and assumed command after the death of Captain James Montagu.

Promoted to post captain in June 1795, Donnelly was given HMS Pegasus in which he participated in the action of 12 May 1796.

== Early life ==
Ross Donnelly was born in 1764, son of Francis Donnelly of Athlone, County Roscommon.

== Career ==
He joined the Royal Navy in the 1770s and served off the Eastern Seaboard of North America during the American War of Independence, seeing action at the Siege of Charleston. He was subsequently transferred to Newfoundland and, as a lieutenant, given command of the sloop HMS Morning Star for the remainder of the war. During the peace of 1783 to 1793, Donnelly joined the fleet of the Honourable East India Company, serving as a mate before rejoining the Navy at the outbreak of the French Revolutionary Wars.

Donnelly was assigned to the 74 gun ship of the line HMS Montagu under Captain James Montagu and served in the Channel Fleet, joining the fleet under Lord Howe that participated in the Atlantic campaign of May 1794 and fought at the Glorious First of June. Montagu was heavily engaged with the French ship Neptune and Captain Montagu was killed in the early stages, command devolving on Donnelly. Donnelly commanded the ship with skill and was commended, but due to his rank was denied the rewards that went to the victorious captains. In June 1795, Donnelly was promoted to post captain and took command of the frigate HMS Pegasus, serving with the North Sea Fleet and participating in the action of 12 May 1796 off the Dutch coast.

Donnelly later took command of HMS Maidstone and in 1801 escorted a convoy from Porto to Britain before taking command of the frigate HMS Narcissus and charged with returning the ambassador to Algeria before carrying out astronomical observations in the Aegean Sea. From there he joined the Mediterranean Fleet where Admiral Lord Nelson would later hold him in high esteem, commending him in letters and placing several of his proteges under Donnelly's command.

In 1805, he accompanied the expeditionary force which invaded the Cape of Good Hope and the Rio de la Plata, where he was commended and rewarded on his return to Britain with command of the ship of the line HMS Ardent which he brought back to South America and continued serving in the campaign until its conclusion in 1807. In 1808, he took command of HMS Invincible, but was forced into early retirement in 1810 due to cataracts. His eyesight slowly recovered over the next two years, and at the end of the war he was on the verge of commissioning the new ship of the line HMS Devonshire.

== Retirement and health ==
Postwar, Donnelly retired, although he remained in service and received steady promotions, becoming a full admiral in 1838. A year earlier he had been rewarded for his long service with a knighthood, becoming a Knight Commander of the Order of the Bath.

In November 1839, Donnelly suffered from heart trouble, followed by rapid decline in his mental health that within months became advanced dementia. By July 1840, a lunacy commission was held to inquire into the admiral's state of mind, which heard from witnesses who testified that Donnelly was forgetful, confused, and prone to fits of abuse directed at his staff, several of whom he dismissed only to mistake them for new servants when they returned. His doctor testified that of historical matters, including his naval exploits, Donnelly spoke with great accuracy. When asked the month, Donnelly himself correctly stated it was July, but when pressed to state whether July was in winter or summer, he retorted that the season depended on whether one was in the southern or northern hemisphere, causing much laughter. Donnelly became confused when asked about the number of children he had who were still living. He chastised some of his daughters, but praised his son, a solicitor in Sydney, whom he wanted to manage his estate. The commission declared him of unsound mind since 15 November 1839.

He died on 30 September 1840 at his home at 30, Harley Street, London. He is buried in the overgrown north-west quadrant of the inner circle at Kensal Green Cemetery in London.

== Family ==
He was married and had eight children, six of whom survived to adulthood. His eldest daughter, Anne Jane (died 1855), married, on 18 April 1816, George Thicknesse-Touchet, 20th Baron Audley, and had issue.
