= John Halsted =

Captain John Halsted
- Born: 1768; Gosport, Hampshire
- Died: 2 November 1830, age 62; Exeter, Devon
- Relatives: Lawrence Halsted (brother)
- Military career
- Allegiance: Great Britain United Kingdom
- Branch: Royal Navy
- Service years: 1776 – 1830
- Rank: Captain
- Commands: HMS Swift; HMS Vulcan; HMS Lord Nelson; HMS Bellerophon; HMS Scarborough
- Conflicts: American Revolutionary War; Relief of Gibraltar; Battle of Cape Spartel; French Revolutionary Wars; Napoleonic Wars

Captain John Halsted (1768 – 2 November 1830) was a Royal Navy officer who served in the American War of Independence and French Revolutionary and Napoleonic Wars.

Born into a naval family, Halsted went to sea at an early age with his father and at least one of his brothers. After a period of schooling he rejoined the navy and served aboard a number of ships and under a variety of notable commanders of the age, until reaching the rank of lieutenant shortly after the outbreak of the French Revolutionary Wars. He went out to the East Indies for much of them, serving onshore with troops and later commanding a sloop, before returning to Britain hoping to receive post-rank and the command of a frigate. He was disappointed, the Admiralty declined to confirm his appointment and he spent a number of years without a ship.

He returned to active service only in 1804, with the command of a defence and storeship, followed by a position as agent for transports for the expedition to Copenhagen in 1807. He again escaped official notice, and it was not until 1808 that he received a promotion to post-captain. He took command of the 74-gun HMS Bellerophon in 1810, followed by the 74-gun HMS Scarborough in 1813, commanding them in the North Sea. His final service during the wars was to oversee the impress service at Gosport, a post that allowed him to meet Prince Regent. He seems to have had no further service after the wars ended in 1815, and eventually died, still a post-captain, in 1830.

== Family and early life ==
Relief of Gibraltar by Earl Howe, 11 October 1782, depicted by Richard Paton. Halsted served aboard the 98-gun HMS Blenheim during both the relief and the subsequent Battle of Cape Spartel.

Halsted was born in Gosport, Hampshire in 1768, the third son of naval officer Captain William Anthony Halsted, and his wife Mary, née Frankland. Three of John's brothers had naval careers; Charles Halsted became a lieutenant and was lost with HMS Blanche in 1780, Lawrence Halsted had a long career and became an admiral, and George Halsted rose to be a commander. John Halsted also embarked on a naval career in 1776, joining his brother Lawrence aboard their father's ship, the 60-gun HMS Jersey, for service off North America. John was eight years old at the time. William Anthony Halsted died while in command off New York City in 1778, and John was transferred to the 32-gun HMS Amazon, where he remained into 1779. He was then entered into a school for the next three years, rejoining the navy in 1782 as a midshipman aboard the 98-gun HMS Blenheim. The Blenheim, commanded at this time by Captain Adam Duncan, went out to relieve Gibraltar with Admiral Lord Howe's fleet. Howe's fleet was then engaged with a Spanish force under Luis de Córdova at the Battle of Cape Spartel on 20 October 1782, in which Blenheim had two men killed and three wounded. Halsted then transferred to the 98-gun HMS Princess Royal under Captain Jonathan Faulknor.

Halsted now went on to serve aboard a succession of different ships; the 90-gun HMS Queen, the Portsmouth guardship and flagship of the Commander-in-Chief, Admiral John Montagu, and then the 74-gun HMS Ganges, commanded successively by the Hon. James Luttrell and Sir Roger Curtis. His next ship was a frigate, the 32-gun HMS Hebe under Captain Edward Thornbrough, followed by the 36-gun HMS Perseverance, under Captain Isaac Smith. Halsted went out to the East Indies during Perseverance's posting to that station. He then served aboard the 64-gun HMS Crown, under Captain Robert Manners Sutton, and the 74-gun HMS Brunswick under Sir Roger Curtis. He then moved aboard the 100-gun HMS Queen Charlotte, the flagship of Admiral Lord Howe. Howe promoted him to lieutenant and in September 1793 arranged for him to be appointed to the 74-gun HMS Suffolk.

== French Revolutionary Wars ==
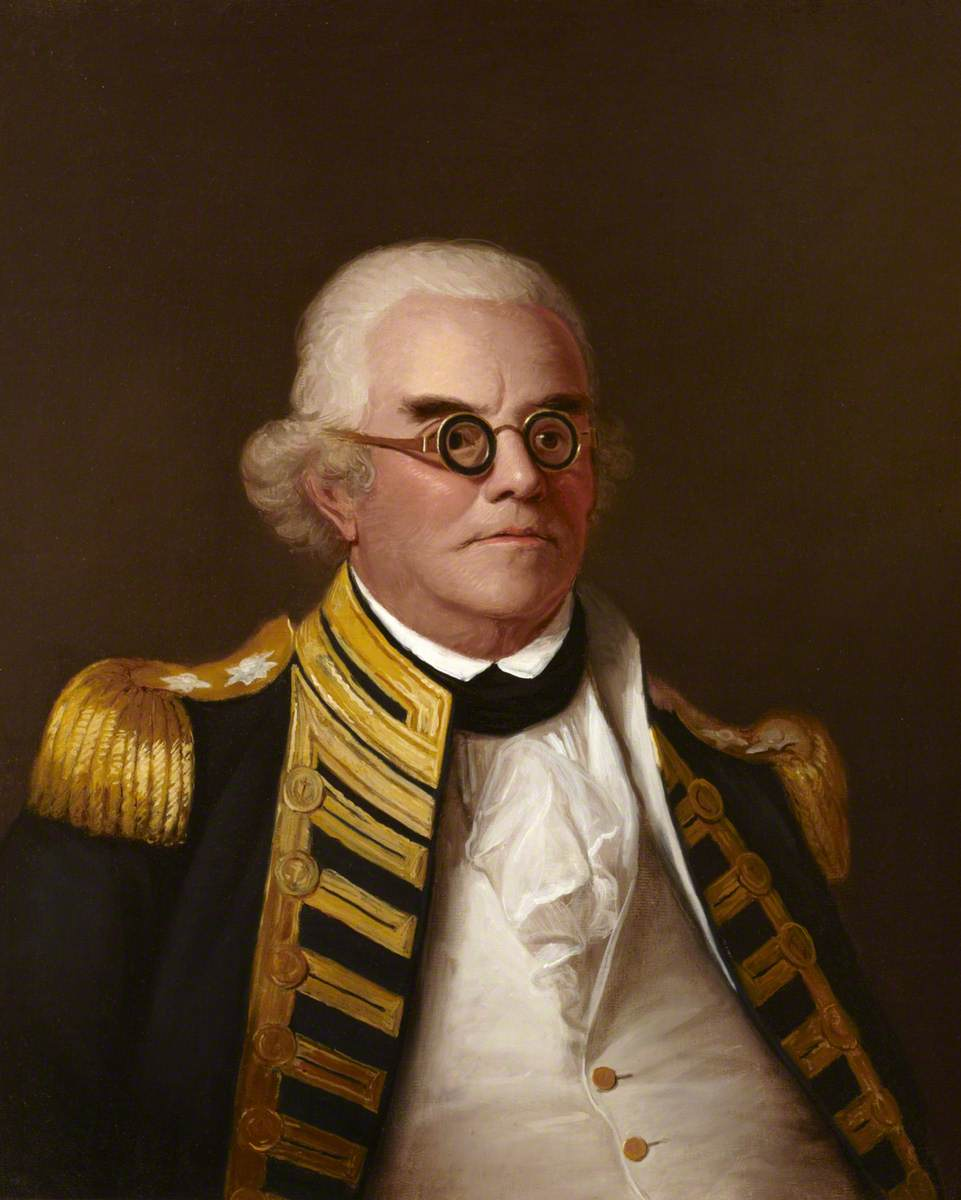
Commodore Peter Rainier, Halsted's commander, and patron, on the East Indies Station.

The French Revolutionary Wars having broken out by now, Suffolk was ordered to the East Indies under Captain Peter Rainier, where Rainier was to take command of the East Indies Station. Halsted was active in operations against French colonies in the East Indies, and Rainier placed him in charge of 100 sailors during shore operations at Ceylon and the Maluku Islands. He returned with the troops to Madras in March 1797 and was appointed to his first command, the sloop HMS Swift. Halsted was only briefly in command in an acting capacity, and at Rainier's request he left the ship to take charge of the newly established naval hospital at Madras, having impressed Rainier with his measures while in charge of the sick returning from the expedition to Amboyna.^{[a]} He was then ordered to join the expedition against Manila, travelling to Calcutta to take command of the bomb vessel HMS Vulcan in July. The expedition was cancelled before it left India, and November 1797 Halsted received a new commission, to take over the 32-gun HMS Heroine from Captain John Murray, Murray having been ordered by the Admiralty to take command of the 36-gun HMS Crescent. Crescent was based at the Cape of Good Hope Station, but Murray had affairs to settle in India. Rainier therefore asked Halsted to exchange with Murray and instead sail to take over Crescent on the Cape Station, and at the same time carry despatches to be forwarded back to Britain from there.

On arriving at the Cape, Halsted found his ship had sailed. Rear-Admiral Thomas Pringle, the station's commander-in-chief, had sailed for England sometime before, taking passage on Crescent as his flagship. Halsted followed on, delivering his despatches, but to his "mortification", he found that the Admiralty would not confirm his post-rank, but only offered him the rank of commander, dated from June 1798, the time of his arrival in Britain.

== Napoleonic Wars ==
Halsted then seems to have spent several years without a ship. He was finally given command of HMS Lord Nelson, a defence and storeship anchored in the Downs, in 1804, followed by the position of principal agent for transports for the expedition to Copenhagen in 1807. His service in the latter role was also marked with personal disappointment, as his contribution was overlooked and not reported back to the Admiralty by the expedition's captain of the fleet, Home Riggs Popham. Popham was later censured for this by the Transport Board, and the expedition's commander, Lord Gambier. Halsted's role then took him to Gibraltar, where he was active until the signing of the Convention of Cintra, after which he finally received a promotion to post-captain, on 21 November 1808.

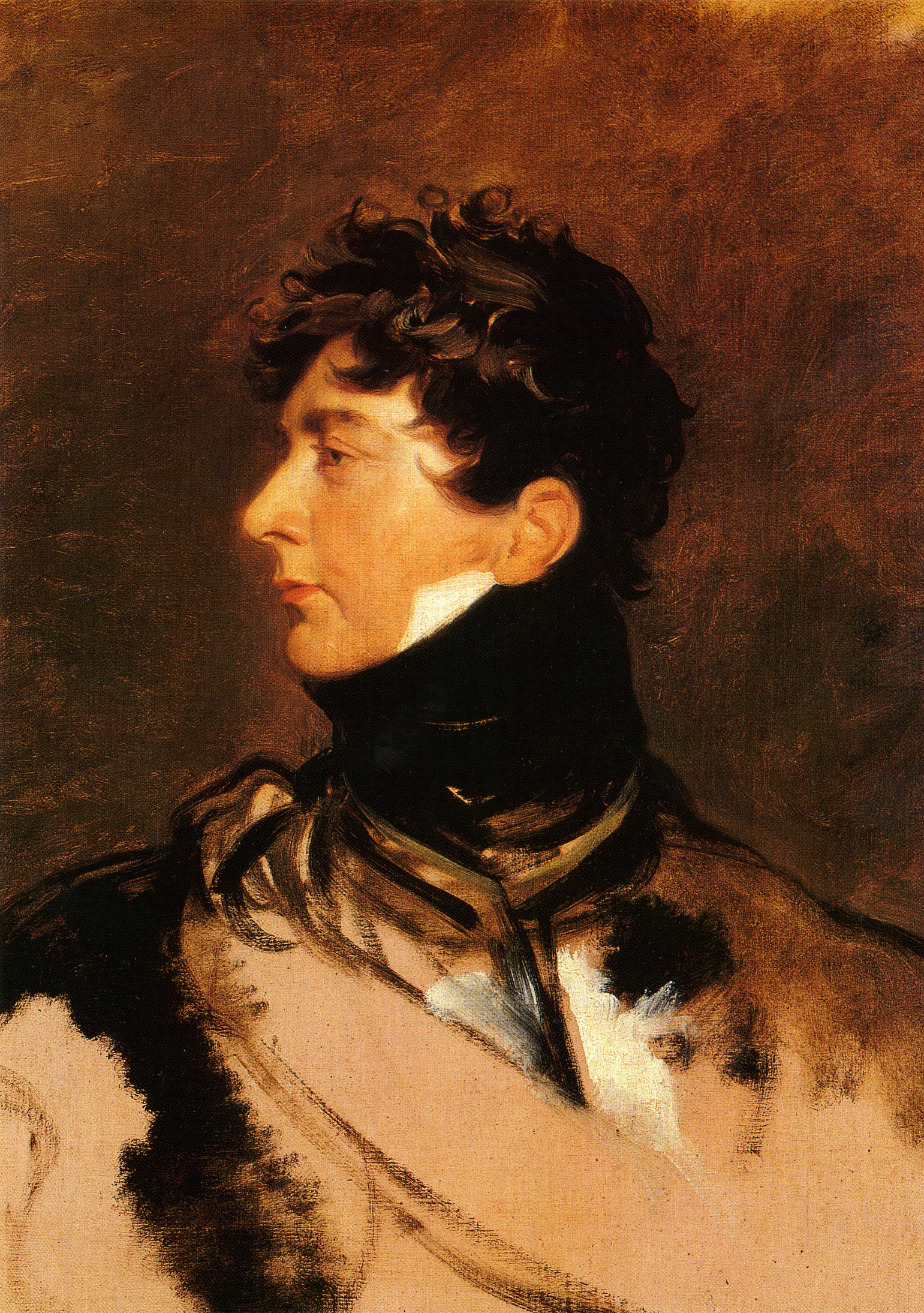
The Prince Regent, painted by Sir Thomas Lawrence in 1814, about the time that Halsted first met him.

He stepped down from his post with the Transport Board in 1809, and on 23 August 1810 succeeded Captain Samuel Warren as commander of the 74-gun HMS Bellerophon. During this time Bellerophon was employed with the North Sea squadron, blockading the Dutch ports. Halsted's time in command was relatively brief, he was superseded by Captain Augustus Brine on 5 November 1810. He next commissioned the newly built 74-gun HMS Scarborough in February 1813, continuing in the North Sea and serving as flag captain to Rear-Admiral John Ferrier. He left Scarborough in early 1814 and took charge of the impress service at Gosport, holding the position until the end of the Napoleonic Wars in 1815. During his time in the role, he met the Prince Regent during his visit to Portsmouth Dockyard, and was allowed to kiss his hand. Halsted was later sent with a delegation from the town to read an address to the former Prince Regent, who had since succeeded as King George IV. Halsted was again allowed to kiss the monarch's hand.

== Family and later life ==
Halsted appears to have had no active seagoing service after the end of the wars with France. He married Miss A. Fowler and had two sons and one daughter. Of his sons, his eldest, Lawrence William, obtained a commission in the 87th Regiment of Foot, while George Anthony followed his father into the navy, having reached the rank of lieutenant by 1830. Due to his low position on the seniority lists, John Halsted did not live long enough to achieve flag rank. He died, still a post-captain, at Exeter on 2 November 1830, at the age of 62.

== Notes ==
a. Halsted's brief tenure was fortunate for him. His successor aboard Swift, Commander Thomas Hayward, took the sloop to sea in July 1797 and was never seen again. She was presumed to have foundered with all hands in a typhoon in the South China Sea.
