= Action of 12 May 1796 =

1796 battle of the War of the First Coalition

- Part of the War of the First Coalition
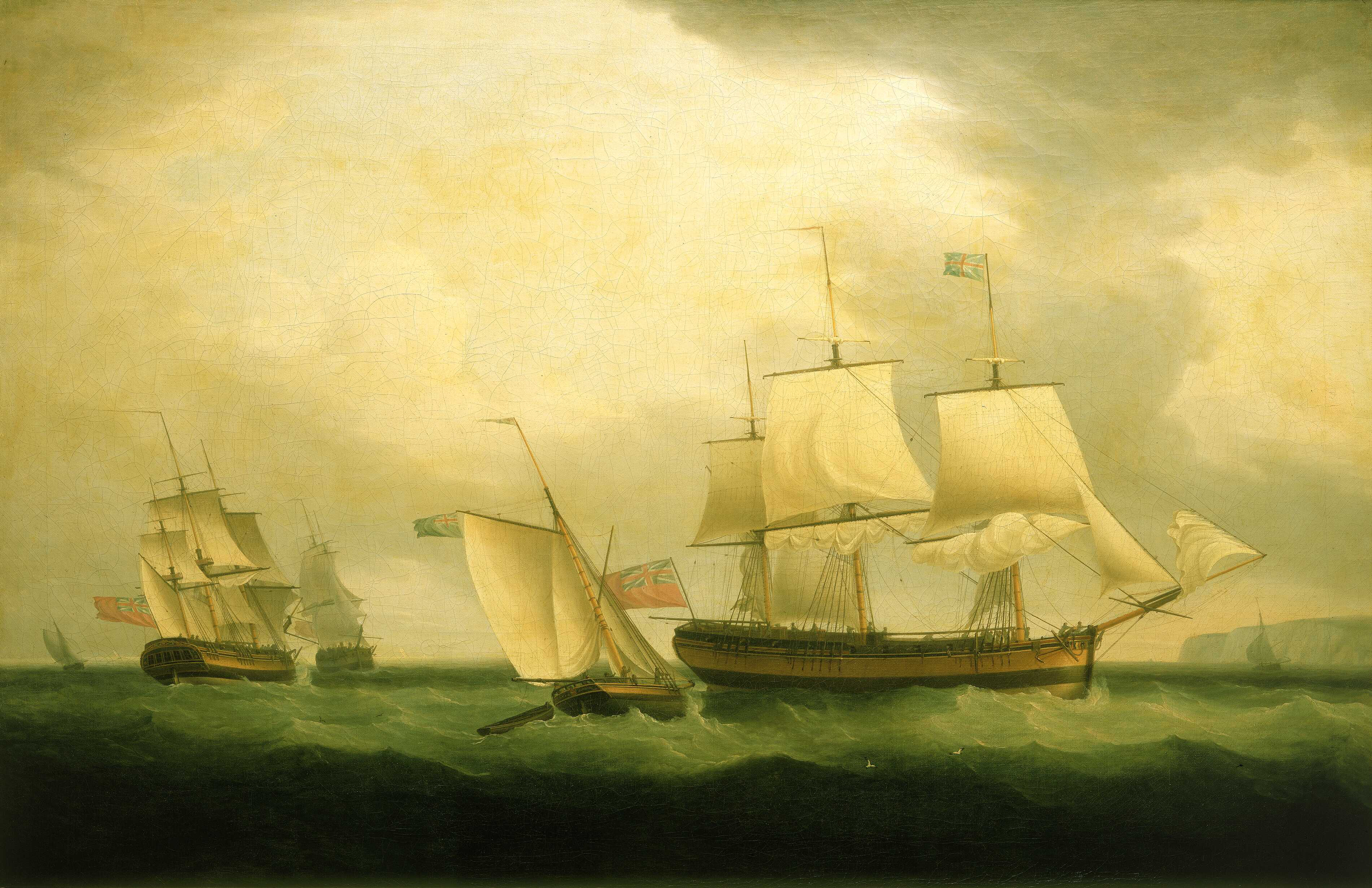
- HMS Sylph (first from right) in 1795
Date	12 May 1796
Location	Off Texel, North Sea
Result	British victory

Belligerents
Great Britain	Batavian Republic

Commanders and leaders
Lawrence Halstead	Unknown

Strength
3 frigates 1 brig-sloop	1 frigate 3 brigs 1 cutter

Casualties and losses
1 killed 3 wounded	6 killed 28 wounded 1 frigate captured 1 brig captured 2 brigs wrecked 1 cutter captured

The action of 12 May 1796 was a minor naval engagement during the War of the First Coalition between a Royal Navy squadron and five smaller ships of the Batavian Navy. The British squadron had been detached on the previous day from the British North Sea fleet under Admiral Adam Duncan, which was cruising off the Batavian fleet anchorage at the Texel, while the Batavian squadron was returning to the Netherlands from the Norwegian coast where it had been sheltering since suffering defeat at the action of 22 August 1795 the previous year. As the Batavian squadron neared the Dutch coast, the British squadron under Captain Lawrence Halstead attacked.

In his frigate HMS Phoenix, Halstead was able to cut the Batavian frigate Argo off from the shore and bring it to battle, forcing it to surrender in just 20 minutes as other British ships closed with the combat. The remainder of the Batavian squadron had dispersed eastwards away from the frigates and Duncan's fleet, pursued by the frigate HMS Pegasus and brig-sloop HMS Sylph. After a lengthy chase, Phoenix caught the cutter Duke of York, Sylph seized the brig Mercuur, while Pegasus succeeded in driving the other brigs, Echo and Gier ashore, where both were believed wrecked. Duncan's blockade of the Texel was instrumental in British control of the North Sea, and a year later it would achieve a decisive victory at the Battle of Camperdown.

== Background ==
In February 1793, the French Republic declared war on the Kingdom of Great Britain and the Dutch Republic, drawing both into the ongoing French Revolutionary Wars. Less than two years later, in the winter of 1794–1795, the Dutch Republic was overrun by the French Army, French cavalry charging the Dutch Navy across the ice that blocked its winter anchorages, capturing it intact. The French reorganised the country into a client state named the Batavian Republic, and ordered the Dutch Navy to operate in the North Sea against British maritime trade routes. The British government did not immediately declare war on the Batavian Republic, but did take steps to seize Dutch shipping in British ports and established a new fleet to combat Batavian operations in the North Sea. The North Sea Fleet, as it was known, was composed mainly of older and smaller vessels not considered suitable for service in the Channel Fleet, and command of this force was given to the 66–year old Admiral Adam Duncan.

In August 1795, the Batavian Navy sent a frigate squadron to operate against the British trade routes with Scandinavia, which carried large quantities of British naval stores to supply the British fleets. These trade routes passed from the Baltic Sea through the Kattegat and Skagerrak channels and across the North Sea, and the Batavian squadron consequently cruised at the mouth of the Kattegat off the southern coast of neutral Danish controlled Norway. To counteract this Batavian operation, Duncan sent a squadron of British frigates from the North Sea Fleet under the command of Captain James Alms with orders to intercept and destroy the Batavian ships. On 22 August, Alms's force discovered the Batavian squadron close to the Norwegian harbour of Eigerøya. Alms closed with the Batavian force in an attempt to cut it off from land, but was only able to intercept the Batavian frigate Alliante with his ship HMS Stag, compelling the Batavian vessel to surrender in a short engagement. Although the remainder of his squadron exchanged fire with the Batavian ships, damaging the frigate Argo, Alms' force was unable to prevent their escape into Eigerøya.

For the rest of the year, Argo operated from the Norwegian coast, unable to make any significant cruises due to the attention of British warships operating in the region. By May 1796, Duncan's fleet was now actively cruising against the Batavian Navy, commanding a blockade force of nine ships of the line and numerous smaller vessels at sea off the Texel, the principal Batavian fleet anchorage. Duncan also ensured that the blockade of the Batavian vessels in Norwegian ports was maintained, with the 28–gun frigate HMS Pegasus under Captain Ross Donnelly and the brig-sloop HMS Sylph under Commander John Chambers White sent to patrol the waters off Lindesnes. In early May, the Batavian authorities ordered Argo to return to the fleet at the Texel, and the frigate sailed from the Norwegian port of Flekkerøy on 11 May with three Batavian brigs: Echo of 18–guns, Mercuur of 16–guns and Gier of 14–guns.

The departure of the Batavian squadron was noticed by Donnelly's small blockade force, which shadowed the Batavian ships as they passed southwards down the coast of Jutland, losing sight of them at 22:00 on 11 May. Donnelly correctly guessed the Batavian force's destination, and ordered Sylph to separate, the two vessels following different courses, instructing White to proceed to Duncan's blockade fleet and meet Donnelly there if he was unable to rediscover the Batavian squadron en route. Pegasus and Sylph encountered one another shortly before 05:00 on 12 May close to Duncan's fleet south of the Texel but without having located the Batavian squadron. Argo and her consorts had sailed close to the Danish and German coasts during the night, seizing in passing a British cutter named Duke of York, travelling from Yarmouth to Hamburg. At dawn on 12 May the Batavian ships were off the Batavian coast sailing southwest towards the Texel anchorage.

== Battle ==
On hearing Donnelly's report, Duncan immediately despatched a small squadron to the mouth of the Texel to wait for the arrival of the Batavian squadron. Command of this squadron was given to Captain Lawrence Halstead in the 36–gun frigate HMS Phoenix, accompanied by Pegasus, Sylph and the 50–gun fourth rate HMS Leopard. The squadron detached at 05:00 and almost immediately the Batavian squadron was sighted to the southeast, heading for the entrance to the Texel, tacking against the northwest wind. Halstead's force was not unified, with Pegasus and Sylph far ahead of Phoenix and Leopard, and the British commander decided to deliberately detach his forces, the faster Pegasus and Sylph pursuing the brigs under Donnelly's command and Halstead's rear force attacking the frigate Argo. Duncan's main fleet, some distance behind Halstead, also sighted the Batavian squadron and joined the chase.

The Batavian captain, finding such a large force bearing down on him, ordered the brigs and cutter to separate from the frigate, turning with the wind in an effort to escape with Donnelly close behind. He also turned Argo away from the pursuing Phoenix, but was unable to decide whether to fight or flee and as a result changed course a number of times. This inevitably slowed his ship, and at 08:15 Phoenix was able to come alongside, with the advantage of the weather gage. Halstead fired a shot across the Batavian ship's bow as a warning to surrender to such overwhelming odds, but the Batavian captain refused and opened fire on the British frigate. Although Argo made strenuous efforts to escape during the exchange of fire, Halstead's ship was both more accurate and effective, mounting 36 18-pounder cannon and 8 32-pounder carronades to the Batavian frigate's 12-pounder main battery supplemented with a number of cannon of lower calibres. In just 20 minutes, Phoenix had torn much of Argo's rigging, sails and masts and inflicted heavy casualties of eight killed and 28 wounded. With his ship damaged, Duncan's fleet in sight and Leopard not far behind Phoenix, the Batavian captain surrendered at 08:35, allowing Halstead to take possession of his vessel.

Phoenix was joined soon after the surrender of Argo by the 74–gun ship of the line HMS Powerful under Captain William O'Bryen Drury and together the ships took possession of the frigate while the chase of the remainder of the Batavian squadron continued. At 10:00 two of the brigs turned towards the Batavian coastline to seek shelter and two of the leading British ships, Pegasus and the 50–gun HMS Leander under Captain Maurice Delgarno, turned in chase. Donnelly sought to interpose his ships between the brigs and the coast, but found that this would have slowed his vessels so much that the Batavian brigs would have an opportunity to escape. He therefore maintained pursuit and watched the Batavian ships, Gier and Echo driven ashore at the Batavian village of Bosch. Sailing as close to the shore line as safely possible, Delgarno detached cutters to investigate the state of the grounded ships, determining that one had been damaged beyond repair while the other, having initially grounded, had been driven over the shoal into deeper water on the far side. In his report on the action, Duncan considered that a storm which swept the area on the day following the action probably drove the brig back onto the shoal and destroyed it.

The last survivors of the Batavian squadron were harried along the coast by the faster forces in the British fleet with Sylph overhauling the 16-gun Mercuur, forcing it to surrender just before 11:00. The Batavian captain had thrown 14 cannon overboard in an effort to lighten his ship and allow it to escape British pursuit, but without success. Later in the day, Halstead's Phoenix was able to seize the Batavian prize Duke of York, completing the destruction of the entire Batavian squadron.

== Aftermath ==
Halstead brought his prizes back to Britain, where both Argo and Mercuur were purchased for service by the Royal Navy as HMS Janus and HMS Hermes respectively as both of the Batavian names were already in use by the Royal Navy. British losses in the engagement were one man killed and three wounded, all suffered on Phoenix during the engagement with Argo. Apart from the losses in that exchange, no other casualties, either British or Batavian were reported. The action was the only significant engagement fought off the Batavian coast during 1796 as Duncan's force kept the main Batavian fleet contained within its anchorage in the Texel. In October 1797 however the main Batavian fleet was able to break out and sail on a raiding cruise towards the English coast. Duncan intercepted the fleet on its return to the Texel and inflicted a decisive defeat on the Batavians on 11 October at the Battle of Camperdown.
