= HMS Pegasus (1779) =

Frigate of the Royal Navy

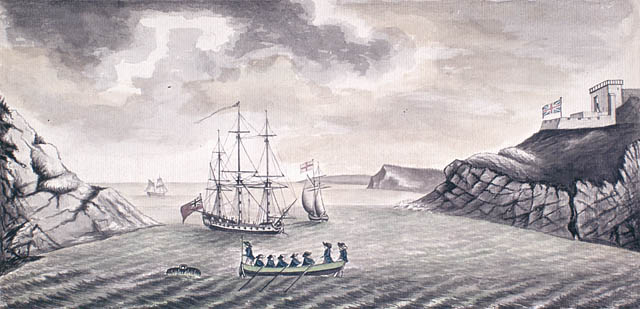
- Watercolor of what is believed to be HMS Pegasus in St. John's harbour, Newfoundland in 1786

History

Great Britain
- Name: HMS Pegasus
- Builder: Deptford Dockyard
- Launched: 1779
- Commissioned: May 1779
- Honours and awards: Naval General Service Medal with clasp "Egypt"
- Fate: Sold 1816

General characteristics
- Class & type: Enterprise-class sixth-rate frigate
- Tons burthen: 593 89/94 (bm)
- Length: 120 ft 6 in (36.7 m) (overall)
- Beam: 33 ft 6 in (10.2 m)
- Depth of hold: 11 ft (3.4 m)
- Sail plan: Full-rigged ship
- Complement: 200
- Armament: Upper deck (UD): 24 × 9-pounder guns; QD: 4 × 3-pounder guns; From 1780: UD: 24 × 9-pounder guns; QD: 4 × 6-pounder guns + 4 × 18-pounder carronades; Fc: 2 × 18-pounder carronades

HMS Pegasus was a 28-gun Enterprise-class sixth rate. This frigate was launched in 1779 at Deptford and sold in 1816. Pegasus had a relatively uneventful career and is perhaps best known for the fact that her captain from 1786 to 1789 was Prince William Henry, the future King William IV. By 1811 Pegasus was a receiving ship at Chatham; she was sold in 1816.

== Service ==
Pegasus was commissioned in May 1779 under Captain John Bazely and attached to George Rodney's fleet for the relief of the Great Siege of Gibraltar. She therefore was present at both of Rodney's actions in the campaign to relieve the fortress, participating in the seizure of a Spanish armaments convoy off Cape Finisterre on 8 January 1780 and subsequently fighting at the Battle of Cape St Vincent eight days later. Pegasus continued on with Rodney to Gibraltar and then to the West Indies where she participated in the inconclusive Battle of Martinique in April 1780. Bazely carried the dispatches of the battle back to Britain and was soon given command of Apollo.

Pegasus sailed again, now under Captain John Stanhope, for the Leeward Islands in January 1781. She returned home in August, but subsequently returned to the Caribbean. On 23 January 1783 she captured the Allegiance, a former Royal Navy sloop that the French were using as a transport and that was carrying 200 troops. Pegasus paid off into ordinary in April 1783.

In 1786 Henry Harvey became captain of the recommissioned Pegasus for service on the North America station but was disappointed to discover that his first lieutenant was Prince William Henry. The issue was that the Admiralty expected Harvey to turn over the captaincy to his subordinate as soon as the ship was at sea. Controlling his disappointment, Harvey conducted the affair with "such discretion as secured to him the lasting friendship of His Royal Highness". Within weeks, Harvey had been transferred to HMS Rose and aboard her joined Pegasus in peacetime maneuvers off the North American station until Rose was paid-off in 1789.

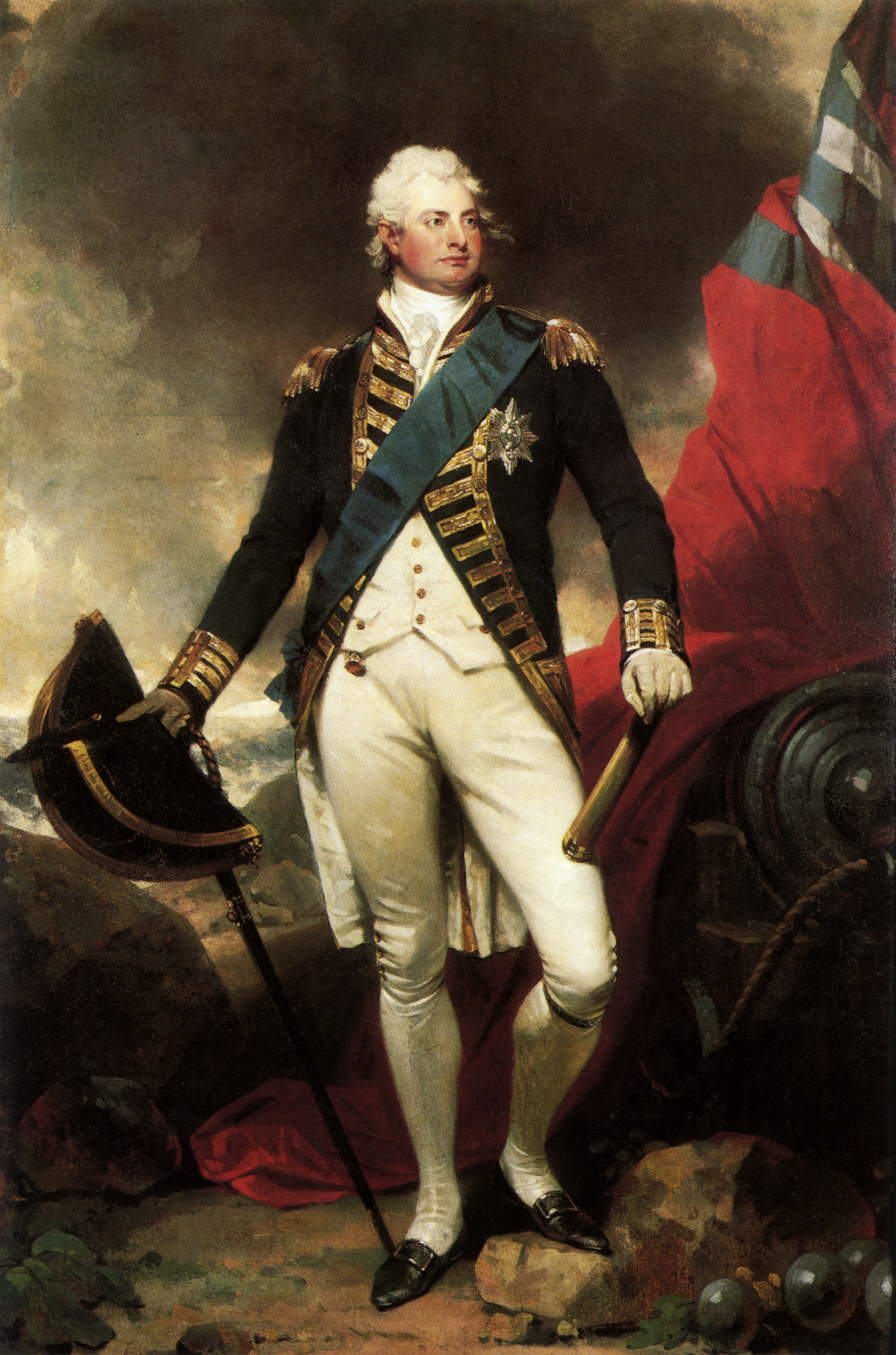
Portrait of the Duke of Clarence. Shown in dress uniform painted by Sir Martin Archer Shee, c.1800.

From 1786 to 1788, Pegasus, under Prince William Henry, was largely assigned to patrol the east coast of British North America, as well as the West Indies. In late 1786, Pegasus was stationed in the West Indies under Horatio Nelson, who wrote of Prince William Henry, "In his professional line, he is superior to two-thirds, I am sure, of the [Naval] list; and in attention to orders, and respect to his superior officer, I hardly know his equal."

Prince William Henry's first lieutenant was William Hargood, who the prince had brought with him. Other officers or crew aboard Pegasus at this time who would rise in rank were Thomas Byam Martin, John Pasco, and Charles Rowley. The prince was given a mentor, Isaac Schomberg, but that did not go well and required Nelson's intervention to resolve. Nelson also arranged for the transfer of William Johnstone Hope, who too had been appointed to Pegasus but had failed to get on with the prince. Pegasus returned to Plymouth and was decommissioned in March 1788.

Herbert Sawyer was promoted to post-captain in January 1789, and took command of Pegasus to begin her next commission. He served aboard her on the North American Station, operating off Newfoundland. On 8 July 1790 she grounded on Annet, within the Isles of Scilly but refloated on the flood tide undamaged.

=== French Revolutionary Wars ===
On 14 July 1793 Pegasus sailed with the Channel fleet from St. Helen's. On 18 July she was west of the Scilly Isle. On 31 July she briefly sighted but was unable to close the French fleet, so she returned to Torbay on 10 August. Thirteen days later she was with the Channel Fleet, escorting the Newfoundland trade and West Indian convoys while they were in home waters. By 23 October she was sailing in search of the French fleet and squadrons. On 18 November the Fleet in a brief skirmish with a French squadron; by mid-December the fleet had returned to Spithead.

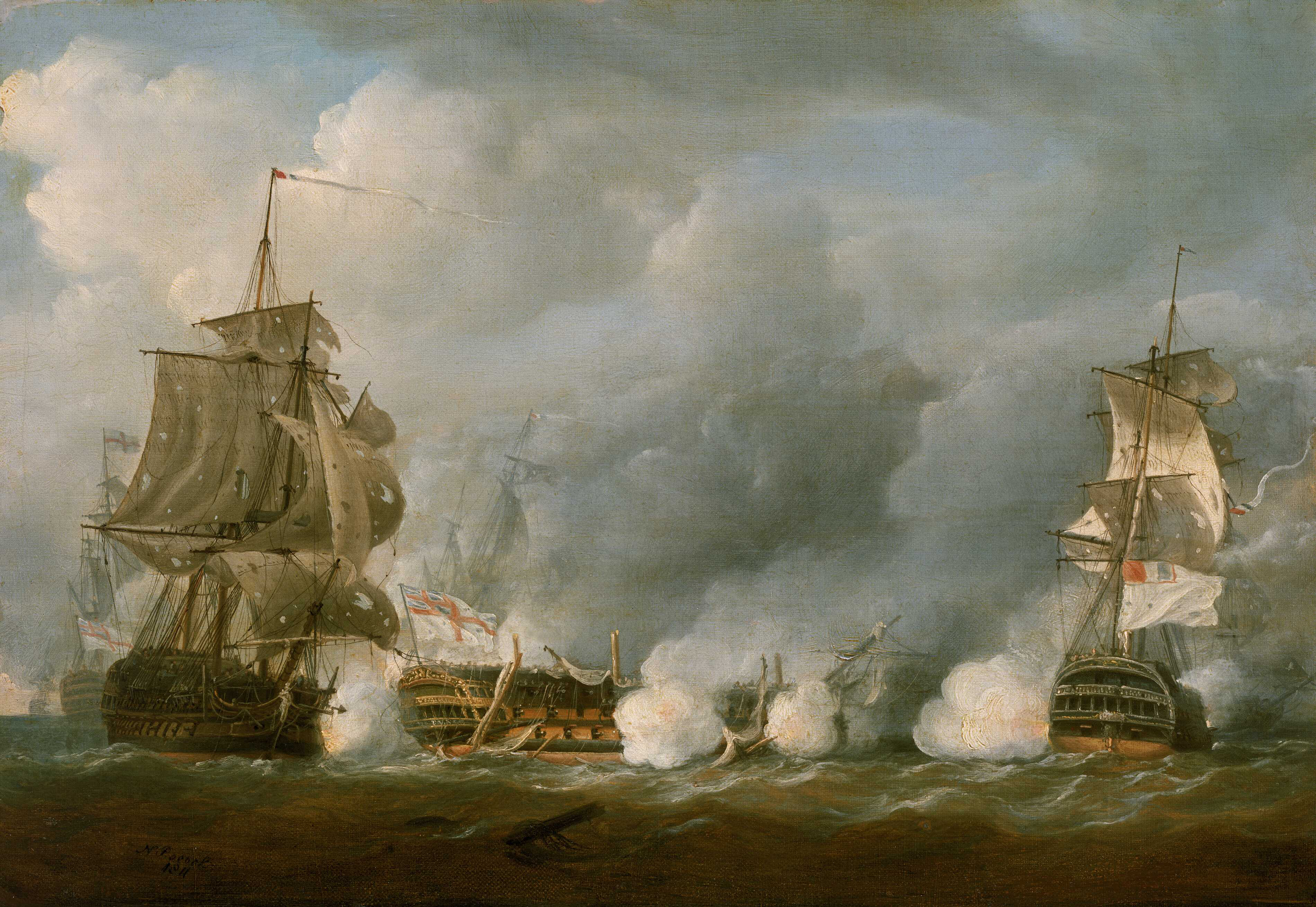
HMS Defence at the Battle of the Glorious 1st of June 1794, by Nicholas Pocock

In May–June 1794 the Channel Fleet fought the Battle of the Glorious First of June, during which it captured six ships of the line and sank a seventh. On 13 June the fleet arrived back in home ports. While under the command of Robert Barlow, who had been posted to Pegasus, she had served as a repeating ship for Admiral Howe's signals at the battle. Barlow transferred to the frigate Aquilon as a reward. At the battle, Pegasus had as passenger Nicholas Pocock, the maritime artist.

On 14 February 1795 the Channel fleet sailed from Torbay for a brief cruise and to see various convoys safe out of the Channel.

In May 1796 news reached Admiral Adam Duncan, operating in the North Sea, that a Dutch squadron consisting of the 36-gun Argo and three brigs and a cutter had departed Flickerve, Norway, bound for the Texel. Duncan despatched a squadron of his own to intercept them, consisting of the frigate Phœnix, under Captain Lawrence William Halsted, the 50-gun HMS Leopard, Pegasus and the brig-sloop HMS Sylph, all under the overall command of Halsted. The British intercepted the Dutch at 5am on 12 May, with Phoenix and Leopard chasing Argo, while Pegasus and Sylph made after the brigs. Leopard eventually fell some way behind, and consequently it was Phoenix alone that brought Argo to the action of 12 May 1796. Meanwhile, Pegasus and Sylph forced two of the brigs aground and took the small vessel accompanying the Dutch, which turned out to be a former British vessel, Duke of York. They then captured the third brig, the 16-gun Mercury. The Royal Navy took both Argo and Mercury into service, the Argo becoming Janus while Mercury became HMS Hermes.

In 1800, under Captain John Pengelly, Pegasus was fitted out as a troopship, armed en flûte. Between 8 March and 2 September 1801 Pegasus participated in the siege of Alexandria. Because Pegasus served in the navy's Egyptian campaign, her officers and crew qualified for the clasp "Egypt" to the Naval General Service Medal that the Admiralty authorised in 1850 to all surviving claimants. (Note: A first-class share of the prize money awarded in April 1823 was worth £34 2s 4d; a fifth-class share, that of a seaman, was worth 3s 11½d. The amount was small as the total had to be shared between 79 vessels and the entire army contingent.)

=== Napoleonic Wars ===
In 1803 she was in the Mediterranean. By May 1805 she was a guardship at Harwich. By 1811 Pegasus was a receiving ship at Chatham.

== Fate ==
Pegasus was sold in 1816.
