= HMS Janus (1796) =

Frigate of the Royal Navy

History

Dutch Republic & Batavian Republic
- Name: Argo
- Namesake: Argo
- Builder: Amsterdam Admiralty (Naval District)
- Laid down: 1789
- Launched: 28 January 1790

Great Britain
- Name: HMS Janus
- Namesake: Janus
- Acquired: 1796 by capture
- Fate: Sold February 1811

General characteristics
- Tons burthen: 70368/94 (bm)
- Length: Overall: 131 ft 0 in (39.9 m); Keel: 108 ft 0 in (32.9 m)
- Beam: 35 ft 0 in (10.7 m)
- Depth of hold: 11 ft 10 3/4 in (3.6 m)
- Complement: Argo: 237 (at capture); Janus: 215
- Armament: Argo: 26 × 12-pounder guns + 6 × 6-pounder guns + 4 × brass 24-pounder carronades (at capture); Janus: Upperdeck: 26 × 12-pounder guns; QD: 4 × 6-pounder guns; Fc: 2 × 6-pounder guns

HMS Janus was the Dutch fifth-rate Argo, built at the dockyard of the Amsterdam Admiralty (Naval District), and launched in 1790. HMS Phoenix captured her on 12 May 1796. The British Royal Navy took her into service as HMS Janus. She was a receiving ship by 1798 and in Ordinary by 1807. The Navy sold her in 1811.

== Capture ==
HMS Phoenix was attached to the fleet under Admiral Adam Duncan, operating in the North Sea. On 12 May 1796 at daybreak the 28-gun Pegasus and the brig-sloop Sylph brought Duncan the news that a Dutch squadron consisting of the 36-gun frigate Argo and three brigs had departed Flickeroe, Norway, bound for the Texel.

Duncan took his fleet to intercept them, sending a squadron the included Phoenix, the 50-gun Leopard, Pegasus, and Sylph northward of the Texel. The British intercepted the Dutch at 5am on 12 May. Phoenix and Leopard chased Argo, while Pegasus and Sylph made after the brigs. Leopard eventually fell some way behind, and consequently it was Phoenix alone that brought Argo to battle at 8 a.m. on 12 May.

After twenty minutes of fighting Argo struck. Phoenix had one man killed and three wounded; Argo lost six men killed and 28 wounded.

== HMS Janus ==
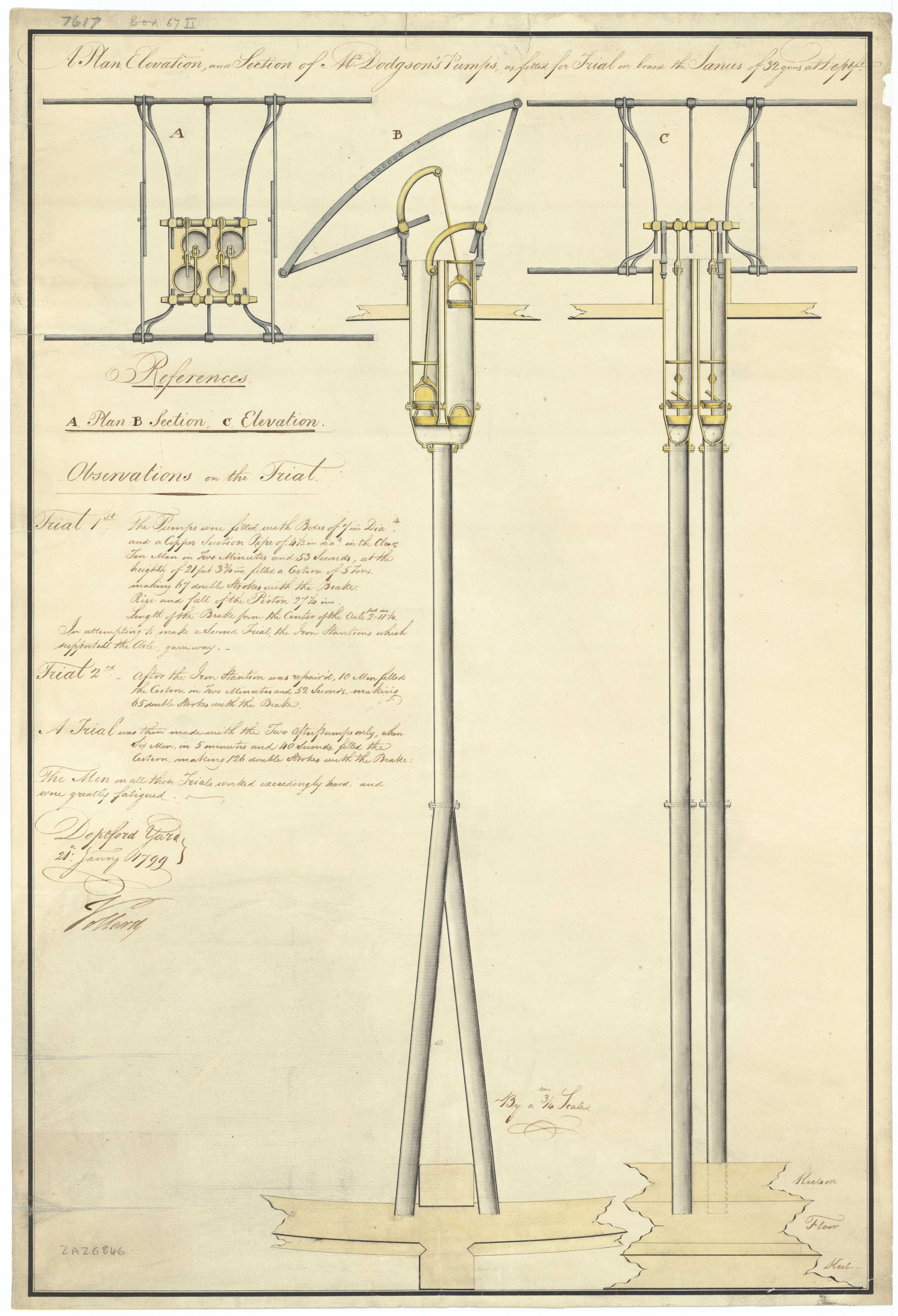
Dodgson's double-headed pump as fitted to Janus (1796)

The Royal Navy took Argo into service as HMS Janus, and commissioned her in July under Captain James Bissett. He sailed her to Jamaica in December.

On 14 April 1797 Janus encountered the French frigate Harmonie. (Note: British dispatches refer to Harmonie as Harmonie but some later writers have suggested that her name was Hermione. It was not.) Harmonie, though larger than Janus, did not offer battle but instead turned for the port of Marégot. Bissett meanwhile sailed westwards until he encountered Rear-Admiral Sir Hyde Parker's squadron off Môle-Saint-Nicolas early on the morning of 15 April. Parker had three ships of the line at his disposal, his own flagship HMS Queen, HMS Thunderer, and HMS Valiant, and he sent Thunderer and Valiant to Marégot in search of Hermione, while Queen returned to port for fresh provisions.

In the ensuing Battle of Jean-Rabel, Thunder and Valiant fired on Harmonie on the evening of 16 April, but with little effect. They returned the next day when the weather was calmer. Knowing that Harmonie could not escape, her officers drove her aground and set her on fire; eventually her powder magazine exploded, destroying her completely.

Later in 1797 Janus returned to Britain as escort to the homeward bound convoy. On 6 October 1797 Janus brought her convoy safe into The Downs.

Between November and January 1798 Janus was at Deptford being fitted as a receiving ship. By 1807 she was in Ordinary.

== Fate ==
The Principal Officers and Commissioners of His Majesty's Navy offered "Janus, of 32 guns and 700 tons", lying at Deptford, for sale on 21 February 1811. Purchasers of Janus or of several of the larger vessels offered for sale had to post a bond of £1000, with two guarantors, that the purchaser would break up their purchase within one year from the date of purchase. Janus sold on 21 February.
