= HMS Scarborough (1812) =

Vengeur-class ship of the line

- Plan view of Scarborough

History

United Kingdom
- Name: Scarborough
- Ordered: 13 July 1807
- Builder: Joseph Graham, Harwich
- Laid down: January 1808
- Launched: 29 March 1812
- Commissioned: February 1813
- Fate: Sold for scrap, 3 September 1836

General characteristics (as built)
- Class & type: Vengeur-class ship of the line
- Tons burthen: 1,745 (bm)
- Length: 176 ft (53.6 m) (gundeck)
- Beam: 47 ft 8 in (14.5 m)
- Draught: 17 ft 6 in (5.3 m) (light)
- Depth of hold: 21 ft (6.4 m)
- Sail plan: Full-rigged ship
- Complement: 590
- Armament: 74 muzzle-loading, smoothbore guns; Gundeck: 28 × 32 pdr guns; Upper deck: 28 × 18 pdr guns; Quarterdeck: 4 × 12 pdr guns + 10 × 32 pdr carronades; Forecastle: 2 × 12 pdr guns + 2 × 32 pdr carronades

HMS Scarborough was a 74-gun third rate Vengeur-class ship of the line built for the Royal Navy in the first decade of the 19th century. Completed in 1813, she played a minor role in the Napoleonic Wars.

Scarborough was sold out of the Navy in 1836.
