= French brig Albanaise =

Albanaise
History

France
- Name: Albanaise
- Builder: Ricaude du Temple, Toulon
- Laid down: April 1790
- Launched: 30 July 1790
- Captured: 3 June 1800

Great Britain
- Name: Albanaise
- Fate: Crew mutinied 23 November 1800 and handed her over to the Spanish

General characteristics
- Type: Brig
- Displacement: 359 tons (French)
- Tons burthen: 215 37/94 (bm)
- Length: 88 ft 7 3/4 in (27.0 m) (overall); 68 ft 7 1/2 in (20.9 m) (keel)
- Beam: 24 ft 3 1/2 in (7.4 m)
- Depth of hold: 11 ft 9 in (3.6 m)
- Sail plan: Brig rigged
- Complement: 100 men
- Armament: French service: Originally: 4 guns; 1795: 4 × 12-pounder + 4 × 6-pounder guns; 1799: 12 × 8-pounder guns; British service:14 guns

The French brig Albanaise (or Albannese) was launched in 1790. In June 1800, the Royal Navy captured her in the Mediterranean and took her into service as HMS Albanaise. In November 1800, her crew mutinied, took command of the vessel, and sailed her to Malaga where they surrendered her to the Spanish. The Spanish later returned her to the French, who did not return her to service.

== French service ==
Albanaise was a tartane built for the purpose of transporting lumber for shipbuilding from Albania and Italy. She was built to the specifications of a design by Ricaud du Temple, the plans for which were dated 23 September 1789 and approved on 23 October 1789. However the project was abandoned and she was employed as an ordinary transport. In late 1792 she served as a powder magazine for four small frigates converted into bomb vessels. At the time she was armed with four cannons. She then served out of Agde and Sète under enseigne de vaisseau non entretenu Bernard. (Note: The rank was "lieutenant de vaisseau non entretenu", where "non entrentenu" means "not paid", or "without a salary". The rank was that of Lieutenant, but junior to "Lieutenant de vaisseau entretenu". In addition to not being paid, an officer "non entretenu" would only wear the uniform and have authority when on service. There was a fixed number of positions for "entretenus", which required a competitive examination, while there was an unlimited number of "non entretenus", and one could obtain the status by a simple examination or by captaining a merchantman.)

In 1795 the French Navy converted her to a gun boat, of eight guns. Then between 1798 and February 1799 the French converted her to a brig, and armed her with 12 cannons.

== Capture ==
On 4 June 1800 Phoenix and Port Mahon captured Albanaise. She was sailing from Toulon with provisions for Genoa when she encountered Port Mahon, which initiated the chase about 35 miles west of Corsica. The chase lasted until early evening when Phoenix came up as Albanaise was just six miles out of Port Fino on Elba. Lieutenant Étienne J. (or S.) P. Rolland fired two broadsides and then struck. (A subsequent court martial exonerated Rolland of the loss of his vessel.) Haerlem shared in the capture, as did a number of other vessels in the squadron blockading Genoa. (Note: A later prize money announcement gave the place of capture as the Genoa Mole. A petty officer’s share of the prize money was 7s 4d and a seaman’s share was 1s 3d.)

== British service ==
The British took her into service as HMS Albanaise and commissioned her under the command of Lieutenant Francis Newcombe. On 20 September she captured the Spanish vessel Virgen del Rosario. Then on 9 October she cleared the trabaccolo Santa Maria, which was carrying linseed from Barré to Ferraro.

In November the crew of Albanaise mutinied while she was escorting a small convoy of seven merchantmen that were carrying cattle and barley from Arzew for the garrison at Gibraltar. On 22 November she had captured a small Spanish vessel and taken her eight-man crew board, while putting five men aboard the prize, including master's mate John Terrel as commander. Newcombe then took special precautions, worried about the possibility of the prisoners conspiring against their captors.

== Mutiny ==
That evening noises at midnight wakened Newcombe, who discovered that his crew were mutineering. He was able to shoot dead Hugh Keenan, one of the mutineers. Newcombe would have shot the ringleader, Jacob Godfrey, but his pistol misfired. The mutineers then overpowered him and tied him up. The mutineers also restrained the other officers and loyal crew. The next day the mutineers took Albanaise into Malaga where they surrendered her to the Spanish.

The Spaniards restored her to the French the next day. The French did not return her to service, and her subsequent fate is unknown.

== Courts martial ==
The court martial of Newcombe and his officers for their conduct during the mutiny took place on 7 June 1801 on board Kent off Alexandria. The court acquitted Newcombe and his officers, judging that the crew (many of whom were foreigners), had risen and overpowered the officers or restrained them and that the gunner, Mr. Lewyn, was to be especially commended for having resisted until wounded. The court gave its opinion that Lieutenant William Prosser Kent was unfit to hold a commission in the Navy because he refused, "from mistaken religious motives", to give his evidence under oath. It further stated that it had reason to believe that Master’s Mate John Tyroll (or Tyrell), although away in a prize at the time of the mutiny, knew of the plan and had not given warning. The court recommended further investigation into the crewmen Alexander M’Kiever and Thomas Parsons, who had been seen armed.

Godfrey was hanged in January 1802. Four crewmen were tried on Donegal in Portsmouth on 18 June 1802. Tyroll was acquitted, the only evidence against him being an ambiguous statement by Godfrey and hearsay from another mutineer who was never caught. Furthermore, Tyroll's conduct in the year after the mutiny, when he had been transferred from vessel to vessel, had been exemplary as he participated in some 30 boat and other actions. The other three, Parsons, M’Keiver and J. Marriott, had returned from Malaga with Newcombe. The court martial board ordered that all three were to forfeit all pay and were to be incarcerated for three months in the Marshalsea. In addition, M’Keiver received 50 lashes and Marriott 100.

The British later captured several of the mutineers. Three more were tried on 27 September 1802 aboard Centaur. The court martial acquitted one man and sentenced another to 300 lashes. The court judged a third man, Patrick (or Henry) Kennedy, to have been a ringleader and ordered him tried separately. He was tried on 5 October and was sentenced to be hanged. He was hanged aboard Hussar on 16 October. (Note: Kennedy had been discovered in Bridewell where he was serving a six-month sentence for robbery. He willed his considerable prize money to Mr. Ford, keeper of the Bridewell, and W. Swete, Sheriff Officer for the County of Devon.)

== See also ==
- List of ships captured in the 18th century
- List of ships captured in the 19th century
