= HMS Hermes (1798) =

History

Great Britain
- Name: Hermes
- Builder: Thomas Hearn, North Shields
- Launched: 1797
- Fate: Sold c.1798

Great Britain
- Name: HMS Hermes
- Acquired: 1798 by purchase
- Fate: Sold 1802

United Kingdom
- Name: Hermes
- Acquired: 1802 by purchase
- Captured: 1805

General characteristics
- Type: Ship-sloop
- Tons burthen: 313, or 331 (bm)
- Length: Overall:100 ft 0 in (30.5 m); Keel:77 ft 0 in (23.5 m)
- Beam: 28 ft 5 in (8.7 m)
- Depth of hold: 11 ft 0 in (3.4 m)
- Propulsion: Sails
- Sail plan: Ship-rigged
- Armament: British service: Upper deck:16 × 32-pounder carronades; Fc:2 × 12-pounder carronades

HMS Hermes was the mercantile Hermes launched at Shields in 1797. The British Royal Navy purchased her in 1798 and sold her in 1802 after the Treaty of Amiens. She then returned to mercantile service as a West Indiaman. The French captured her in 1805.

== Career ==
=== Royal Navy ===
The Navy purchased Hermes in 1798 for £2,900 and had her fitted at Gravesend and Deptford.

Commander Henry Vansittart commissioned her in May for the North Sea. Around October he transferred to Bonetta.

In 1799 she was under the command of Commander Jeffrey (Baron von) Reigerafeld. In November she was under the command of Commander David Gilmour. Around January 1801 her captain was Commander James Watson.

Hermes apparently spent her brief navy service convoying in the North Sea, serving without incident.

Disposal: The "Principal Officers and Commissioners of His Majesty's Navy" offered "Hermes, 313 Tons, lying, at Sheerness" for sale on 30 June 1802. The Navy sold Hermes in June 1802.

=== Mercantile service ===
Hermes first appeared in Lloyd's Register (LR) in 1803 with J.Grant, master, changing to Chapman, Henly, owner, and trade London–Jamaica.

== Fate ==
Lloyd's List (LL) reported on 5 April 1805 that Hermes, Chapman, master, had been captured while sailing from Jamaica to London. Her captors took her into Guadeloupe.
