= HMS Hermes (1796) =

Brig-sloop of the Royal Navy

History

Dutch Republic/Batavian Republic
- Name: Mercuur
- Launched: 1781
- Captured: 12 May 1796

Great Britain
- Name: HMS Hermes
- Acquired: 1796 by capture
- Fate: Foundered 31 January 1797

General characteristics
- Type: brig-sloop
- Tons burthen: 210 (bm)
- Length: 85 Amsterdam feet (Note: All linear measurements are in Amsterdam feet (voet) of 11 Amsterdam inches (duim) (see Dutch units of measurement). The Amsterdam foot is about 8% shorter than an English foot.)
- Beam: 30 Amsterdam feet
- Depth of hold: 13 Amsterdam feet
- Propulsion: Sails
- Complement: Dutch service:150; At capture:85; Royal Navy:80
- Armament: Dutch service: 12-24 guns; At capture:16 guns; British service: 14 × 24-pounder carronades + 2 × 6-pounder chase guns

HMS Hermes was the Dutch cutter Mercuur, that the Amsterdam Admiralty purchased in 1781 or 1782. (Mercuur was a brig when captured.) HMS Sylph captured her off the Texel in the action of 12 May 1796 after a chase during which Mercuur threw all but two of her guns overboard.

The Royal Navy commissioned her in July 1796 under Commander William Mulso, for the North Sea.

Hermes disappeared during a gale on 31 January 1797. She was presumed to have foundered with all hands.
