= HMS Sylph (1795) =

Brig-sloop of the Royal Navy, in service 1795-1811

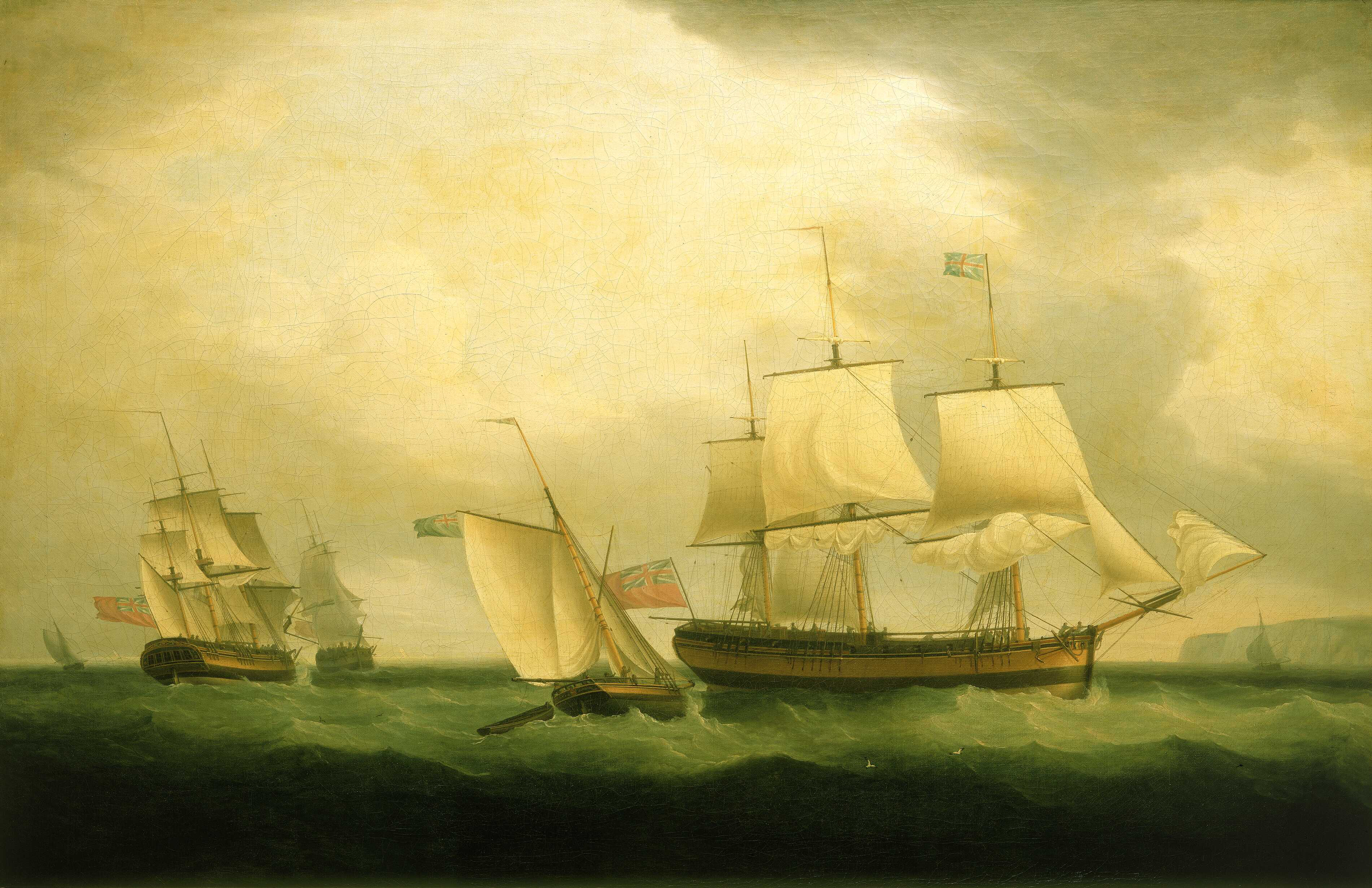
- HMS Sylph (R) and the cutter Mary Ann, 1795

History

Great Britain
- Name: HMS Sylph
- Namesake: Sylph
- Ordered: 13 July 1795
- Cost: £5,322
- Laid down: July 1795
- Launched: 3 September 1795
- Completed: 23 September 1795
- Commissioned: August 1795
- Fate: Broken up, April 1811

General characteristics
- Class & type: Albatross-class brig-sloop
- Tons burthen: 36952/94 (bm)
- Length: 96 ft 2 in (29.3 m) (gundeck); 73 ft 10 1/2 in (22.5 m) (keel)
- Beam: 30 ft 8 in (9.3 m)
- Depth of hold: 12 ft 9 in (3.9 m)
- Propulsion: Sails
- Complement: 121
- Armament: Gun deck: 16 × 32-pounder carronades + 2 × 6-pounder bow chasers

HMS Sylph was a 16-gun Albatross-class brig-sloop of the Royal Navy designed by William Rule and launched in 1795 at Deptford Dockyard. Her namesake was the air spirit sylph. She commissioned in August 1795 under Commander John Chambers White, who would have her until the end of 1799. She was later commanded by Charles Dashwood.

Sylph was an active ship through the French Revolutionary Wars, participating in actions such as the action of 12 May 1796 and taking a number of warships and privateers during service as a blockade and patrol ship. The majority of her service would be spent in the North Sea, English Channel and off the coast of Spain. Sylph served actively until 1805, when she was laid up at Portsmouth. She was broken up there in 1811.

== Construction ==
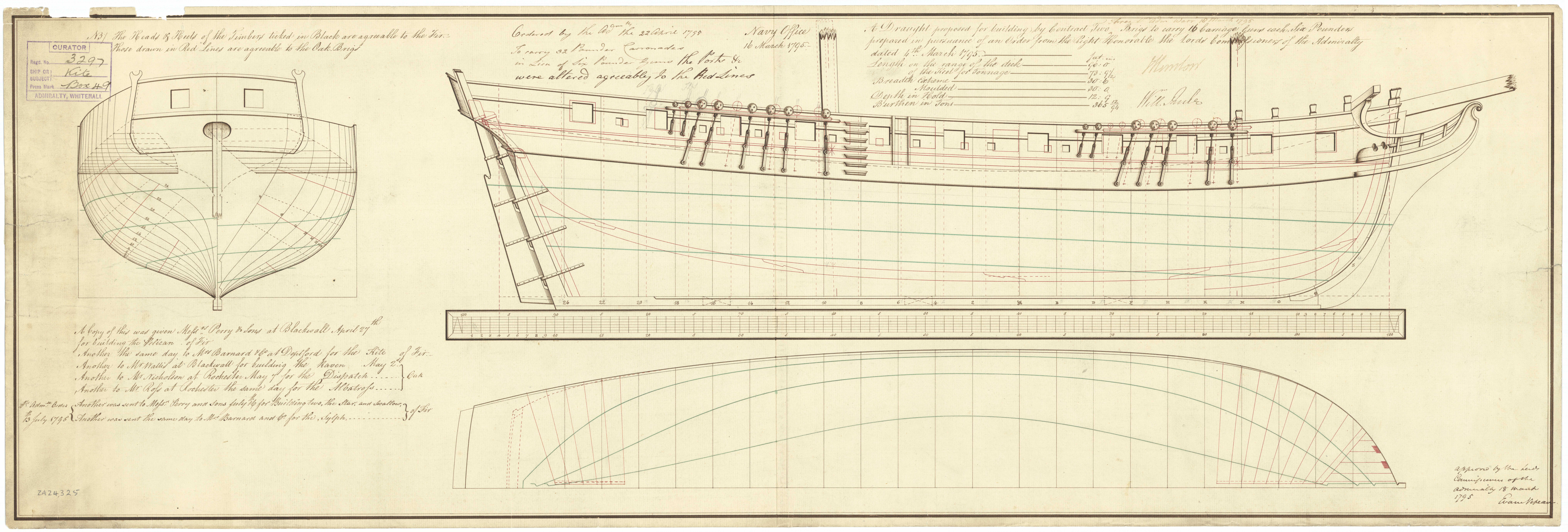
Drawing showing the body plan used to build Sylph and other ships, 1795

Sylph was a 16-gun, 32-pound carronade brig-sloop. She was part of the Albatross-class designed by William Rule and approved on 22 April 1795. Of the five ships in the class three, including Sylph, were built of fir, likely due to a wartime lack of other available materials. The class was established to help meet the need for extra ships for convoy duties. Sylph and her class were originally planned to have sixteen 6-pound long guns, but the Admiralty Order of 22 April also established the ships with carronades instead. Sylph was ordered on 13 July as part of a contract to the yard of William Barnard, however Barnard had died in March and the construction of Sylph was organised by his widow and two sons. Sylph was completed with the following dimensions: 96 feet 2 inches (29.3 m) along the gun deck, 73 feet 10 1/2 inches (22.5 m) at the keel, with a beam of 30 feet 8 inches (9.3 m) and a depth in the hold of 12 feet 9 inches (3.9 m). She measured 36952/94 tons burthen.

Sylph was launched on 3 September 1795 and fitted out between 10 and 23 September at Deptford Dockyard. While her class nominally held 32-pound carronades, they proved too heavy for the small ships and were replaced in most vessels with smaller 24-pound carronades.

== Service ==
=== 1796 ===
Sylph was commissioned under Commander John Chambers White, who would command her into 1799, on 28 August 1795. She first served in the North Sea Fleet of Admiral Adam Duncan. Sylph was sent with HMS Leopard, HMS Phoenix, and HMS Pegasus to intercept a small Dutch squadron that had recently sailed from Norway. (Note: See Action of 12 May 1796) The Dutch were spotted on 12 May 1796 off the Texel, and consisted of the 36-gun frigate Argo, the 18-gun Echo, 16-gun Mercury, and 14-gun De Grier (all brigs), and the cutter Duke of York, which was a prize of Argo. The brigs immediately attempted to escape and were chased by Sylph and Pegasus while Phoenix pursued the frigate, Leopard being too slow to assist. After a battle of twenty minutes Argo surrendered to Phoenix, while De Grier and Echo were driven ashore and Mercury, despite throwing fourteen of her sixteen guns overboard to lose weight, taken by Sylph. (Note: Argo was taken into Royal Navy service as HMS Janus.)

From around August Sylph was a part of Commodore John Borlase Warren's blockading squadron in the Channel. On 22 August this squadron, consisting of four frigates and Sylph, was cruising off the mouth of the Gironde when they discovered and chased the French 32-gun frigate Andromaque. HMS Galatea and Sylph cut Andromaque off from the river and while they lost sight of her overnight, Andromaque was driven ashore on the morning of 23 August. Sylph fired into her as she lay on shore and then sent her boats in to burn her in the afternoon. She took the 4-gun privateer cutter Le Phoenix in the English Channel in September.

=== 1797 ===
On 17 July 1797 Sylph participated in the destruction of the French 28-gun frigate La Calliope off the coast of Brittany. (Note: This class of frigate usually served as 32 or 34-gun frigates rather than the stated 28.) Sylph was in company with HMS Pomone, HMS Artois, HMS Anson, and the cutter Dolly when they came across a French convoy of fourteen ships guarded by Calliope, a corvette, and a brig-corvette off Ushant at Hodierne Bay. The two corvettes were able to use their speed to escape the squadron, but Calliope was not able to follow them and instead chose to cut away her masts and run herself on shore at 2:20 A.M. so as to not be taken by the British. At 7 A.M. Anson anchored near the beached Calliope and a brig attempting to assist her, and fired on them. Realising that Anson was too far away to do significant damage, Captain White moved Sylph in between Calliope and Anson at 9:30 A.M. and began a 'well-directed fire' at Calliope. At 11:30 A.M. Anson left to rejoin Pomone and Artois, but Sylph stayed to continue firing on Calliope until 6 P.M. when she was recalled by Warren in Pomone. The efforts of Sylph meant that the French were unable to salvage any of Calliope, and the frigate broke up on the shore the next day. Sylph lost five seamen and one marine wounded, but on top of Calliope's destruction, one transport ship, three brigs, and four chasse-marées were taken, and two other ships run ashore.

Less than a month later on 11 August she participated in an attack on another enemy convoy. Sylph was sailing with Pomone, HMS Jason, and HMS Triton when early in the morning the convoy of brigs and chasse-marées was spotted off the coast of Vendée. The convoy was protected by the 22-gun corvette Réolaise and three or four smaller gun vessels; these ran to the mouth of the Les Sables-d'Olonne river to receive protection from a fort stationed there. Captain White of Sylph volunteered to sail in and begin firing at the vessels despite this, and did so at 11:30 A.M. Sylph opened fire from around one mile away, receiving fire in turn from the anchored ships and fort, and was joined in her endeavour at noon by Pomone and Jason while Triton chased members of the convoy away. After around forty-five minutes of firing, Sylph cut her cable and stood out from the river mouth having had one master's mate and two seamen killed. The attack was successful with one 12-gun gun-brig destroyed and the corvette heavily damaged. On 27 August Sylph was sailing with the same group of ships at the mouth of the Gironde when they discovered and chased another French convoy. They chased the convoy all night and the two fastest, Triton and Jason, captured five of the ships.

=== 1798 ===
In February 1798 Sylph was present at the capture of the 18-gun privateer La Légere, and took the French chasse-marée La Sainte Famille with HMS Impétueux on 5 April. On 16 September a French expedition commanded by Jean-Baptiste-François Bompart consisting of the ship of the line Hoche, eight frigates, a schooner, and 3,000 soldiers, left Brest to sail for Ireland as reinforcements to the invasion of General Jean Humbert. (Note: See Order of battle at the Battle of Tory Island for French ship details.) Sylph was part of a small squadron including HMS Boadicea and HMS Ethalion which spotted the expedition off Pointe du Raz at daybreak on 17 September. Ethalion and Sylph were left to follow the French as they made sail, later being joined by HMS Amelia and Anson. While the French made attempts to dislodge the following British ships and confuse them as to their destination, by 23 September Captain George Countess of Ethalion was sure of their path towards Ireland, and Sylph was sent to warn the commander-in-chief of the Irish Station of the approaching ships. The warning provided by Sylph and the squadron allowed the Royal Navy to bring together a force to attack Bompart's ships, resulting in the Battle of Tory Island on 12 October and a series of follow-up actions which saw Hoche and five of the frigates captured.

=== 1799 ===
Alongside HMS Mermaid she took the Spanish 4-gun packet Golondrina off Corunna on 24 May 1799. (Note: Golondrina was pierced as a 20-gun ship but did not have the majority in place.) On 2 July she took part in an attempt on some Spanish ships in Aix Roads. This Spanish squadron had sailed from Brest at the end of May and was cornered by the fleet of Lord Bridport on 4 June, at which point they retired to the fortified port of Île-d'Aix. Bridport left a blockading force commanded by Rear-Admiral Charles Morice Pole of six ships of the line, three bomb vessels, four frigates, and Sylph, off the island. On 2 July Pole moved his ships of the line into the Roads, and the smaller vessels closer to Aix itself. The intent was to protect the three bomb vessels as they bombarded the anchored Spanish ships. However, the Spaniards were protected by two forts on land as well as a floating battery of mortars, which Sylph reported to Pole had a much higher range than the British ships. At 3 P.M. a number of Spanish gun boats advanced and opened fire on them, forcing by 4:30 P.M. the British ships to cease their bombardment and sail out of range of the Spaniards. Neither side was very damaged, but the Spanish claimed it as a victory.

On 2 August command of Sylph was handed to Commander Charles Dashwood, who on 17 November took the French 8-gun lugger Fouine while watching the French fleet in Brest. On 18 December Sylph, along with Ethalion and HMS Fisgard, was blown off station by a severe gale. Ethalion returned to her position off Brest first, and was wrecked on 24 December. 150 survivors were rescued by the boats of Sylph, HMS Nimrod, and HMS Danae, before they were transferred to Sylph who brought them to Plymouth on 26 December.

=== 1800–1801 ===
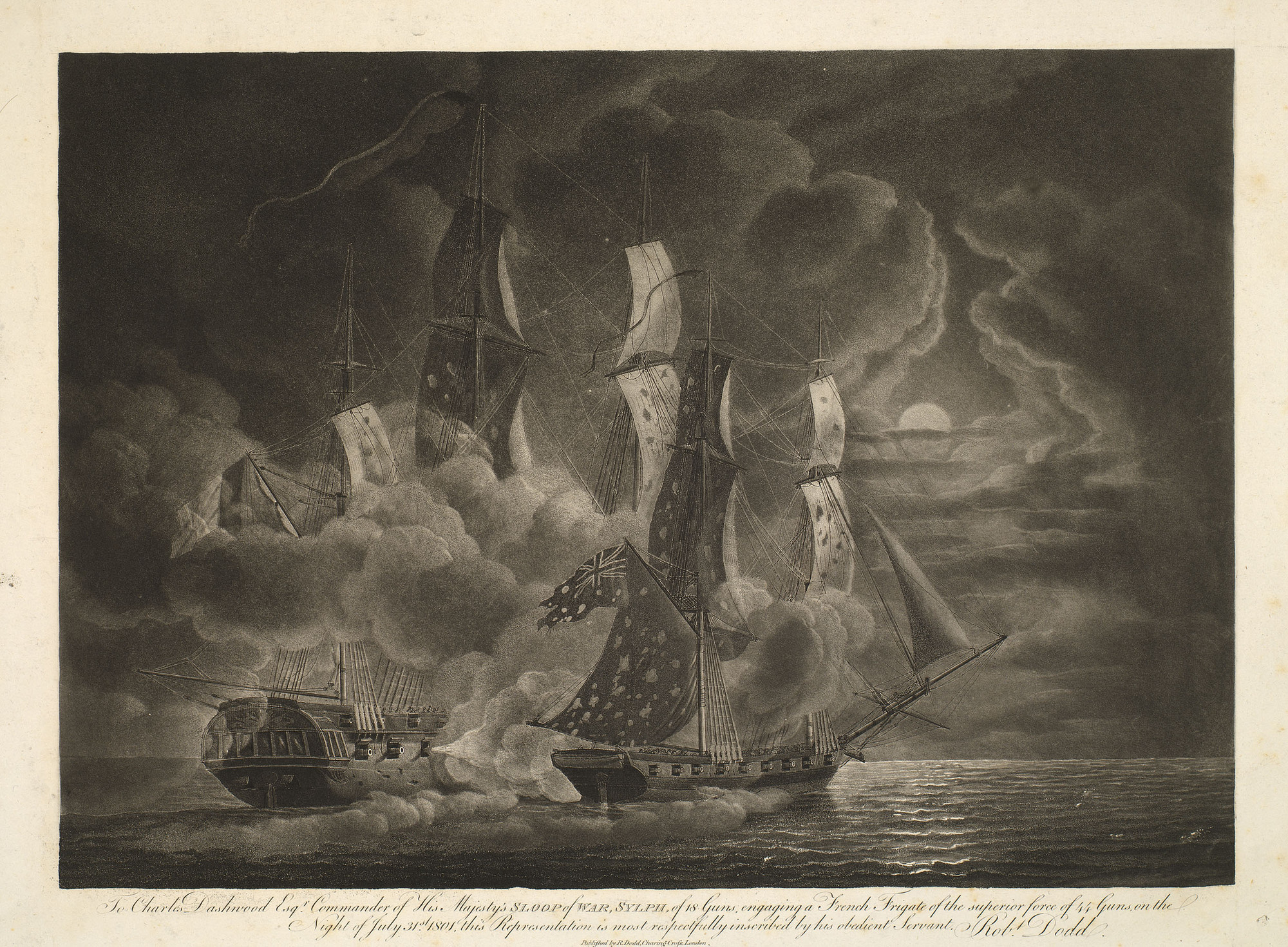
Sylph in action off Santander against a French frigate (44) on the night of 31 July 1801 was heavily damaged before breaking off, by Robert Dodd

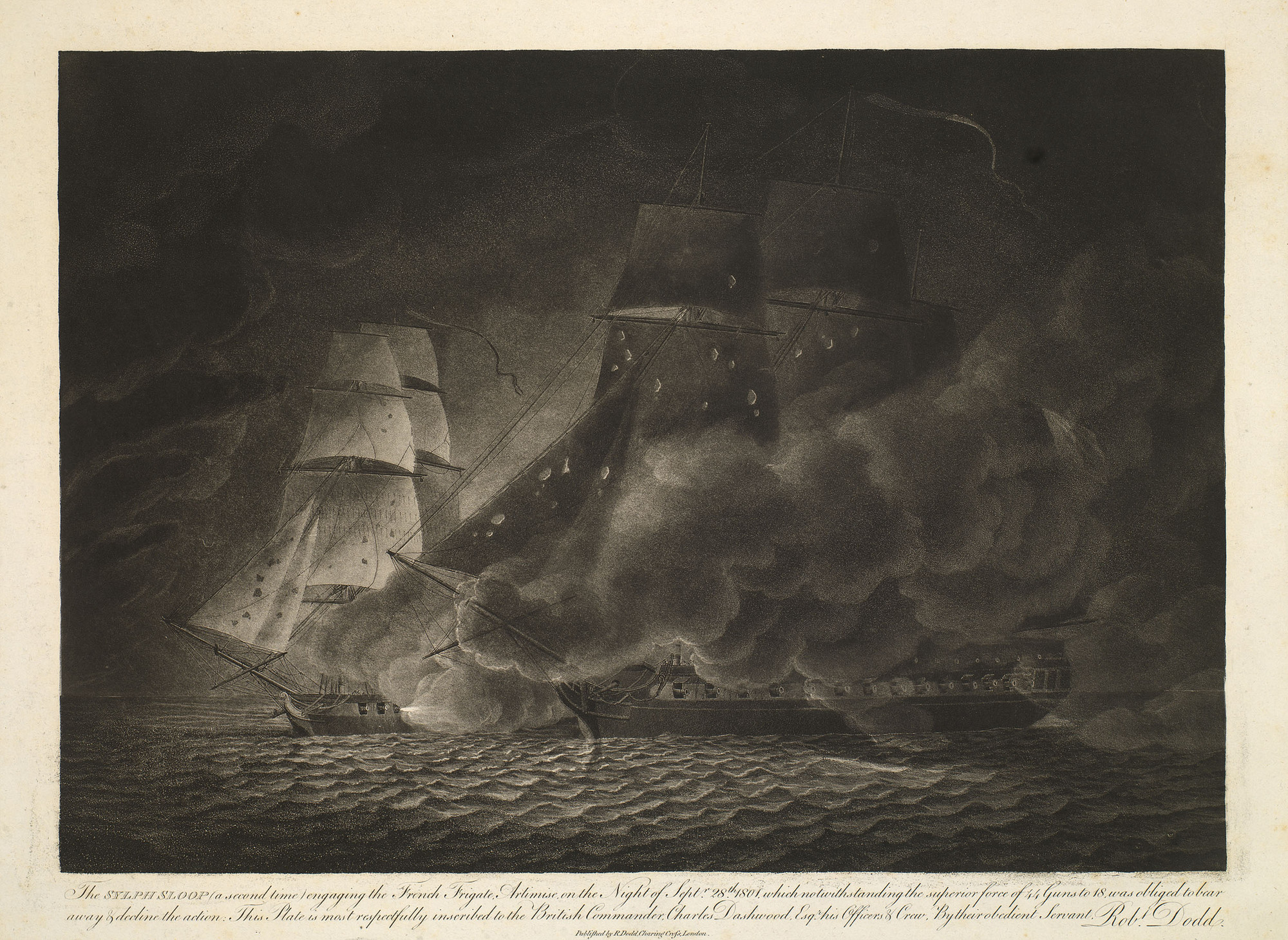
Sylph meets French frigate Artémise (44) on the night of 28 September 1801 at Cape Penas, 1801 and was obliged to bear away and decline the action:

Sylph continued to patrol the northern coast of Spain and the Channel in 1800-1; she fought two actions with unidentified ships off Santander on 31 July and 28 September of the latter year. These actions may have been against a 44-gun French frigate apparently called L'Artemise. On 31 July Sylph was chasing an armed schooner off Santander which the enemy frigate arrived to protect. The wind was not favourable for her to escape the much larger enemy, and so Sylph prepared to engage her; the engagement lasted one hour and twenty minutes in which one man was killed and nine wounded before Sylph withdrew to make repairs. At daybreak on 1 August the enemy frigate was spotted by Sylph seemingly in a disabled state, but the damaged state of Sylph meant she was too slow in advancing on the frigate, which escaped. After the combat she was filling with 1 foot 6 inches (0.5 m) of water an hour but managed to reach the Channel Fleet from where she was ordered by Admiral William Cornwallis to go to Plymouth for repairs, which she did on 14 August. Having been repaired, Sylph resumed her station off the coast of north Spain, and on 28 September discovered a French frigate of the same force as her earlier adversary. At 7:30 P.M. the two ships engaged each other from extremely close distance, exchanging broadsides for two hours and five minutes before the frigate disengaged, leaving Sylph with heavy damage to her rigging but again with minimal casualties, only one man injured. Commander Dashwood was promoted to post-captain for his bravery in these two engagements. (Note: There is severe doubt over who the opponent of Sylph was in these two engagements. While it was accepted that her opponent was a large warship, there is no evidence of a French frigate called L'Artemise existing in 1801, and doubt has been cast over a 44-gun frigate doing such minimal damage to a smaller and lighter enemy like Sylph. William Laird Clowes suggested the ship was some kind of French or Spanish privateer.)

=== Later service ===
By November Sylph was under Commander William Goate based in the Channel and North Sea on blockade duties. She was decommissioned during the Peace of Amiens but recommissioned to continue the same services in February 1803. On the night of 17 December 1804 Sylph, HMS Thisbe, and HMS Niobe were all forced to cut away their masts to save themselves from being destroyed during a gale off Guernsey. Sylph was repaired and stayed on station until the end of 1805. The ship was laid up at Portsmouth in November and broken up there in April 1811.
