= Perseverance-class frigate =

Frigate class of the Royal Navy

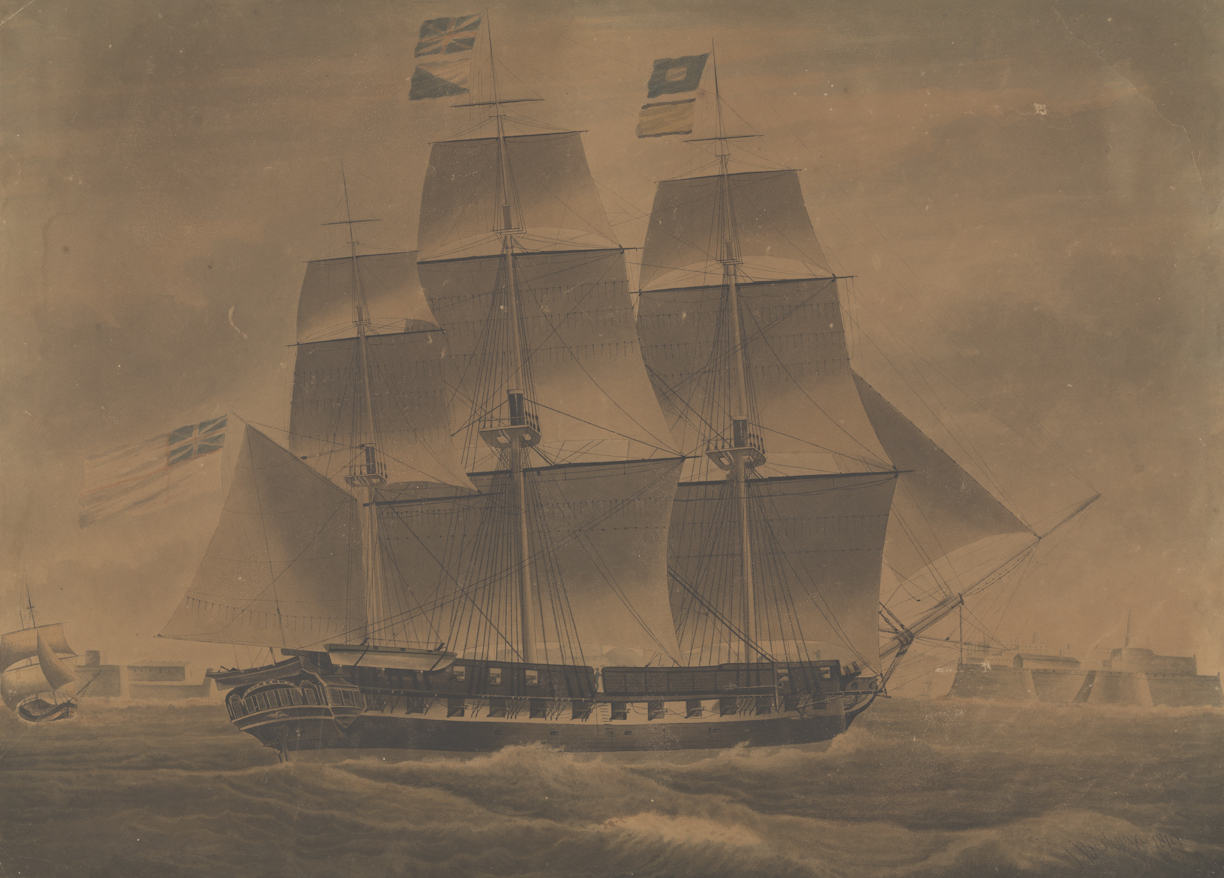
- 1819 illustration of Phoenix off Malta

Class overview
- Name: Perseverance-class frigate
- Operators: Royal Navy
- Preceded by: Minerva class
- Succeeded by: Pallas class
- Built: 1780–1783, 1801–1811
- In service: 1781–1874
- Planned: 12
- Completed: 11
- Canceled: 1
- Lost: 5

General characteristics first iteration
- Type: Fifth-rate frigate
- Tons burthen: 871 42/94 (bm)
- Length: 137 ft (41.8 m) (gundeck); 113 ft 5 1/2 in (34.6 m) (keel)
- Beam: 38 ft (11.6 m)
- Depth of hold: 13 ft 5 in (4.1 m)
- Propulsion: Sails
- Complement: 260, later 270
- Armament: Gun deck: 26 × 18-pounder guns; QD: 8 × 9-pounder guns + 4 × 18-pounder carronades; Fc: 2 × 9-pounder guns + 4 × 18-pounder carronades + 14 × 1/2-pounder swivel guns

General characteristics second iteration
- Type: Fifth-rate frigate
- Tons burthen: 869 50/94 (bm)
- Length: 137 ft (41.8 m) (gundeck); 113 ft 2 1/2 in (34.5 m) (keel)
- Beam: 38 ft (11.6 m)
- Depth of hold: 13 ft 5 in (4.1 m)
- Propulsion: Sails
- Complement: 260, later 264
- Armament: Gun deck: 26 × 18-pounder guns; QD: 2 × 9-pounder guns + 10 × 32-pounder carronades; Fc: 2 × 9-pounder guns + 2 × 32-pounder carronades

The Perseverance-class frigate was a 36-gun, later 42-gun, 18-pounder fifth-rate frigate class of twelve ships of the Royal Navy, constructed in two batches. Designed by Surveyor of the Navy Sir Edward Hunt the first iteration, consisting of four ships, was constructed as a rival to the similar Flora-class frigate. Strongly built ships, the Perseverance class provided favourable gunnery characteristics and was highly manoeuvrable, but bought these traits with a loss of speed. The name ship of the class, Perseverance, was ordered in 1779 and participated in the American Revolutionary War, but her three sister ships were constructed too late to take part. The class continued in service after the war, but soon became outdated.

In 1801 the new First Lord of the Admiralty Admiral Lord St Vincent brought back the Perseverance class in an attempt to save money and resources in ship construction by producing older and less elaborate designs than those his predecessor Lord Spencer had built. Five new Perseverance-class frigates were initially ordered in 1801, but one of these was cancelled before construction had begun. A year later two frigates were ordered to be built on contract at Bombay Dockyard, and a final ship of the class was accidentally ordered in 1808. This second iteration of the class retained the earlier gunnery characteristics, but the sailing issues of the old design were not improved on and the ships were very slow when compared to other modern designs.

The ships of the class saw wide-ranging service throughout the French Revolutionary and Napoleonic Wars, serving on blockades, in fleets, and on cruises on a large variety of Royal Navy stations. Key actions of the class include Phoenix in the battle of Tellicherry, action of 12 May 1796, and battle of Cape Ortegal, and Iphigenia at the battle of Grand Port. Of the eleven completed ships of the class five were lost in shipwrecks, while Iphigenia was captured by the French at Grand Port but later recaptured. The last extant ship of the class was Salsette, one of the two Bombay ships, which was broken up in 1874 having spent almost forty years as a receiving ship.

== Design and construction ==
=== First iteration ===
==== Background ====
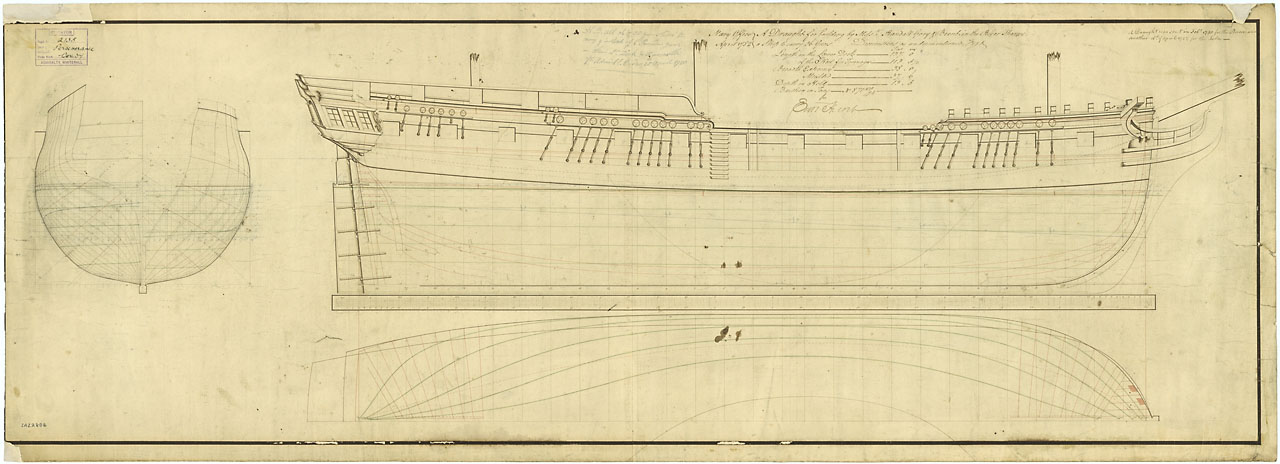
The 1781 lines of Perseverance, demonstrating the design of the first iteration

In the early years of the American Revolutionary War the British Admiralty noted the success of the French Navy's large frigates of twenty-eight and thirty main guns. These frigates were mostly armed with 18-pounders, a larger calibre than that of the Royal Navy's general use. In response to these French frigates the Admiralty demanded that the Navy Board provide designs for a new series of British frigates that would be able to outperform the new generation of French ships. These new classes were to have 18-pounders instead of the Royal Navy's usual choice of 12-pounders and were to be of a minimum of thirty-two guns overall. Surveyors of the Navy Sir Edward Hunt and Sir John Williams each brought forth a design, Hunt's of thirty-eight guns and Williams' of thirty-six.

These classes would go on to be known as the Minerva and Flora class frigates, respectively. One frigate of each design was ordered by the Admiralty to be built on 6 November 1778. With these initial two classes holding different amounts of guns, other ships of different but equivalent designs were required to further evaluate them. Hunt was employed again to provide an alternative design to the Flora class, of thirty-six guns total.

==== Design ====
The design Hunt came up with was the Perseverance-class frigate. This was a slightly shortened equivalent of the Minerva class. The class was very similar in design to the Flora class despite the intentions for the two to be evaluated against each other, however the Perseverance design was sharper than Flora. One of the most noticeable differences between the two classes was that the Perseverance class had slightly longer rails on their quarterdecks. Both thirty-six gun ship classes were built quite heavily and were known to be very robust in their construction, most likely because the designers had erred on the side of caution when drawing up the new ships.

As well as this the ships would go on to be thought of very favourably in combat, because even when victualled for long journeys they provided a large amount of freeboard with which to keep guns in use. As well as this, the guns themselves were seven feet apart from each other, providing more operating space than was common. (Note: Despite this the class, along with the other variants designed in the 1780s, were still thought to be too small for their armaments.) These favourable gunnery characteristics came at a cost to the class's speed, however, but they made up for this by retaining a high level of manoeuvrability and were very weatherly.

==== Construction and armament ====
The first ship of the class, Perseverance, was ordered on 3 December 1779. In response to positive trials of all three designs by Hunt and Williams, more vessels were ordered later in the Revolutionary War to a variety of civilian dockyards. Three further vessels would be built of the Perseverance class, but in this early stage of war the speed of civilian construction was still slow, with the average length of construction being eighteen months. This meant that only Perseverance herself was launched in time to see any service in the war the class was built for. To avoid the creation of jealous tensions between Hunt and Williams, as was often the case when the surveyors designed similar ships, the later ships of the Perseverance and Flora classes were ordered in a pattern alternating between the two classes. (Note: While this was successful and the pattern of construction suggests no favouritism, later opinions would favour the Perseverance class.) These early classes of 18-pounder frigates were not extensively built after the war because by 1790 the Pallas-class frigate had been adopted as the standard design, but because the majority of the class missed the Revolutionary War they were saved from the strenuous services many ships underwent during that conflict, and thus had longer service lives than might have been expected.

All ships of the class were constructed to the following dimensions: 137 feet (41.8 m) along the gun deck, 113 feet 5 1/2 inches (34.6 m) at the keel, with a beam of 38 feet (11.6 m) and a depth in the hold of 13 feet 5 inches (4.1 m). They measured 871 42/94 tons burthen and were to have a crew of 260 men. (Note: While the majority of measurements were adhered to in the construction of the individual ships of the class, no ship succeeded in being 871 42/94 tons burthen, with the ships in order of construction weighing 882, 884, 890, and 881 tons burthen respectively.) Initially the armament of the class was set at twenty-six 18-pounders on the gundeck, four 6-pounders on the quarterdeck, and two 6-pounders on the forecastle. On 30 September 1779 four 18-pound carronades were added to the quarterdeck and another four were added to the forecastle in response to the new carronade establishment ordered by the Admiralty. Also on the forecastle, fourteen 1/2-pounder swivel guns were added. (Note: Gardiner records the number of swivel guns added as twelve.)

The carronades added in the 1779 establishment were later found to be widely impracticable in the frigates and the majority of them were removed by the end of the Revolutionary War; by July 1782 Perseverance had only two of her quarterdeck carronades remaining. The final armament change for the class came on 25 April 1780 when all the 6-pounders were replaced with 9-pounders. At the same time as this the complement of men for the class was increased to 270 to reflect the increased size of much of the weaponry being carried on board. The ships would in later years be classified on paper as 42-gun frigates.

=== Second iteration ===
==== Background ====
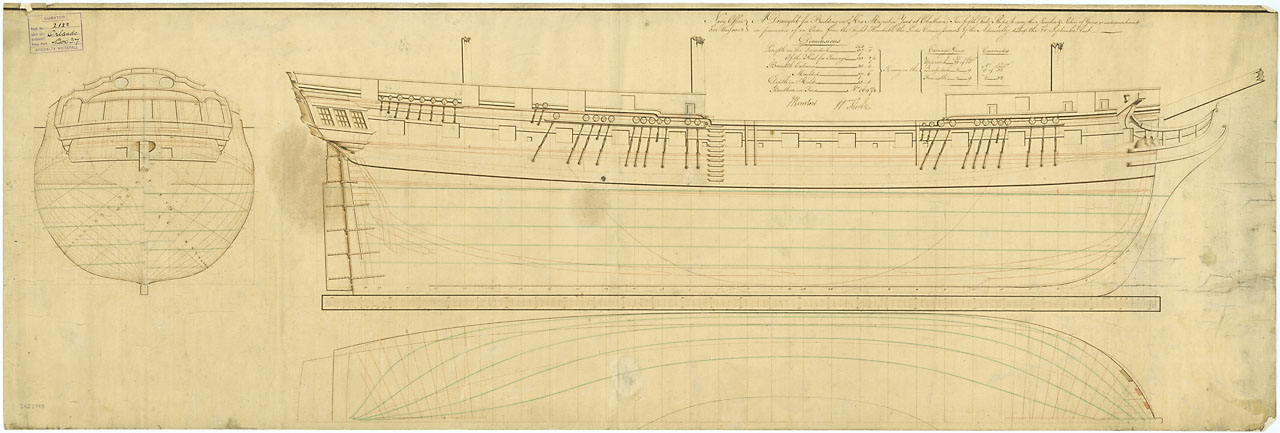
The 1811 lines of Orlando, demonstrating the standard design of the second iteration

In the 1790s the First Lord of the Admiralty, Lord Spencer, moved the Royal Navy away from a policy of building small, cost-efficient vessels that resulted in a large fleet, and instead championed the building of larger and more expensive ships that could help counter French and Spanish ships that had not been designed under similar constraints. By 1800 the majority of British frigates were of a similar size to those of other nations, but this new fleet had been very expensive to construct. In February 1801 a new administration brought in a new First Lord, Admiral Lord St Vincent. With threats of invasion ongoing and peace with France being uncertain, St Vincent was tasked with continuing to build frigates at the same pace as his predecessor, but with far less extravagance and expense.

St Vincent, an experienced sailor, believed that the navy could exist with average but capable ships, with the gap between the force of a British and French frigate being made up by the superior training of British crews. He was of the opinion that the Perseverance-class frigates were of the perfect size for this strategy, with Inconstant being especially singled out as a model ship, and as such orders were put forth for the class to be revived. The smaller size and consistency in service of the Perseverance class was what gained it favour with St Vincent; it has been noted that other classes, such as the Flora class, were faster, and the choice was no compliment to the sailing qualities of the class. This would become the blueprint for future frigate designs and construction, forcing the Royal Navy back to the use of smaller, cheaper, but still capable frigates. While there was little push back against the order, it has since been suggested by the naval historian Robert Gardiner that the whole revival was a false economy that did not assist St Vincent's finances as he had hoped.

==== Design ====
The 1808 lines of Salsette, demonstrating the Bombay design of the second iteration

There were some very minor alterations to the original design of 1779, such as a reinforced forecastle, but the design was mostly identical. (Note: In 1794 the lines of one of the original Perseverance-class frigates, Inconstant, had been lengthened to increase speed and used to create a new class of frigates, the Phoebe class, but these changes were not included in the revival of the original class.) This included the sailing qualities of the class, which were not improved; they were comparatively poorer than other modern British frigates. This reflected the anachronistic twenty-year-old designs that made the Perseverance class shorter and stubbier than its compatriots. While their high gun ports provided the same benefits as the first iteration's, the ships of the class struggled to reach above eleven or twelve knots and did not catch the wind easily when at sea.

==== Construction and armament ====
Five vessels were initially ordered to be built in the United Kingdom, starting with the first ship of the revival, Tribune. The first two vessels were built in civilian dockyards as favours to the loyalties of the owners, but all other ships of the class were built in Royal Dockyards, reflecting St Vincent's distrust of most civilian dockyards. In the following year two more ships of the class were ordered, but these were to be built of teak in Bombay Dockyard by contract with the East India Company, and despite requests from the Admiralty for the builders to stay within the designated measurements for the class, these two ships ended up significantly different to the rest of the class, especially in terms of their beam. As such Gardiner argues that these should be considered as only half-sisters to the rest of the Perseverance class. In May 1808 the final ship of the original group of five ordered was completed, and a final frigate was ordered to be built to the same design. The naval historian Rif Winfield suggests that this ship, while completed and launched in 1811, was in fact a mistaken order.

The second iteration of the Perseverance class were constructed, apart from the two Bombay ships, to the following dimensions: 137 feet (41.8 m) along the gun deck, 113 feet 2 1/2 inches (34.5 m) at the keel, with a beam of 38 feet (11.6 m) and a depth in the hold of 13 feet 5 inches (4.1 m). They were to measure 869 50/94 tons burthen, and their crew complement was set slightly lower than the original iteration of the class; at 260, but by 1815 this had been raised to 264. The first Bombay ship, Salsette, was particularly unique when compared to her sister ships: she measured 137 feet (41.8 m) along the gun deck, 112 feet 11 inches (34.4 m) at the keel, with a beam of 38 feet 9 inches (11.8 m) and a depth in the hold of 13 feet 7 inches (4.1 m). She weighed 901 82/94 tons burthen.

While the ships themselves were very similar to their predecessors in the class, their armament was considerably heavier reflecting improvements in the years between the two iterations. While they still held thirty-six main guns of which twenty-six were 18-pounders, they had considerably less 9-pounders (only two each on the quarterdeck and forecastle) but made up for this with ten 32-pound carronades on the quarterdeck and another two on the forecastle. Furthermore, no swivel guns were included in their armament. As with the first iteration of the class, the classification of the ships would later on be changed to 42-gun frigates. While ships of the Perseverance class were used in a variety of different roles throughout their careers, all continued to be classified as fifth-rate frigates apart from Tribune, which was razeed as a 24-gun corvette in 1831.

== Ships ==
Ship name	Builder	Ordered	Laid down	Launched	Commissioned	Cost (Note: Cost includes initial construction and fittings when first commissioned.)	Fate	Ref.
Perseverance	John Randall & Co., Rotherhithe	3 December 1779	August 1780	10 April 1781	March 1781	£21,427.19.6d	Sold for breaking up 21 May 1823	
Phoenix	John Parsons, Bursledon	20 June 1781	August 1781	15 July 1783	October 1787	£18,367.1.5d	Wrecked and burned 2 March 1816	
Inconstant	William Barnard, Deptford Green	8 December 1781	December 1782	28 October 1783	August 1790	£22,853.0.1d	Broken up November 1817	
Leda	John Randall & Co., Rotherhithe	22 March 1782	January 1783	12 September 1783	November 1790	£16,949.8.10d	Lost in a storm 11 December 1795	
Tribune	George Parsons, Bursledon	6 May 1801	July 1801	5 July 1803	July 1803	Unknown	Wrecked 29 November 1839	
Shannon	Josiah & Thomas Brindley, Frindsbury	8 July 1801	August 1801	2 September 1803	July 1803	Unknown	Wrecked and burned 16 December 1803	
Meleager	Robert Seppings, Chatham Dockyard	9 July 1801	June 1804	25 November 1806	November 1806	Unknown	Wrecked 30 July 1808	
Iphigenia	Robert Seppings, Chatham Dockyard	9 July 1801	February 1806 (Note: Order was cancelled on 26 July 1805 but reinstated on 20 January 1806.)	26 April 1808	May 1808	£26,150	Broken up May 1851	
Lowestoft	Woolwich Dockyard	9 July 1801	—N/a				Cancelled 26 July 1805	
Salsette	Bombay Dockyard	12 May 1802	19 July 1803	17 January 1805	1805	£27,922	Broken up 20 March 1874	
Doris	Bombay Dockyard	5 June 1803	25 April 1806	24 March 1807	1808	£39,774	Sold April 1829	
Orlando	Robert Seppings, Chatham Dockyard	2 May 1808	March 1809	20 June 1811	June 1811	Unknown	Sold March 1824	

=== First iteration ===
==== Perseverance ====
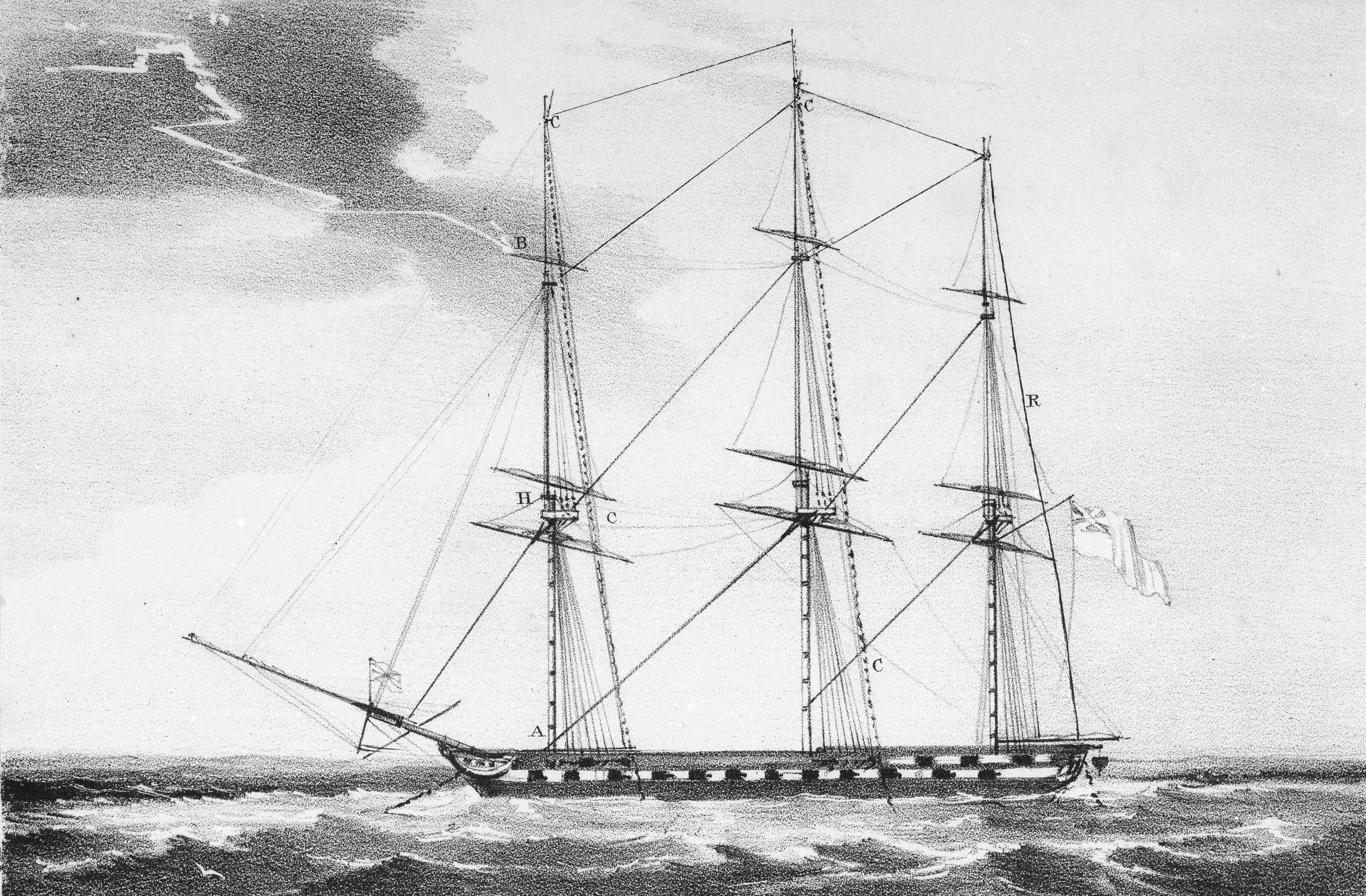
Perseverance in 1781

Perseverance was commissioned by Captain Skeffington Lutwidge in March 1781. On 20 July she sailed to the North America Station and en-route she captured the French 26-gun post ship Lively in the English Channel on 29 July. She arrived there on 24 September and began an active period of service, capturing the American privateer General Green on 30 August, and in the following year Raven on 1 April and Diana on 29 August. She left the North America Station in 1783 and was paid off in September of the same year. She was recommissioned in October 1787 by Captain William Young but was quickly paid off again in December. Perseverance then received a refit at the end of 1788 before being recommissioned again in October under Captain Isaac Smith. On 11 February 1789 Smith sailed her to the East Indies Station, where on 18 November 1791 the frigate was present at but did not actively participate in the battle of Tellicherry. Perseverance served in the East Indies until paying off on 9 July 1793. From then on she was placed in ordinary at Portsmouth, becoming a receiving ship in January 1800. She served in this role until 1822 and was sold for breaking up to Joshua Cristall on 21 May 1823, for £2,530.

==== Phoenix ====
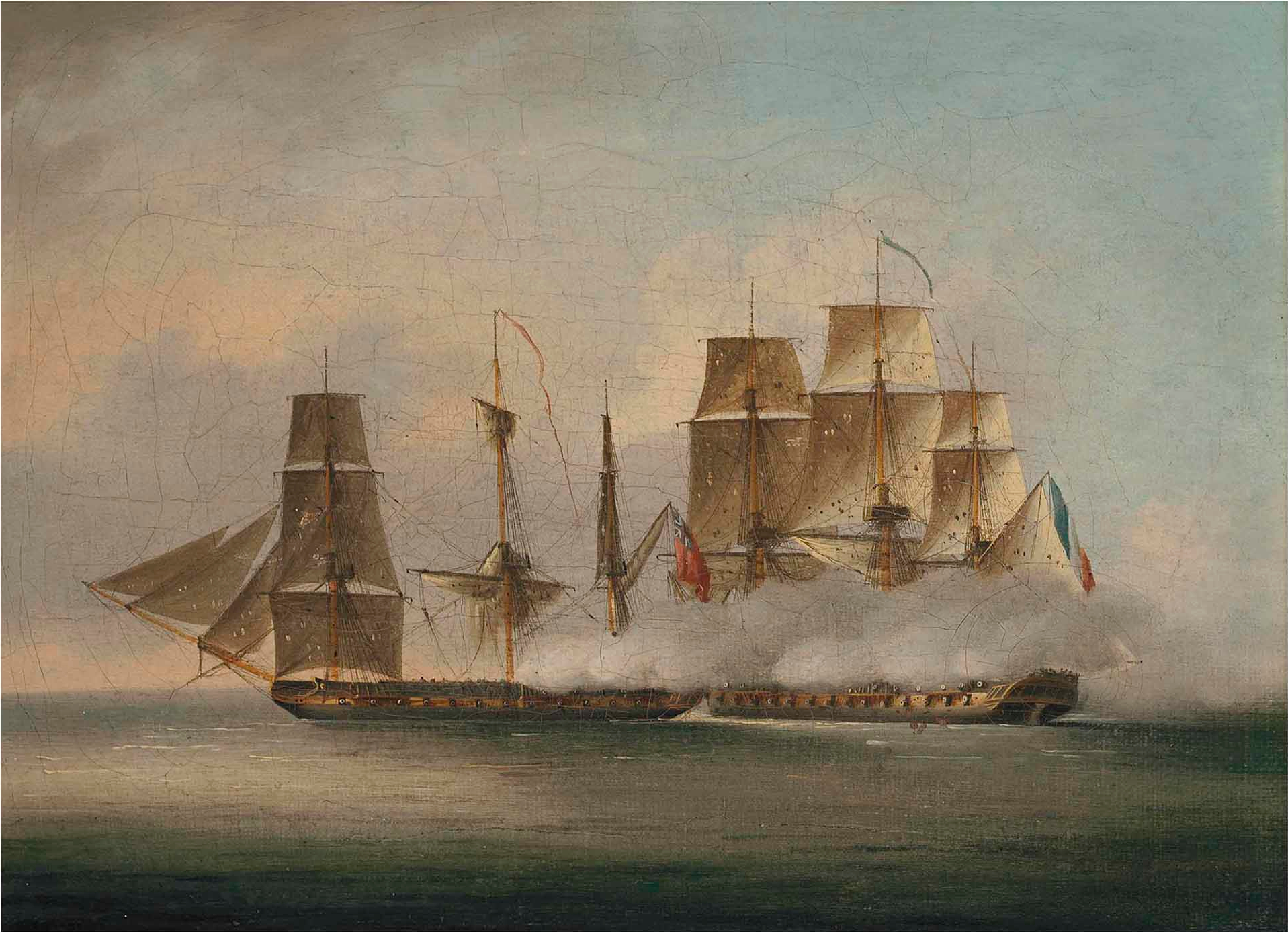
Phoenix (left) in the action of 10 August 1805

Phoenix was commissioned by Captain John Willett Payne in October 1787, but paid off in the following December without having gone to sea. She was then fitted out for sea service, which work was completed on 11 December 1788. While this was being completed Phoenix had been recommissioned by Captain George A. Byron in October. Under him she sailed to the East Indies Station, and on 18 November 1791 she fought and captured the French 32-gun frigate Résolue in the battle of Tellicherry, despite the two nations not being at war. Phoenix returned home to England in August 1793 and was put in for a large series of repairs at Deptford Dockyard. These took place between August 1794 and January 1796, with her having been recommissioned under Captain Lawrence Halstead in the previous October. She then sailed to serve in the North Sea Fleet, where she captured the Batavian 36-gun frigate Argo in the action of 12 May 1796.

In March 1797 Phoenix was transferred to the Channel Fleet; she captured the French 4-gun privateer L'Espiegle off Waterford on 18 May, 1-gun Le Brave off Cape Clear Island on 24 April 1798, 20-gun La Caroline on 31 May, and 20-gun Foudroyant on 23 January 1799. Phoenix then sailed to join the Mediterranean Fleet on 6 May, where she continued her successes. Alongside the fireship HMS Incendiary she captured the French 10-gun privateer L'Eole off Cape Spartel on 11 February 1800. Phoenix then took the French 12-gun brig L'Albanaise on 3 June while in company with the brig-sloop HMS Port Mahon. Fourteen days later she captured the French 4-gun ship Revanche, but the prize capsized the following day.

On 2 September 1801 Phoenix, with the frigates HMS Pomone and HMS Minerva, captured the French 32-gun frigate Success and destroyed the 36-gun frigate La Bravoure off Leghorn. Phoenix was paid off in June 1802 and received a refit between July 1802 and June 1803. She was recommissioned in April of the latter year by Captain Thomas Baker, under whom she captured the French 40-gun frigate Didon in the action of 10 August 1805. Phoenix then fought at the battle of Cape Ortegal on 4 November. Baker was replaced by Captain Zachary Mudge in December, and Phoenix began serving again in the Channel Fleet. She received a repair at Plymouth Dockyard between September 1808 and April 1809, having been both paid off and recommissioned in February 1809. Phoenix then captured the French 14-gun privateer Le Charles alongside the ship-sloop HMS Jalouse on 29 January 1810, with Mudge then being replaced by Captain James Bowen who sailed the frigate to the East Indies Station on 11 May.

Captain William Webley took over from Bowen in 1813, and he in turn handed over to Captain Charles Austen in September 1814. Austen sailed Phoenix to the Mediterranean, where she was wrecked off İzmir in a hurricane on 20 February 1816. The wreck was burned on 2 March, with the remaining materials sold for $600.

==== Inconstant ====
Inconstant was first commissioned in August 1790 by Captain George Wilson, but was paid off with the end of the Spanish Armament in September 1791. She then received a refit at Woolwich Dockyard between January and February 1793, and was recommissioned under Captain Augustus Montgomery to join Admiral Lord Howe's Channel Fleet. In April Inconstant was sent to the West Indies Station, where she captured the French 14-gun ship Le Curieux on 3 June. The frigate was then sent home in July, joining the Mediterranean Fleet on 21 November. As such she was present at the siege of Toulon. In the following year Captain George Cockburn assumed temporary command of Inconstant, before being replaced by Captain Thomas Fremantle in January 1795. In a prelude to the battle of Genoa the frigate then skirmished with the French 80-gun ship of the line Ça Ira off Genoa on 10 March. She recaptured the 14-gun brig HMS Speedy fifteen days later, before joining a squadron under the command of Captain Horatio Nelson in August.

Inconstant captured the French 24-gun corvette Unité at Bona on 20 April 1796, and then assisted with the evacuation of Leghorn on 26 June. She was paid off in September of the following year, and was fitted as a 20-gun troopship at Woolwich between March and June 1798. Recommissioned in April by Commander Milham Ponsonby, Inconstant was paid off again in October 1799. She received another refit at Woolwich between October 1799 and March 1800, having also been re-armed with sixteen 9-pounders and four 6-pounders. Under Commander John Ayscough Inconstant initially served in the North Sea, before moving to participate in French Royalist operations in Quiberon Bay in June 1800. The ship then supported the British Egypt campaign in 1801, before coming under the command of Captain Richard Byron in October 1802. Byron was replaced by Captain Edward Dickson in December, under whom Inconstant recaptured Gorée on 7 March 1804.

Inconstant was refitted as a frigate again at Portsmouth between December 1805 and February 1806, still under Dickson. Between 1806 and 1808 she served as the flagship to Vice-Admiral Sir James Saumarez in the Channel Islands, before being refitted again at Portsmouth between September 1808 and October 1809. In this Inconstant's quarterdeck armament was changed to twelve 32-pounder carronades. She sailed to the Cape of Good Hope Station on 27 December and was paid off in 1810. Having been refitted again at Portsmouth between September and December of that year, Inconstant was recommissioned in October by Captain John Quilliam to serve in the North Sea. Captain Edward Owen replaced Quilliam in December, commanding the ship until some time in 1812. Captain Sir Edward Tucker took command of Inconstant in March 1814 and sailed her to South America. Captain Sir James Yeo took command in August 1815, and the ship was broken up at Portsmouth in November 1817.

==== Leda ====
Leda was commissioned in around November 1790 by Captain Thomas Bertie for the Spanish Armament. She then received a great repair at Blackwall Yard between June of that year and December 1791, then moving to continue work at Deptford. There she was refitted between December 1792 and 24 February 1793, being recommissioned under Captain George Campbell in January. Leda sailed to the Mediterranean on 7 April, where she captured the French 22-gun ship L'Eclair on 9 June and served at the siege of Toulon. Captain John Woodley replaced Campbell in May 1794, some time after which the ship was ordered to sail to Martinique with a convoy. While off Madeira on 11 December 1795, two of Leda's guns came loose in a storm and broke through the side of the ship, through which water began to enter. Lega capsized in ten minutes with the loss of all but seven of her crew.

=== Second iteration ===
==== Tribune ====
Tribune was commissioned in July 1803 under the command of Captain George Henry Towry, who was replaced by Captain Richard Bennet in early 1804. Under the latter captain, on 30 January the frigate captured the French gunbrigs No.43 and No.47. Captain Richard Curry assumed temporary command of Tribune in May 1805, with Captain Thomas Baker taking over in 1806. Tribune was one of the vessels that chased the French 74-gun ship of the line Vétéran into the Baie de La Forêt on 26 August 1806. In 1808 Captain George Reynolds replaced Baker, taking Tribune to serve in the Baltic Sea. Off Mandal she fought an action against four Danish brigs on 12 May 1810, before being reassigned to the East Indies Station to which she sailed on 5 March 1811. Some time after this the vessel returned to England, where she was repaired at Woolwich between January 1814 and June 1815 before being put in ordinary at Chatham Dockyard.

Tribune was recommissioned by Captain Nesbit Willoughby in August 1818, and the ship received a refit for foreign service between October 1818 and December 1819. Tribune then joined the Leeward Islands Station before being paid off again in September 1822. She was under repair until March 1823, at which point she sailed under Captain Gardiner Guion to serve on the Lisbon Station. There the frigate stayed for around a year before receiving a repair at Chatham between July 1826 and May 1828, being recommissioned by Captain John Wilson in January of the latter year. Tribune sailed for the South America Station, where in December 1829 Wilson was replaced by Captain John Duntze. Tribune returned from South America to be cut down into a 24-gun sixth rate corvette at Chatham between January 1832 and March 1833. She was then refitted between May and September 1834, having been commissioned in May by Captain James Tompkinson, for the Mediterranean. In 1838 Tompkinson handed over to Captain Charles Williams, under whom Tribune was wrecked near Tarragona on 29 November 1839. (Note: Winfield's 1817–1863 edition of British Warships in the Age of Sail records the date as 28 November.)

==== Shannon ====
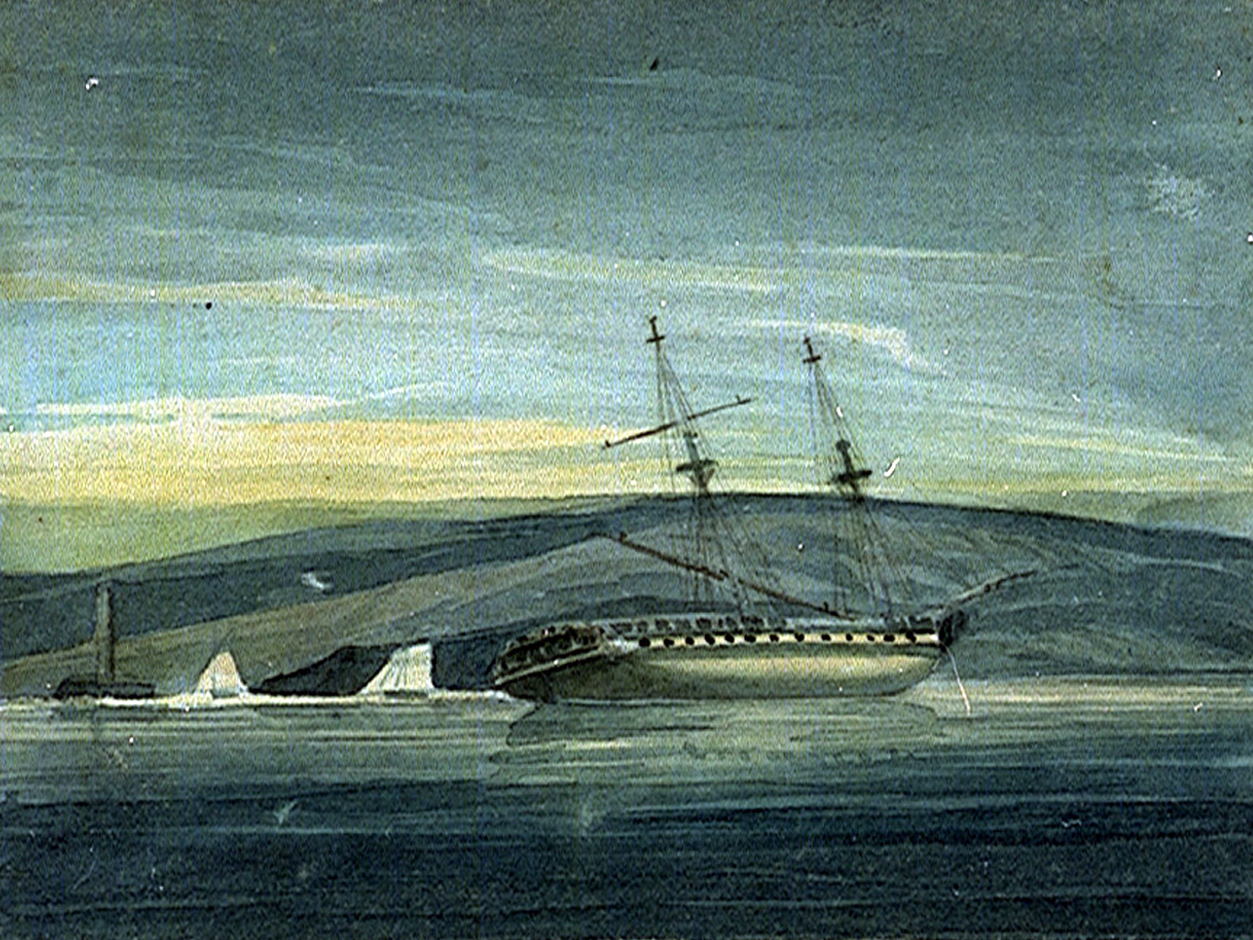
Shannon grounded in 1803

Shannon was originally ordered under the name Pallas, but was renamed in November 1802 and commissioned in July 1803 by Captain Edward Leveson-Gower. The frigate was sent to serve on the blockade of Le Havre. While doing so she was driven onto rocks underneath the gun batteries of La Hogue in a storm on 10 December, where she was captured by French soldiers with the loss of three crewmen. The wreck was burned by the sloop HMS Merlin on 16 December.

==== Meleager ====
Meleager was commissioned in November 1806 under the command of Captain John Broughton, initially to cruise in the North Sea. On 16 November 1807 the frigate sailed to the West Indies Station as escort to a convoy. Having arrived, Meleager cut out the French 1-gun privateer Renard from Santiago de Cuba on 8 February 1808, and then captured the Spanish 5-gun privateer Antelope on 19 February. Broughton handed over to Captain Frederick Warren in April. Meleager was wrecked on Bare Bush Key (Note: Also written as Barebush Cay.) off Jamaica on 30 July, with three men drowned.

==== Iphigenia ====
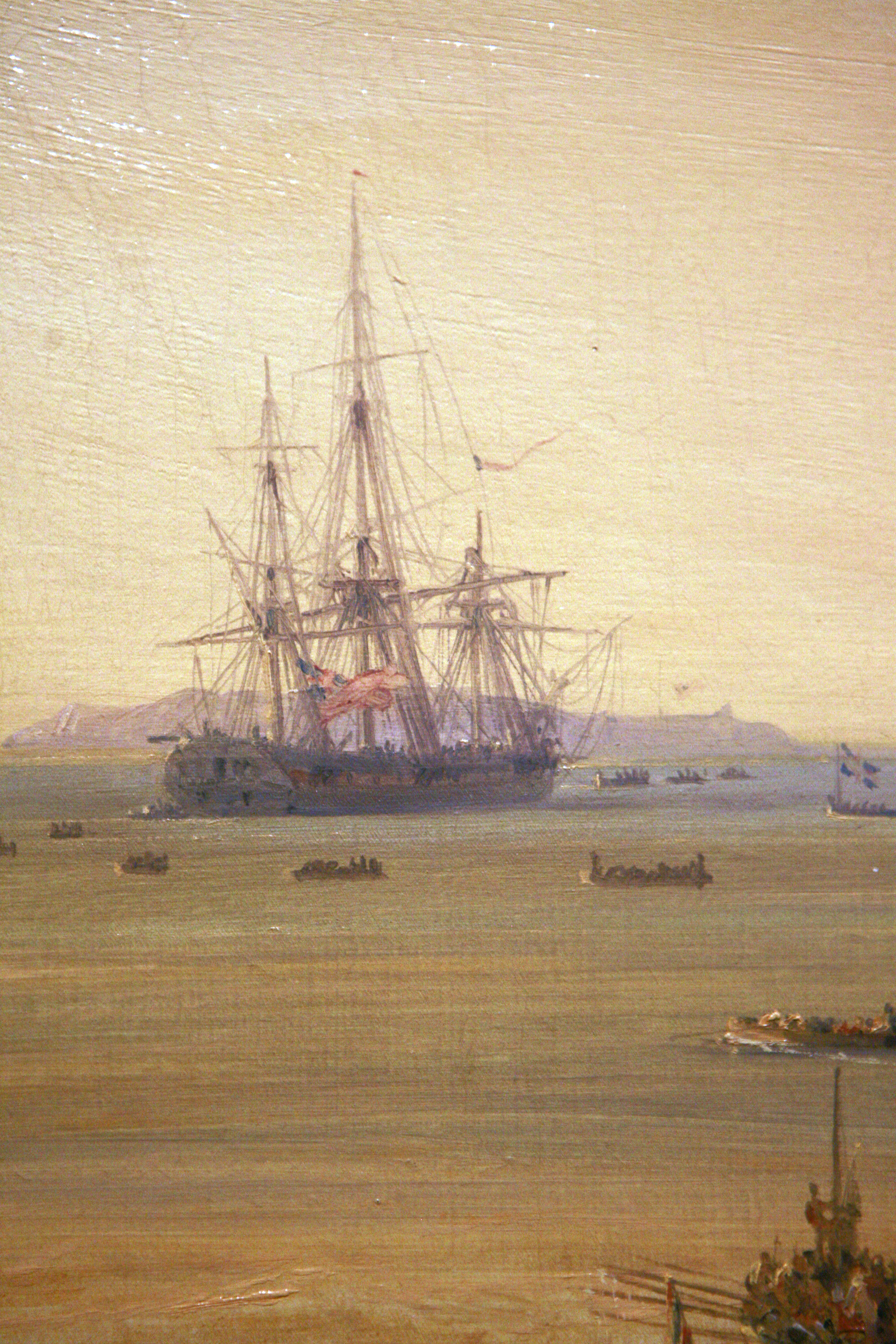
Iphigenia at the battle of Grand Port

Construction of Iphigenia was cancelled on 26 July 1805, but reinstated on 20 January 1806. The ship was commissioned in May 1808 by Captain Henry Lambert, under whom Iphigenia sailed to the Cape of Good Hope Station on 28 January 1809. As such she participated in the successful invasion of Île Bonaparte on 8 July 1810, but was subsequently captured by the French at the battle of Grand Port on 28 August. The French took Iphigenia into service as Iphigénie, and on 6 December she was recaptured by the British at the invasion of Isle de France. Captain Thomas Caulfield was given command of Iphigenia to sail her home, and the ship was paid off in April 1811. She received a refit at Portsmouth between November 1811 and February 1812, and was recommissioned in January of the latter year by Captain Lucius Curtis.

Iphigenia with a convoy to the East Indies Station on 25 March 1812. While there command of the frigate changed to Captain Fleetwood Pellew, who took Iphigenia to serve in the Mediterranean on 6 December. In February of the following year Captain Andrew King replace Pellew, with the ship continuing in the Mediterranean. Having returned to England, Iphigenia received a series of repairs at Plymouth between June and September 1815. She returned to the East Indies a month later, with Captain John Tancock assuming command some time after, sailing to the Mediterranean in May 1816. Iphigenia received another repair at Plymouth between January and June 1818, coming under the command of Captain Hyde Parker in March. Parker sailed the frigate to Jamaica.

Having returned to England Iphigenia was recommissioned under Captain Sir Robert Mends in June 1821, under whom she joined the Africa Station. The ship was retired from service in 1832, being converted into a training ship between December of that year and July 1833. She was used as such by the Marine Society until 1848, and was broken up at Deptford in April 1851.

==== Lowestoft ====
Lowestoft was cancelled on 26 July 1805 before being laid down.

==== Salsette ====
Salsette was originally named Pitt; she was the first Royal Navy vessel to be constructed from teak. Commissioned at Bombay in 1805 by Captain Walter Bathurst, the frigate joined the East Indies Station. Between 1805 and 1806 she participated in the blockade of Mauritius, with Captain James Giles Vashon succeeding Bathurst in the latter year. In February 1807 Vashon was replaced by Captain George Waldegrave, and on 19 February the ship's name was changed to Salsette. The frigate then returned to England for a refit at Portsmouth. This took place between January and 17 March 1808, after which Salsette sailed to serve in the Finnish War, again under the command of Bathurst. She stayed in the Baltic until 1809. In 1810 Commander Henry Montresor took command, some time later in the year handing over to Commander William Bertie. Bertie was drowned in December, with Commander John Hollingworth replacing him. In 1811 Hollingworth was in turn replaced by Captain Henry Hope, who captured the French 2-gun privateer La Comete in the Mediterranean on 21 April 1812, and the French 16-gun privateer Le Mercure off the Isle of Wight on 14 October of the same year.

In December Captain John Bowen assumed command, sailing Salsette to the East Indies Station on 25 March 1813. Captain Joseph Drury succeeded Bowen in 1815, and in June 1816 the ship was laid up at Portsmouth. Salsette was housed over in November 1823 but remained in the navy list. She was turned into a lazarette in July 1831 for service at Hull, and then in October 1835 became a receiving ship at Woolwich. The ship moved to Sheerness Dockyard on 7 September 1869, and was later broken up at Chatham on 20 March 1874.

==== Doris ====
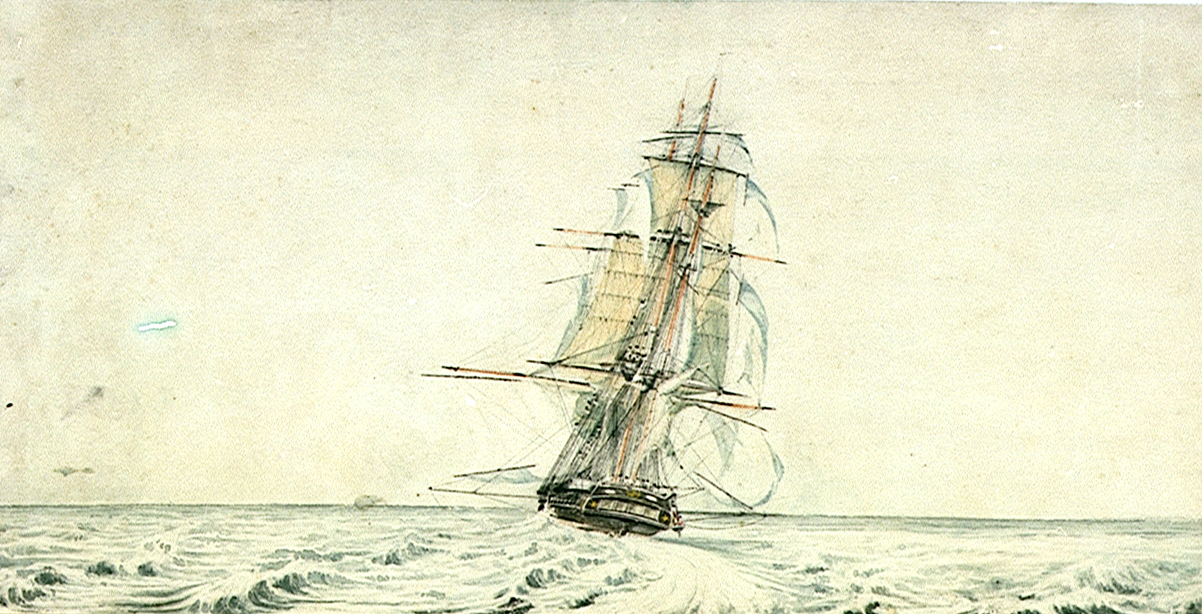
Doris rounding to, to pick up a man overboard in 1828

Doris was originally named Salsette while under construction, but was later renamed Pitt. The ship was finally named Doris on 26 August 1807 after the Royal Navy accepted her. She was commissioned at Bombay in 1808 by Captain Christopher Cole, joining the East Indies Station. In 1810 Cole was replaced by Captain William Lye, and the ship participated in the invasion of Isle de France in December of that year. Continuing on station, she was also present at the capture of Java in September 1811. In the following year Doris came under the command of Commander John Harper to sail home. She arrived at Plymouth on 8 November and between December 1812 and March 1813 was refitted. Recommissioned in January of the latter year under Captain Robert O'Brien, the ship sailed to the China Station on 25 March. O'Brien left the ship in 1815 and in the following year was replaced by Captain John Allen.

By 1817 Doris had returned to England, where she received a repair at Sheerness between October 1817 and April 1818. She was fitted for sea between March and June 1821, having been recommissioned in March by Captain Thomas Graham. The frigate joined the South America Station, where Graham died in April 1822. He was replaced by Captain Frederick Vernon, who in turn handed over to Captain William Hope Johnstone in 1824. Doris was paid off in January 1825, but recommissioned a month later under Captain Sir John Sinclair. Sinclair commanded the frigate until 1829, when in April she was sold at Valparaíso for $5,590 because of her poor condition.

==== Orlando ====
Orlando was commissioned in June 1811 by Captain John Clavell, who sailed her to the Mediterranean on 20 November. Clavell was temporarily replaced in command by Commander Charles Orlando Bridgeman in 1815, and the ship was fitted out for foreign service at Deptford between June and September of that year. Clavell then returned to Orlando, with the frigate joining the East Indies Station. She was paid off at Trincomalee in 1818, where she was fitted as a hospital ship towards the end of 1819. Orlando was sold at Trincomalee in March 1824 for 7,000 rupees.
