= HMS Perseverance (1781) =

Frigate of the Royal Navy

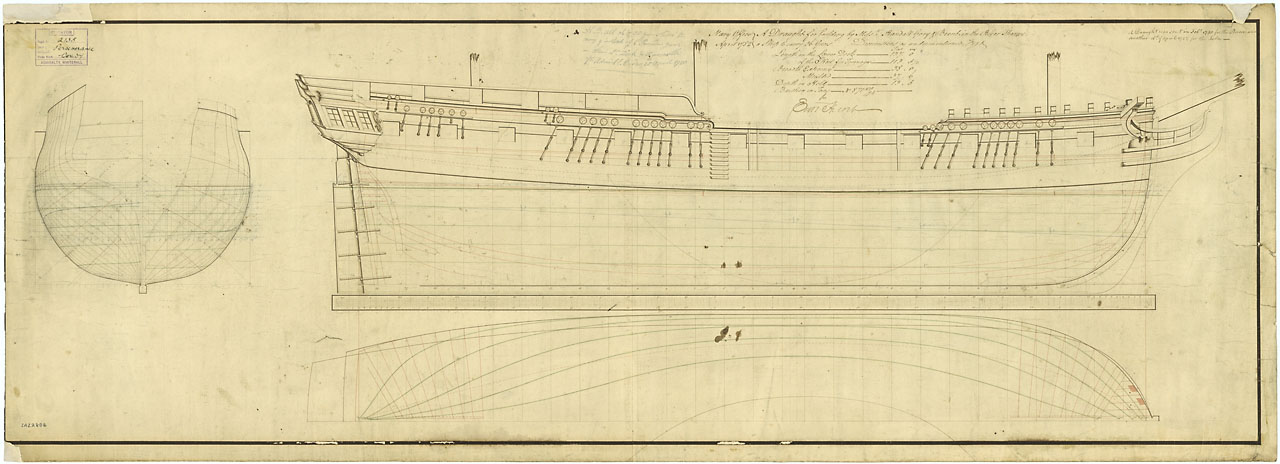
- Perseverance

History

Great Britain
- Name: HMS Perseverance
- Ordered: 3 December 1779
- Builder: John Randall & Co
- Cost: £11,544.15.2d
- Laid down: August 1780
- Launched: 10 April 1781
- Completed: 3 June 1781

General characteristics
- Class & type: Perseverance
- Type: Fifth-rate frigate
- Tons burthen: 871 42/94 (bm)
- Length: 137 ft 0 in (41.76 m) (gundeck); 113 ft 4.25 in (34.5504 m) (keel)
- Beam: 38 ft 0 in (11.58 m)
- Depth of hold: 13 ft 5 in (4.09 m)
- Propulsion: Sails
- Armament: 36 guns

HMS Perseverance was a 36-gun Perseverance-class frigate of the Royal Navy. She served on the North American station until 1787, after which she returned to England, where she was refitted at Portsmouth. In 1789 Perseverance was sent to the East Indies; she returned to Portsmouth in 1793, when she was laid up before finishing her career there as a receiving ship. She was sold and broken up in May 1823.

== Background ==
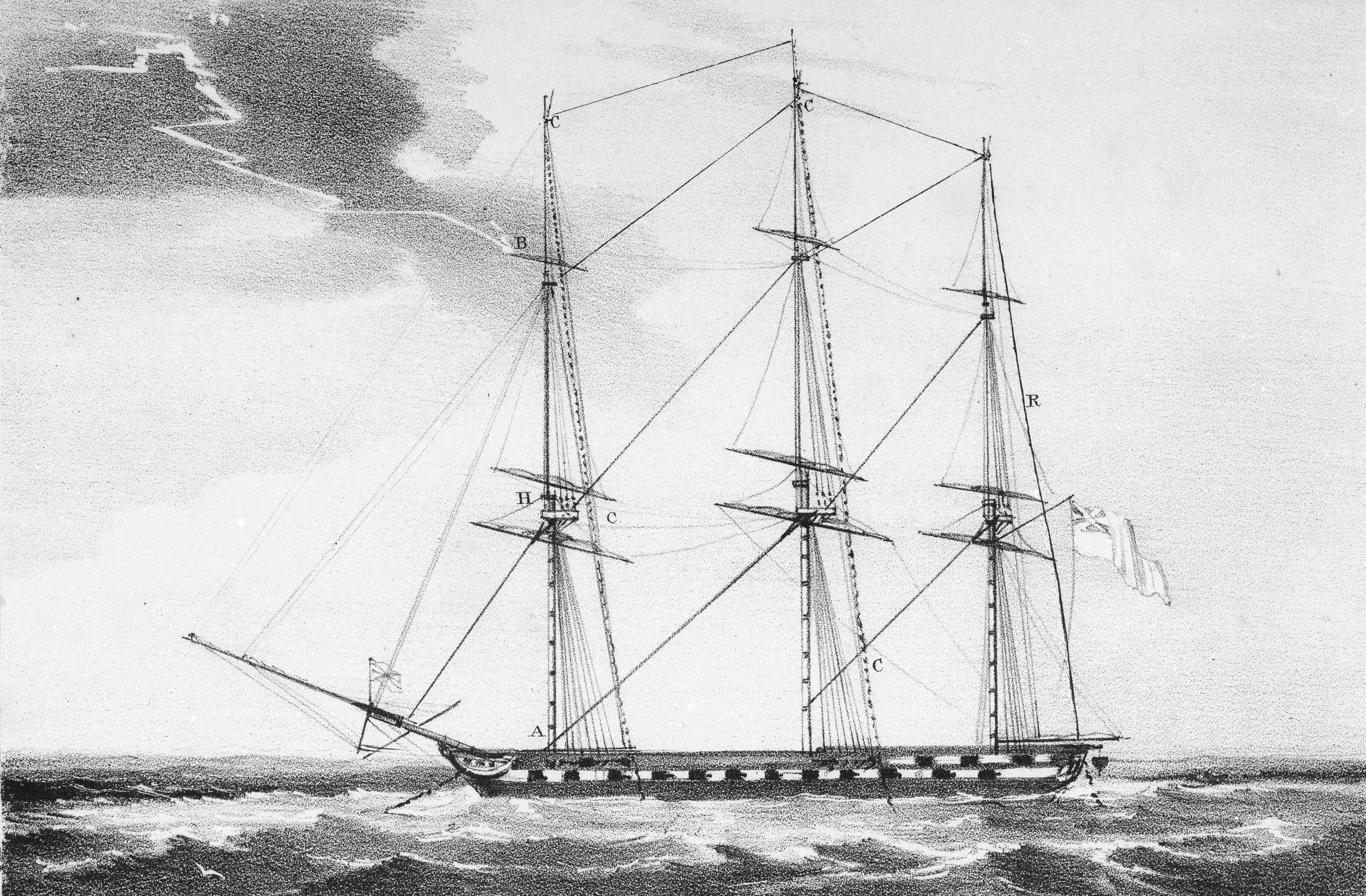
1781 depiction of Perseverance

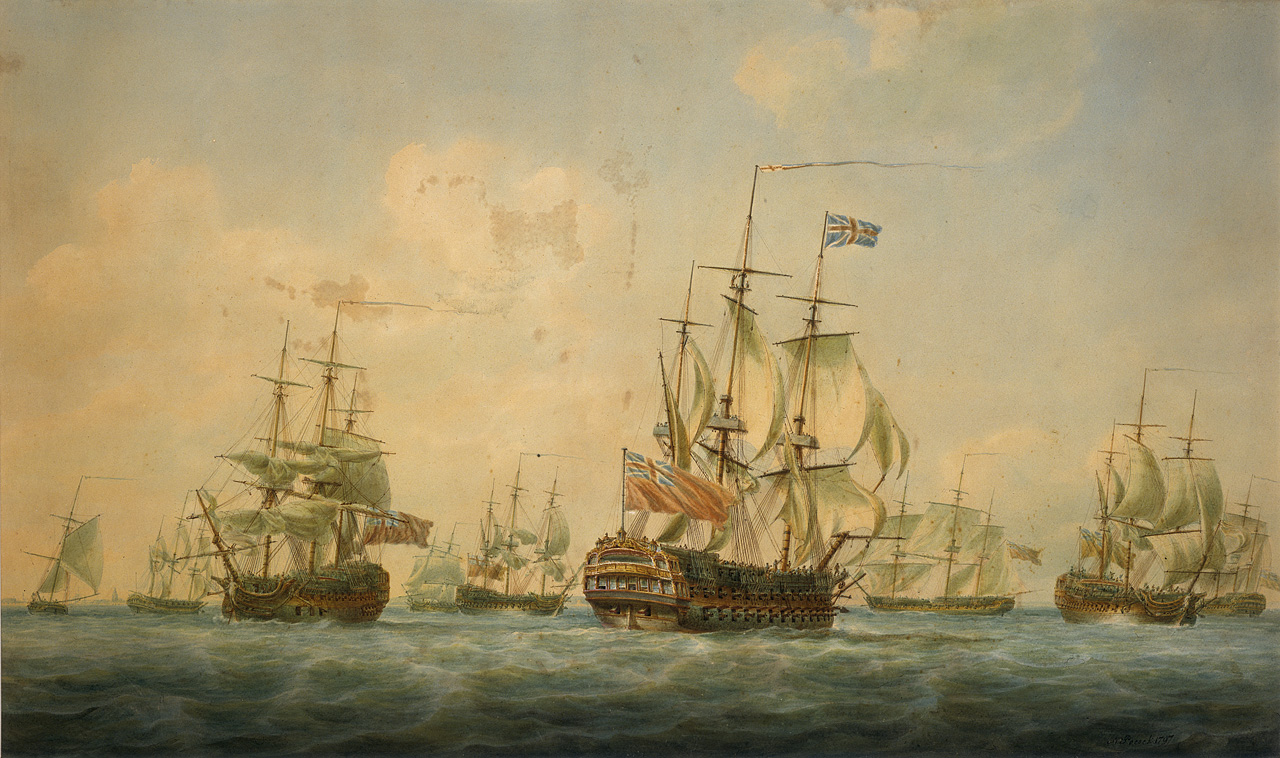
Perseverance (third from right) off Spithead in a 1797 Nicholas Pocock painting

Britain's early preference for smaller warships was dictated by its need to maintain a large navy at a reasonable cost. By the latter half of the 1770s, however, Britain was facing a war with France, Spain and the United States of America, and found herself in need of a more powerful type of frigate.

In 1778, the Navy Board ordered the first of two new types of frigate, the 38-gun Minerva-class, designed by Edward Hunt, and the 36-gun Flora-class, designed by John Williams. Both had a main battery of 18-pounder guns. Shortly after, in 1779, Hunt was asked to design a 36-gun frigate as a comparison to William's Flora-class. The result was the Perseverance class and HMS Perseverance, was the first of these fifth rates, ordered for the Royal Navy on 3 December 1779. It was followed by Phoenix in June 1781, Inconstant in December and Leda in March 1782.

== Construction ==
Perseverance was built at Rotherhithe by John Randall and Co and was 137 ft 0 in (41.76 m) along the gun deck, 113 ft 4.25 in (34.5504 m) at the keel, and had a beam of 38 ft 0 in (11.58 m). With a depth in the hold of 13 ft 5 in (4.09 m), she was 871 42/94 (bm). The keel was laid down in August 1780, and she was launched in April the following year, when she was taken to Deptford to be fitted out and sheathed in copper. Her initial build cost £11,544.15.2d, at the time, plus a further £9,743.1.11d for fitting.

Designed to take a complement of 260 men, her armament consisted of a 26-gun main battery of 18-pounders with eight 9-pound guns and four 18-pound carronades on the quarterdeck. The fo'c'sle carried two 9-pounders, four 18-pound carronades and fourteen 1/2-pound swivel guns. The swivels and carronades were not part of Hunt's design and were added to it a couple of months before the ship was ordered. Hunt also intended 6-pound guns for the quarterdeck and fo'c'sle, but these were upgraded to 9-pounders in April 1780.

== Career ==
Perseverance was first commissioned in March 1781 under Skeffington Lutwidge who had recently arrived in Britain with American prisoners of war. Lutwidge returned to the North American station with Perseverance, re-capturing the 20-gun HMS Lively on 29 July during his voyage across the Atlantic. Over the following two years Perseverance captured a number of American privateers including the General Green on 30 August 1781, the Raven on 1 April 1782 and the Diana on 29 August 1782. She also captured the French naval cutter Alerte, under Gallien de Chabons, on 28 November 1781. Perseverance was paid off in September 1783. She was briefly recommissioned in November 1787, serving less than two months under William Young. In December she was taken to Portsmouth, where she spent the next 12 months undergoing a refit at a cost of £2,096. Issac Smith took command in October and in February 1787 took her to the East Indies, where she later took part in the Battle of Tellicherry. Francis Austen, brother of Jane, served as a midshipman aboard the Perseverance between 1787 and 1789.

In November 1791, Perseverance was anchored under the guns of the Tellicherry Fort with the 38-gun Minerva and the 36-gun Phoenix, while the East India Company was carrying out operations against Tipoo Sahib. The British suspected that the French were aiding the Sultan and had positioned a squadron between Mangalore and Mahé to intercept shipping and search it for contraband of war. When the French frigate, Résolue, was spotted in the company of two merchant vessels, Perseverance and Phoenix were sent to investigate. Résolue refused to heave to and began firing at the British frigates which responded in kind and after about twenty minutes, Résolue was forced to strike. Having searched the Résolue and found everything to be above board, the British would have returned to their ships and left, but the French captain refused to continue in his vessel and insisted on it being treated as a prize of war. Britain was not at war with France, however, so the merchant vessels were allowed to continue, and the British towed Résolue to Mahé, where she was left at anchor with her topmasts struck. The French commodore at Mahé was furious and complained bitterly, both to the British commodore, William Cornwallis, and his own superiors in Paris. The altercation could well have escalated into a diplomatic row but with France in the throes of a revolution, the incident was not taken much notice of.

== Fate ==
Perseverance was paid off after the conclusion of the war in September 1793 and was laid up in ordinary at Portsmouth. Serving as a receiving ship between 1800 and 1822. She was sold for £2,530 and broken up on 21 May 1823.
