= Battle of Tellicherry =

Battle of the Third Anglo-Mysore War

- Part of the Third Anglo-Mysore War
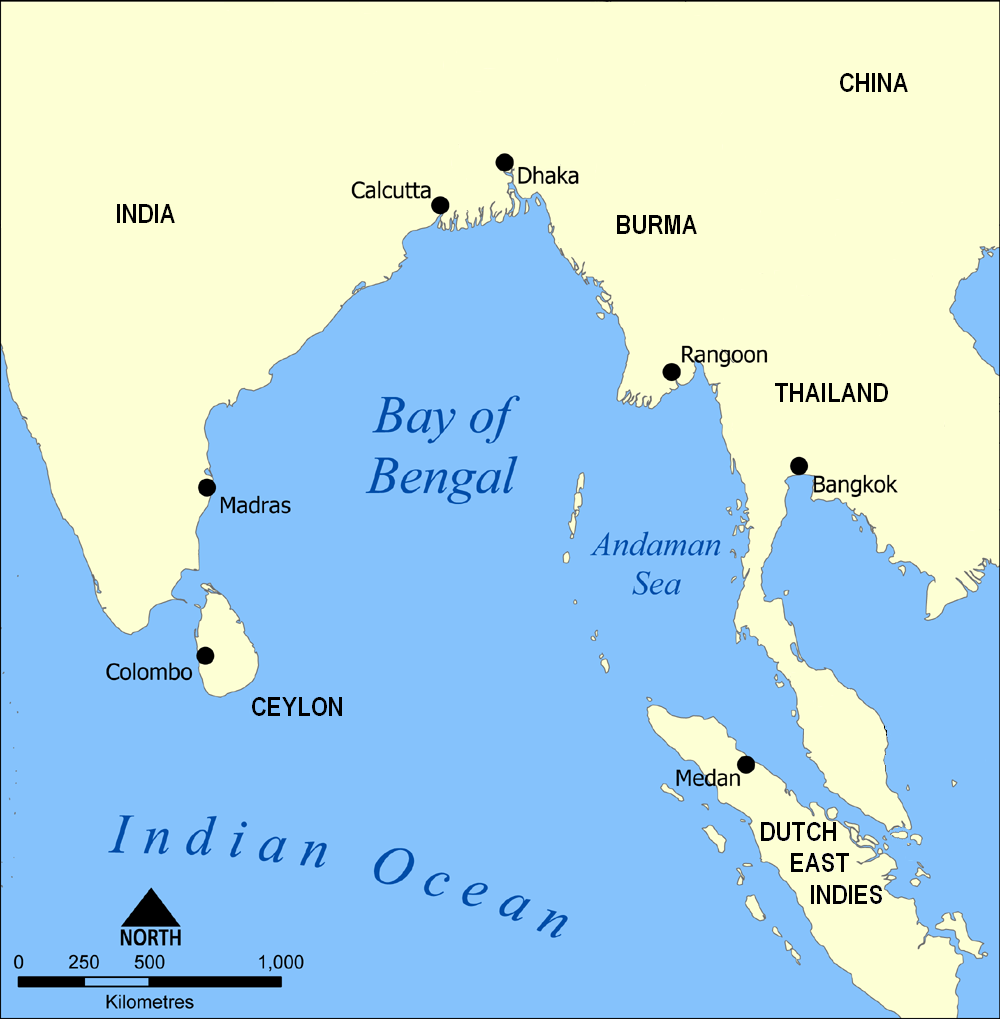
- Location of the capture of Résolue
| Date | 18 November 1791 |
| Location | Off Tellicherry, India |
| Result | British victory |

Belligerents
| Great Britain | France |

Commanders and leaders
| Richard Strachan | Unknown |

Strength
| 2 frigates | 1 frigate |

Casualties and losses
| 6 killed 11 wounded | 25 killed 60 wounded 1 frigate captured |

The Battle of Tellicherry was a naval action fought off the Indian port of Tellicherry between British and French warships on 18 November 1791 during the Third Anglo-Mysore War. Britain and France were not at war at the time of the engagement, but French support for the Kingdom of Mysore in the conflict with the British East India Company had led to Royal Navy patrols stopping and searching French ships sailing for the Mysorean port of Mangalore. When a French convoy from Mahé passed the British port of Tellicherry in November 1791, Commodore William Cornwallis sent a small squadron to intercept the French ships.

As the British force under Captain Sir Richard Strachan approached the convoy, the escorting frigate Résolue opened fire. A general action followed, with Strachan succeeding in forcing the French ship to surrender within twenty minutes and both sides suffering damage and casualties. All of the French vessels were searched and subsequently returned to Mahé, the local French authorities reacting furiously at what they perceived as a violation of their neutral position. Messages were sent from Commodore Saint-Félix back to France reporting the action but they evoked little response. Although under normal circumstances the battle might have provoked a diplomatic incident, the upheavals of the ongoing French Revolution meant that the despatches had little effect.

== Background ==
In December 1789, after five years of diplomatic wrangling about the terms of the Treaty of Mangalore that had ended the Second Anglo-Mysore War, Tipu Sultan, the ruler of Mysore, again declared war on the British East India Company and their allies in Southern India. For the next two years the war continued as British forces and their allies drove the Mysore armies back towards the capital of Seringapatam. Both sides were reliant on supply by sea to maintain their campaigns inland: the British forces were supported from their major ports at Bombay and Madras, later stationing additional forces at the small port of Tellicherry inside Mysore territory. The Mysorean forces were supplied through Mangalore by French ships. France had been an ally of the Tipu Sultan's father Hyder Ali during the Second Anglo-Mysore War and although the political instability caused by the French Revolution in Europe prevented active involvement, they ensured that their ships kept up a supply of equipment to Mysore throughout the war.

In an effort to eliminate French support Commodore William Cornwallis, the British naval commander in the region, stationed a squadron of frigates at Tellicherry, where they were ideally situated to blockade Mangalore and prevent the passage of shipping into Mysorean territory. The squadron consisted of Cornwallis in HMS Minerva, Captain Sir Richard Strachan in HMS Phoenix and HMS Perseverance under Captain Isaac Smith. The French operated a squadron of their own on the coast, led by Commodore Saint-Félix and consisting of two frigates based at Mahé, a small French port 7 miles (11 km) south of Tellicherry. The French had communicated to the British at Tellicherry that they would not submit to any attempts to search their vessels, but Strachan and Cornwallis replied that they would enforce the blockade of Mangalore whatever the consequences.

== Battle ==
In November 1791, a French convoy sailed from Mahé on the short journey to Mangalore. The convoy included two merchant vessels and the frigate Résolue, a 36-gun warship under Captain Callamand. Passing northwards, the convoy soon passed Tellicherry and Cornwallis sent Strachan with Phoenix and Perseverance to stop and inspect the French ships to ensure they were not carrying military supplies. As Smith halted the merchant ships and sent boats to inspect them, Strachan did the same to Résolue, hailing the French captain and placing an officer in a small boat to board the frigate. The French captain was outraged at this violation of his neutrality, and responded by opening fire: British sources suggest that his initial target was the small boat, although Phoenix was the ship most immediately damaged.

Strachan was unsurprised at the French reaction, and returned fire immediately, the proximity of the ships preventing any manoeuvres. Within twenty minutes the combat was decided, the French captain hauling down his colours with his ship battered and more than 60 men wounded or dead. The French ship carried significantly weaker cannon than Phoenix, with 6- and 12-pounder guns to the 9- and 18-pounders aboard the British squadron. In addition, Résolue was heavily outnumbered: no other French warships were in the area, while the British had three large frigates within sight. French losses eventually totalled 25 men killed and 60 wounded, Strachan suffering just six killed and 11 wounded in return.

== Aftermath ==
With the enemy subdued, Strachan ordered a thorough search of the captured vessels, but could find no contraband and returned control to the French commander. The French officer however refused, insisting that he and his ship were treated as prisoners of war. Cornwallis ordered the merchant ships released to continue their journey and for the frigate to be towed back to Mahé, where it was anchored in the roads with its sails and topmasts struck. Provision was subsequently made at Mahé by Strachan for the wounded French sailors. Soon afterwards Saint-Félix arrived at Mahé in his frigate Cybèle and reacted furiously at the discovery that one of his neutral ships had been attacked and captured by the British. When Cornwallis insisted that his ships had been acting within their orders, Saint-Félix promised reprisals if any of his vessels were attacked again and withdrew with both Cybèle and Résolue later in the day, followed by Minerva and Phoenix. One account reported that Saint-Félix actually ordered his crew to fire on Cornwallis but that they refused. The British shadowed the French for several days, openly stopping and searching French merchant ships but without provoking a response from Saint-Félix. Résolue and Phoenix were subsequently detached by their commanders, Cornwallis and Saint-Félix remaining in contact for several more days before finally separating.

News of the encounter was conveyed back to France, but the country was at this time in one of the most turbulent eras of the ongoing Revolution and little notice was taken of events in India. Historian William James notes that under normal political circumstances the action would have had more significant ramifications, while Edward Pelham Brenton claims that the French deliberately ignored the report out of fear of antagonising Britain. In Britain, the Admiralty approved of Cornwallis' actions, suggesting that the French were deliberately using the guise of trade to support Mysore against Britain. The action had no effect on the ongoing war in India, which was now centred on the inland city of Seringapatam. As British forces closed on the city in February 1792, the Tipu Sultan initiated peace talks which brought the war to an end in exchange for concessions to the company and its Indian allies.

== See also ==
- Mysore invasion of Kerala
