= Action of 6 December 1782 =

- Part of the American Revolutionary War and the Anglo-French War (1778–1783)
Date	6 December 1782
Location	Off Martinique, Caribbean 14.710°N 60.803°W
Result	British victory

Belligerents
Great Britain	France

Commanders and leaders
John Collins	Jean-Charles de Borda

Strength
1 third rate ship of the line HMS Ruby	1 third rate ship of the line Solitaire; 1 brig Speedy

Casualties and losses
2 men wounded	Solitaire & Speedy captured, 35 killed & 55 wounded, 500 captured

The action of 6 December 1782 was a naval encounter primarily fought between HMS Ruby and the French ship Solitaire off the coast of Martinique. Ruby easily defeated Solitaire.

== Background ==
By the end of 1782 the Spanish and French had been on the defensive since the Battle of the Saintes, which signaled British domination of the seas in the Caribbean. Soon after, the Royal Navy were conducting a blockade off Cap-François and Fort-de-France as well as keeping a watch off Havana.

== Action ==
The Royal Navy squadron of Rear Admiral Richard Hughes on 6 December 1782 sighted a French squadron off Martinique. The 64-gun HMS Ruby, captained by John Collins, sailed towards the 1,521-ton French ship Solitaire of 64 guns, under the command of Jean-Charles de Borda. Collins eventually caught up with Solitaire and a single-ship action developed. After nearly forty minutes Solitaire had her mizzenmast shot away, her rigging and sails in tatters, and was becoming dead in the water. At that point Borda decided to strike her colours.

In the action the British also captured the French brig Speedy, which defended herself vigorously at the cost of heavy casualties, including the death of her captain.

Solitaire had 35 men killed and 55 wounded whilst Ruby had only two men wounded.

== Aftermath ==
Collins was knighted for his action. Solitaire entered the Royal Navy as HMS Solitaire and remained in service until 1790, when she was sold out of the navy. Jean-Charles de Borda, although captured along with his entire crew, was shortly released and returned as an engineer in the French Navy. He later achieved fame as a mathematician, physicist and political scientist.

== Citations and references ==
Citations

- Allen, Joseph (1852). Battles of the British Navy. London: Henry Bohn. pp. 349–350. "Solitaire."
- Marley, David (2005). Historic Cities of the Americas: An Illustrated Encyclopedia, Volume 1. ABC-CLIO. ISBN 9781576070277.
