= HMS Minerva (1780) =

Frigate of the Royal Navy

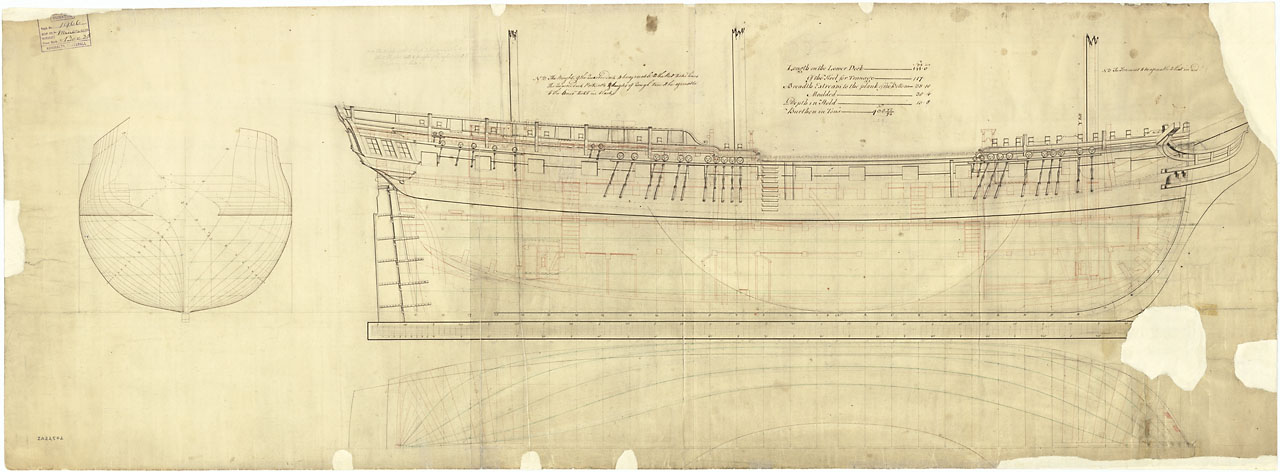
- Drawing of the outline of the Minerva

History

United Kingdom
- Name: HMS Minerva
- Operator: Royal Navy
- Ordered: 1778
- Builder: Woolwich Dockyard
- Laid down: 1778
- Launched: 3 June 1780
- Commissioned: 6 July 1780
- Honours and awards: Naval General Service Medal with clasp "Egypt"
- Fate: 1798 renamed Pallas, troopship; Broken up March 1803

General characteristics
- Class & type: Minerva-class frigate
- Tons burthen: 940 (bm)
- Length: 141 ft 0 in (42.98 m)
- Beam: 38 ft 10 in (11.84 m)
- Depth of hold: 13 ft 9 in (4.19 m)
- Propulsion: Sail
- Complement: 270 (raised to 280 on 25 April 1780)
- Armament: Upper deck:28 × 18-pounder guns; QD:8 × 6-pounder guns; Fc: 2 × 6-pounder guns

HMS Minerva was a 38-gun fifth-rate Royal Navy frigate. The first of four Minerva-class frigates, she was launched on 3 June 1780, and commissioned soon thereafter. In 1798, she was renamed Pallas and employed as a troopship. She was broken up in 1803.

== Service as HMS Minerva ==
Captain Charles Fielding commissioned Minerva in April 1780, for the Channel. At some point, Minerva captured the French brig Jupiter. Between the 24th and 27th of December 1780, Minerva captured the Thomas en Jank, the Yonge Frone Teglaar, and the Zeepost.

On 11 April 1781, Minerva was serving with Vice-Admiral George Darby's Channel Fleet off Cape St. Vincent when the British spotted three vessels. Darby sent Alexander, Foudroyant, and Minerva in pursuit, but the three vessels, which turned out to be enemy frigates, made it safely to Cadiz. Some time thereafter, vessels of the Fleet made attacks on some gunboats, during which Minerva had some men badly wounded. Minerva was among the many ships of Darby's Fleet that shared in the prize money for the capture of Duc de Chartres, the Spanish frigate Santa Leocadia, and the French brig Trois Amis. (Note: Trois Amis may have been a merchant vessel out of Amsterdam, of 122 tons.)

The next day, Darby's squadron of 29 ships of the line and the 100 store ships from England laden for the relief of Gibraltar that they were escorting, entered the bay there. Later, on 9 June Minerva sailed with the Lisbon trade.

On 9 October 1781, Minerva, Monsieur, Flora, and Crocodile captured the American privateer Hercules. The next day Minerva and Monsieur captured the American privateer Jason.

In early 1782, Captain the Honourable Thomas Pakenham assumed command of Minerva. On 11 March 1782, Minerva and Daphne captured the brig Pearl off Porto.

On 28 October, Minerva was among the British ships that shared in the capture of the Dutch East Indiaman Young Susanna, off Ceylon. (Note: Able or ordinary seamen received £2 6s in prize money. The amount represented a little more than a month's wages.)

Minerva was present at the action off Cuddalore on 20 June 1783, but as a transport, she was not involved in the fighting. As a storeship, she was transporting military stores and provisions in support of the British Army which was planning to attack Cuddalore.

Recommissioned in 1790 under Captain Robert Sutton, she sailed for the East Indies on 27 December. In the beginning of November 1791, Minerva, Commodore William Cornwallis, accompanied by the 36-gun frigate Phoenix, Captain Sir Richard Strachan, and Perseverance, Captain Isaac Smith, was in the roads at Tellicherry, a fort and anchorage situated a few leagues south of Mangalore. Phoenix was ordered to stop and search the French frigate Résolue, which was escorting a number of merchant ships believed to be carrying military supplies to support Tippu Sultan. Résolue resisted Phoenix and a brief fight ensued before Résolue struck her colours. The French captain insisted on considering his ship as a British prize, so Cornwallis ordered Strachan to tow her into Mahé and return her to the French commodore.

=== French Revolutionary Wars ===
In 1793, Captain J. Whitby took command of Minerva, which was flying Rear Admiral Cornwallis's flag. On 24 June she took the ship Citoyen off Cuddalore.

From 1 August 1793, together with three East Indiamen — Triton, Warley, and Royal Charlotte — Minerva blockaded the Port of Pondicherry while the army besieged the fort. The governor initially refused to surrender, so on 20 August the British began a bombardment. The governor surrendered the town on 23 August. During the siege, Minerva, with the admiral on board, chased off the French frigate Sybile, which had attempted to reach the town. Sybille had had 150 artillerymen on board so chasing her off was helpful to the siege. The British vessels also captured a vessel "from the islands" that was bringing in military supplies.

Minerva returned to Britain and was paid off in April 1794. In July 1795, Captain Thomas Peyton recommissioned her for service in Strachan's squadron, which was attached to the main British fleet.

In September 1796, Gilbert Elliot, the British viceroy of the Anglo-Corsican Kingdom, decided that it was necessary to clear out Capraia, which belonged to the Genoese and which served as a base for privateers. He sent Lord Nelson in Captain, together with Gorgon, Vanneau], the cutter Rose, and troops of the 51st Regiment of Foot to accomplish this task in September. On their way, Minerva joined them. The troops landed on 18 September and the island surrendered immediately. On 27 September, Minerva was in company with the hired armed cutter Lady Jane when they captured two Spanish vessels, the Santa Francisco Xavier and the Nuestra Señora de la Misericordia.

On 13 November 1796, Minerva and Melampus, encountered the French corvette Etonnant off Barfleur and drove her ashore. Etonnant carried eighteen 18-pounders and was a new vessel on her first cruise. She was carrying naval and military stores from Havre to Brest.

On 19 April 1797, the hired armed cutter Grand Falconner with Diamond, Minerva, Cynthia and Camilla in company, captured the American ship Favourite. Later that month, Diamond and Minerva grounded near Cape Barfleur and both had to be docked for repairs when they returned to port.

Still, in October Minerva and Lively captured the Marselloise as she was sailing from Guadeloupe to France. They then took the richly laden former Sugar Cane into Martinique.

== Service as troopship HMS Pallas ==
Between July 1797 and May 1798, the Admiralty converted Minerva into a troopship armed en flûte and renamed her Pallas. Pallas, the lead ship of the Pallas-class frigates, had just been wrecked, freeing the name. Captain John Mackellar recommissioned Pallas in February 1798.

In May 1798, Pallas (though still known as Minerva in the dispatches) participated in Home Popham's expedition to Ostend. The British Army force of about 1,300 were landed to destroy the locks and sluice gates on the Bruges canal to prevent the French from moving gunboats and transports from Flushing to Ostend and Dunkirk for an invasion of Britain. Although the British succeeded in damaging the sluice gates, the evacuation of the contingent failed due to bad weather and they were captured. The French also captured Mackellar and his boat crew.

Commander Joseph Edmunds took over as captain in July. On 20 May 1800, Pallas was in the squadron under the command of Vice-Admiral Lord Keith, off Genoa. Keith was blockading and bombarding Genoa when he decided to send in boats under the cover of the bombardment to try to cut out some armed French vessels. At 1am on the 21st the boats succeeded in boarding, carrying, and bringing off the largest galley, the Prima. She had fifty oars and a crew of 257 men, and was under the command of Captain Patrizio Galleano. She was armed with two brass 36-pounder guns and had 30 brass swivel guns stored below deck, together with a large quantity of side arms and small arms. The British suffered only four men wounded, one of whom was from Pallas.

Then on 30 May, Pallas recaptured the English (Minorcan) tartane Rosario, which was sailing from Leghorn to Minorca, in ballast. Two days later Pallas captured a Ragusan ship sailing from Leghorn to Barcelona with a cargo of sundries. On 7 June Pallas captured the Ardita off the coast of Italy. Amongst other cargo she was carrying statuary.

From 8 August 1801, Pallas was involved in transporting a portion of the British Army under General Coote from Cairo to the west of Alexandria. The Siege of Alexandria ended on 30 August with the capitulation of Alexandria. Because Pallas served in the navy's Egyptian campaign (8 March to 8 September 1801), her officers and crew qualified for the clasp "Egypt" to the Naval General Service Medal that the Admiralty issued in 1847 to all surviving claimants.

== Fate ==
Pallas was paid off in May 1802 and put in ordinary. She was broken up at Chatham in March 1803.
