= HMS Shannon (1803) =

Perseverance-class frigate of the Royal Navy

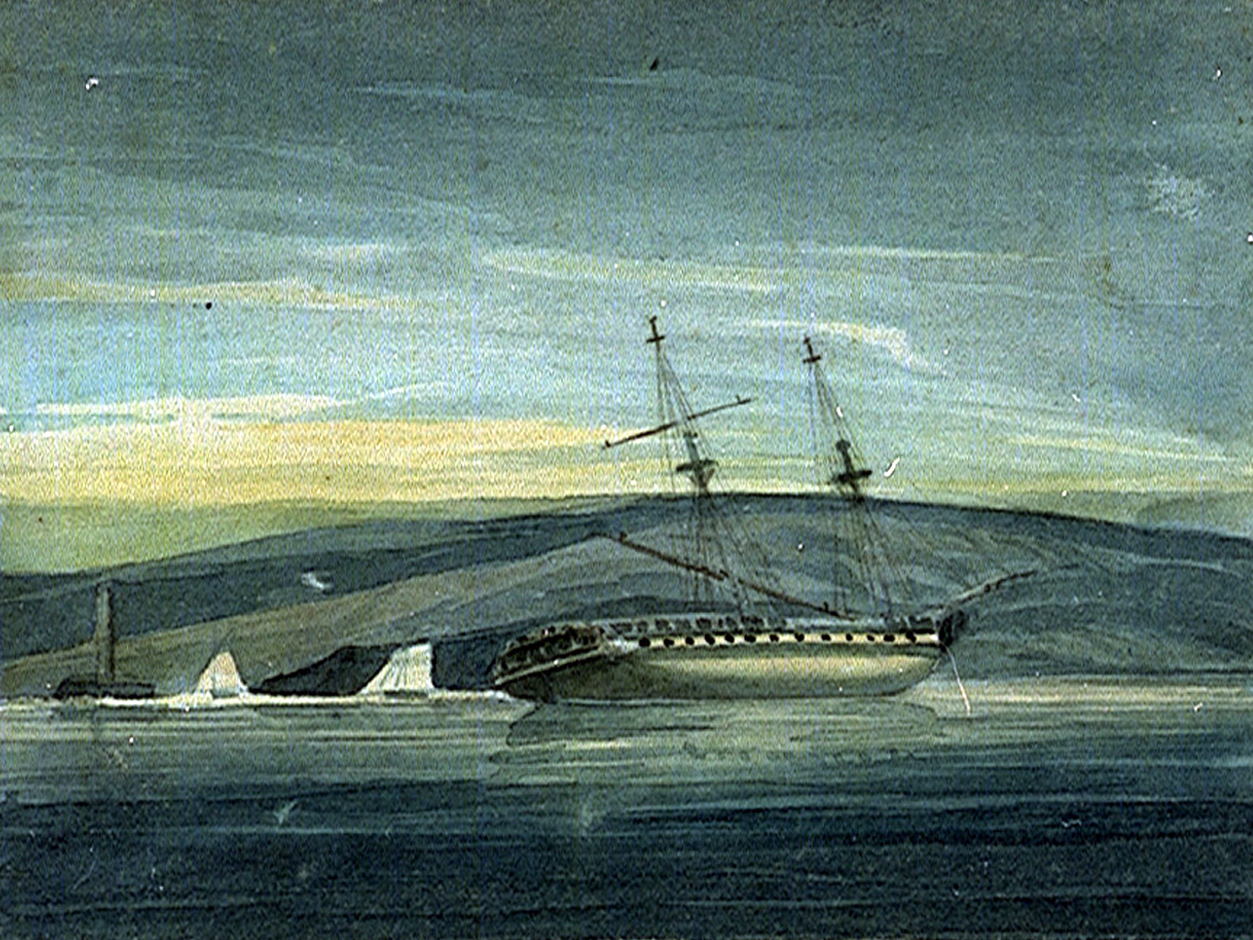
- c. 1803 watercolour of Shannon grounded

History

United Kingdom
- Name: HMS Shannon
- Ordered: 8 July 1801
- Builder: Josiah and Thomas Brindley, Frindsbury, Kent
- Laid down: August 1801
- Launched: 2 September 1803
- Fate: Wrecked 10 December 1803

General characteristics
- Type: 36-gun Perseverance-class fifth-rate frigate
- Tons burthen: 88128/98 bm
- Length: Overall: 137 ft 1 1/2 in (41.8 m); Keel: 113 ft 4 3/8 in (34.6 m)
- Beam: 38 ft 2 3/4 in (11.7 m)
- Depth of hold: 13 ft 5 1/4 in (4.1 m)
- Propulsion: Sails
- Complement: 264
- Armament: Upper deck: 26 × 18-pounder guns; QD: 2 × 9-pounder guns + 10 × 32-pounder carronades; Fc: 2 × 9-pounder guns + 2 × 32-pounder carronades

HMS Shannon was a 36-gun Perseverance-class fifth-rate frigate of the Royal Navy built at Frindsbury on the River Medway. Completed on 3 September 1803, she served in the Napoleonic Wars. Her name was changed from Pallas to Shannon shortly before construction, traditionally an omen of bad luck for a ship. In her case, she was wrecked within three months of her being launched.

== Wreck ==
She was attached to the Channel fleet and spent the next few months under her captain, Edward Leveson-Gower, on patrol off the Cape La Hogue searching for French coastal shipping and privateers attempting to slip out of the Normandy port of Cherbourg. The 18-gun brig HMS Merlin, under Edward Pelham Brenton, accompanied her.

At 8pm on 10 December, just three months after she was completed, the ship was lost on Tatihou Island, near Barfleur, directly under an enemy battery. There was a heavy gale blowing and in the darkness, Leveson-Gower lost his position after losing sight of the Barfleur lighthouse. Assuming he had sea room, he attempted to wear around; a lee tide caught Shannon and crashed her straight onto the rocks. Merlin spotted land thanks to a bolt of lightning and was able to wear off in time.

Efforts overnight to lighten Shannon succeeded in that eventually she floated, but she was so full of water that she grounded again and it was evident that she was lost. During these efforts, a French battery fired on Shannon, striking her with some 60 shots and killing three men wounding eight. At 8:30p.m. Shannon struck. The surviving crew were able to scramble ashore unharmed, where the French troops garrisoning the battery above the wreck captured them. Some French fishing boats led by Ensign Lacroix took possession of Shannon, and saw that her hull was so damaged that she would be impossible to refloat.

Merlin stood back into shore on the 16th and at 11.30am dispatched two boats of marines and sailors to destroy Shannon to prevent the French from salvaging her guns and stores. Despite heavy fire from the island's batteries the boarders were able to burn and destroy the frigate without suffering a single casualty. (Note: Troude states that the burning of Shannon occurred in the night of 16 December, while salvage operations were proceeding.)

== Aftermath ==
Edward Pelham Brenton was the younger brother of Captain Jahleel Brenton, who was a captive at Verdun, where Leveson-Gower would join him in January 1804. About three and a quarter years after the loss of Shannon, Leveson-Gower and his officers returned to England. There a court martial honorably acquitted them of all blame for the loss.
