= HMS Doris (1808) =

Frigate of the Royal Navy

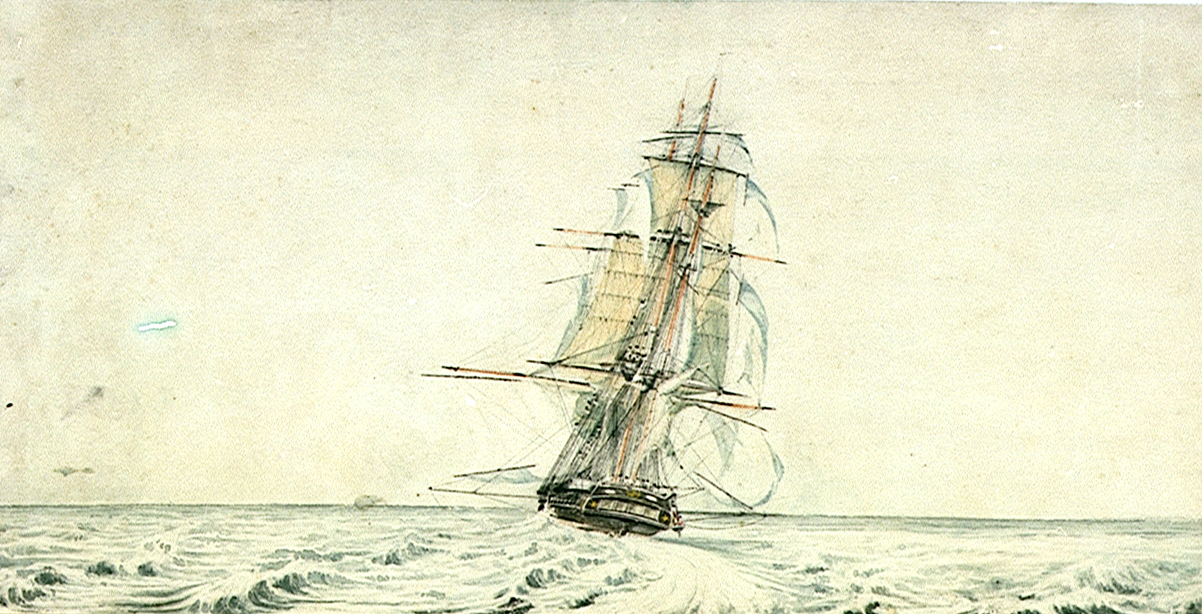
- HMS Doris rounding to under all sail to pick up a man in 1828

History

United Kingdom
- Name: HMS Doris
- Namesake: Doris
- Ordered: 5 June 1803
- Builder: Bombay Dockyard
- Laid down: 25 April 1806
- Launched: 24 March 1807
- Renamed: Launched as Salsette; Renamed Pitt on 26 August 1807; Renamed HMS Doris on 3 April 1808
- Fate: Sold in April 1829

General characteristics
- Class & type: 36-gun Perseverance-class fifth-rate frigate
- Tons burthen: 870 (bm)
- Length: 137 ft (42 m)
- Beam: 38 ft (12 m)
- Propulsion: Sails
- Sail plan: Full-rigged ship
- Complement: 260
- Armament: Original; Upper gun deck (UD): 26 × 18-pounder guns; QD: 8 × 9-pounder guns; Fc: 2 × 9-pounder guns; By 1815; UD: 26 × 18-pounder guns; QD: 2 × 9-pounder guns + 10 × 32-pounder carronades; Fc: 2 × 9-pounder guns + 2 × 32-pounder carronades

HMS Doris was a 36-gun Perseverance-class fifth-rate frigate of the Royal Navy that served between 1808 and 1829.

== Career ==
Doris was built for the Royal Navy in the East India Company Dockyard in Bombay in 1807. She was launched as Salsette, and was renamed locally as Pitt later that year. However, because the Royal Navy already had an HMS Pitt in service, the Admiralty renamed her again as HMS Doris.

HMS Doris initially saw service in the Malacca Straits and the South China Sea. Doris and Psyche captured in the China Sea an American ship named Rebecca. They brought her into Bombay where the new Vice admiralty court condemned her. Her cargo of 4,000 bags of Batavian sugar and 13,710 pieces of sapan-wood were auctioned on 7 March 1810. Then on 10 March Rebecca, of 600 tons burthen, teak-built at Pegu, too was auctioned off.

Towards the end of 1810 Doris was involved in the Mauritius campaign.

In 1811 she participated in the invasion of Java. (Note: The Admiral's share of the prize money for the capture of Île de France was £2650 5s 2d. A first-class share was worth £278 19s 5¾d; a sixth-class share, that of an ordinary seaman, was worth £3 7s 6¼d. A fourth and final payment was made in July 1828. A first-class share was worth £29 19s 5¼d; a sixth-class share was worth 8s 2½d. This time, Bertie received £314 14s 3½d.)

On 18 March 1814 Doris captured the American merchant ship Hunter off Macau.

On 8 May chased an American schooner from New York through the estuary and into Pearl River. The American succeeded in reaching Whampoa where she anchored. Doris than sent her boats with 70 men into the river and captured the American ship. Only one British seaman was killed but several of the Americans died. The boarding party from Doris cut the schooner’s cables to sail her out from Chinese jurisdiction but the ship went aground. The boarding party then abandoned her.

Doris finally brought Hunter into Bombay on 12 August for the recently established Vice admiralty court to condemn.

Doris apparently returned to Canton because around mid-September her boats recaptured Arabella, which the Portuguese had moved just outside Macanese waters. The American letter of marque ship Rambler had captured Arabella as Arabella was sailing from Bengal to Sumatra. Rambler brought Arabella with her as Rambler sailed onto Canton, but sent her into Macao when the Americans realized that Doris was at Canton. Doris's retaking of Arabella sparked a small incident between the British East India Company and the local authorities, who eventually accepted that Arabella was a lawful prize to Doris.

Captain O'Brien, of Doris found he could not sell his prize, Arabella, on the China coast. When he received orders to proceed to Malacca after his replacement had arrived he wanted to take Arabella with him to try to sell her in Malaya. However, the night before they were to leave a severe gale caused Arabella to break her cables. She then broke up on nearby rocks.

== Post-war ==
Doris place in ordinary in 1815. She was recommissioned in 1821 and served two tours of duty on the South America station during the Chilean and Brazilian wars of independence and the Cisplatine War of 1825-1828 between Argentina and Brazil.

== Fate ==
By the late 1820s, decayed timbers in her bow made her unfit for further service, and she was sold at Valparaíso in April 1829.

== Captains ==
During her 21 years in the Royal Navy she had eight captains. One of them was Barrington Reynolds, who commanded her for a short period in 1812, between his commands of Sir Francis Drake and Bucephalus. Another was Thomas Graham, who died en route to Chile in 1822, with his wife, the travel writer Maria Graham, on board.
