= HMS Lively (1756) =

20-gun post ship of the Royal Navy, launched in 1756

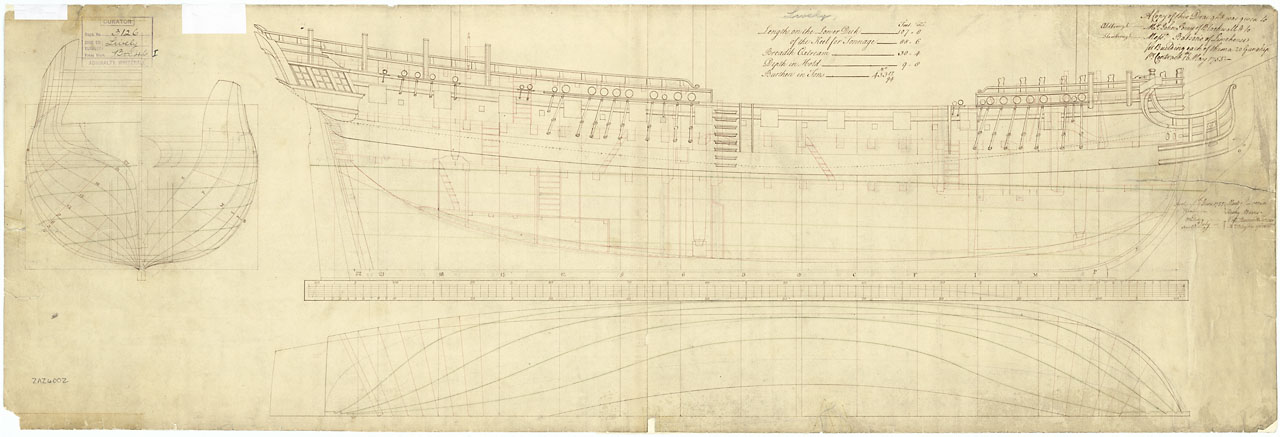
- A plan of the Lively

History

Great Britain
- Name: HMS Lively
- Ordered: 20 May 1755
- Builder: Moody Janverin, Bursledon, Hampshire
- Laid down: c. June 1755
- Launched: 10 August 1756
- Commissioned: August 1756
- Decommissioned: August 1781
- Captured: 10 July 1778

France
- Acquired: 10 July 1778
- Captured: 29 July 1781

Great Britain
- Acquired: 29 July 1781
- Fate: Sold 11 March 1784

General characteristics
- Tons burthen: 43864/94 (bm)
- Length: Overall:108 ft 0 in (32.9 m); Keel:89 ft 0 1/4 in (27.1 m)
- Beam: 30 ft 5 1/4 in (9.3 m)
- Depth of hold: 9 ft 8 in (2.9 m)
- Complement: 160 officers and men
- Armament: British service: 20 × 9-pounder guns; French service: 22 × 9-pounder guns + 2 × 4-pounder guns

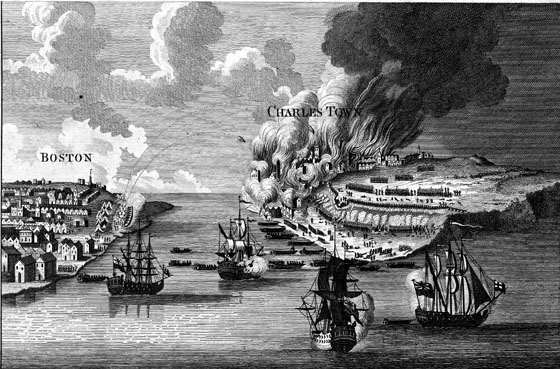
Lively participates in the Battle of Bunker Hill

HMS Lively was a 20-gun post ship of the Royal Navy, launched in 1756. During the Seven Years' War she captured several vessels, most notably the French corvette Valeur in 1760. She then served during the American Revolutionary War, where she helped initiate the Battle of Bunker Hill. The French captured her in 1778, but the British recaptured her in 1781. She was sold in 1784.

== Seven Years' War ==
Lively was commissioned in July 1756 under Captain Francis Wyatt. In November 1756 she captured the French privateer Intrépide, of Nantes, and her prize, Charming Molly, which had been sailing from Malaga to Bristol. Intrépide was armed with eight guns and 10 swivel guns, and had a crew of 75 men. Lively brought the two vessels into Plymouth. Around this time she also recaptured the merchant vessel Pike, of Liverpool.

Lively sailed for Jamaica on 31 January 1757. In March 1759 she was under the command of Captain Frederick Maitland, at Jamaica.

On 17 October 1760 she was with Hampshire and Boreas when they intercepted five French vessels in the Windward Passage. The French vessels had sailed from Cape Francois and were carrying sugar and indigo.

The next day Lively, using her sweeps, caught up with the sternmost enemy vessel, the French 20-gun corvette Valeur. Valeur had a crew of 160 men under the command of a Captain Talbot. In the hour-and-a-half fight before Valeur struck, Lively had two men killed but no wounded; Valeur had 38 killed and 25 wounded, including her captain, master, and boatswain. At the same time, Boreas captured Sirenne, and Hampshire chased the merchant frigate Prince Edward on shore where her crew set fire to her, causing her to blow up.

The day after that, on 19 October, Hampshire, with Lively and Valeur, cornered the French frigate Fleur de Lis in Freshwater Bay, a little to leeward of Port-de-Paix; her crew too set her on fire. The merchant frigate Duc de Choiseul, of 32 guns and 180 men under the command of Captain Bellevan, escaped into Port-de-Paix.

In March 1762 Captain J. Jorer took command of Lively from Maitland. Captain Keith Stewart replaced Jorer later that year, and cruised her in home waters. In June 1763 he sailed her to the Mediterranean and remained in command into 1764.

In April 1769 Captain Robert Fanshawe recommissioned Lively for the Channel. Fanshawe apparently commanded her through 1770, and in 1771 was superseded by Captain G. Talbot. In early 1771 Lively served at Plymouth as the flagship of Admiral Richard Spry. Then on 18 June 1771 Talbot sailed her to North America. In 1773 Captain William Peere Williams took command of Lively on 11 October 1773, sailing her back to Britain and paying her off in December. Captain Thomas Bishop recommissioned Lively in January 1774. On 16 April he sailed her for North America. She was in the area of Salem & Marblehead, Mass. on 1 January 1775.

== American Revolutionary War ==
On 13 May 1774, Lively arrived in Boston. She brought with her General Thomas Gage, commissioned as governor of the Province of Massachusetts Bay. Lively was part of the British fleet that blockaded the port of Boston to enforce the Boston Port Act, a punishment of that city for the Boston Tea Party. On 22 March 1775 she seized a schooner off Cape Ann for violation of the Acts of Trade. Following the outbreak of the American Revolutionary War in April 1775, she remained part of the British presence during the Siege of Boston. On 6 May 1775 she seized $23,000 from a ship at Marblehead, Massachusetts, that had salvaged the money from a dismasted Spanish ship on the Grand Banks after rescuing her crew. She was the first ship to fire at the fortifications the American colonial militia had erected, helping to spark the Battle of Bunker Hill.

In 1776 she cruised off Marblehead. She captured a number of vessels off Cape Ann: in February the schooner Tartar; in May an unknown sloop (unknown because the crew abandoned her and fled, taking all her papers with them); on 26 June, Lively, Milford and Hope took the schooner Lydia, bound for the West Indies. The Vice-Admiralty Court at Halifax, Nova Scotia, ruled all three to be prizes.

Lively also escorted the victualler Levant to New York, Delaware, Cape Fear and St. Augustine.

== Capture and re-capture ==
In March 1777 Captain Robert Biggs recommissioned Lively. On 10 July 1778 Lively, having escorted an ordnance sloop to Guernsey, then proceeded to sail to meet Admiral Keppel's fleet off Ushant. In the morning, as the fog lifted, she found herself near the French fleet, under Louis Guillouet, comte d'Orvilliers. The French cutter Curieuse, of 10 guns and under the command of Captain Trolong du Rumain, chased Lively and ordered her to lie to, which order Biggs declined. However, the 32-gun Iphigénie, Captain Kersaint de Coëtnempren, came up and ordered Biggs to sail Lively to the French admiral. Biggs was still arguing when Iphigénie fired a broadside. The broadside killed 12 British sailors; thereupon, Biggs struck.

The French Navy took Lively into service. In January–February 1779 she was part of a squadron, together with Résolue, under Admiral Vaudreuil, that captured Fort St Louis in Senegal from the British. The troops were under the command of the Duc de Lauzun.

Lively then sailed to the Caribbean. In June 1779 she was the lead ship in a small flotilla sent from Martinique to capture British-controlled Saint Vincent.

On 29 July 1781, Captain Skeffington Lutwidge's Perseverance recaptured Lively, which was under the command of Lieutenant de Breignon. Lively put up a short, desperate defense during which she had six men killed and 10 wounded, one of whom died later. Lively was on her return from Cayenne, had been at sea for 53 days, and ten days earlier had captured Rosemount and Katherine, which had been sailing from Cork. In capturing Lively, Perseverance recaptured the two brigs. Lively had also been in company with the corvette Hirondelle, which however escaped. Thirty-two vessels of the British fleet shared the prize money, which was declared on 17 August 1782.

By September 1781 Lively was off Sandy Hook, with Admiral Robert Digby's squadron. By 14 November Lively, under Captain Manley, had returned to Britain with dispatches from Rear-Admiral Thomas Graves.

On 3 October 1782, Lively captured the sloop Charles, laden with stock and sailing to Turks Island.

== Fate ==
She was sold in March 1784.
