= HMS Meleager (1806) =

Frigate of the Royal Navy

History

United Kingdom
- Name: HMS Meleager
- Builder: Chatham Dockyard (M/Shipwright Robert Seppings)
- Launched: 25 November 1806
- Fate: Wrecked on 30 July 1808 off Jamaica

General characteristics
- Class & type: Fifth-rate Perseverance-class 36-gun frigate
- Tons burthen: 874 58/94 (bm)
- Length: 137 ft 0 in (41.8 m) (gundeck); 113 ft 1 1/2 in (34.5 m) (keel)
- Beam: 38 ft 1 1/2 in (11.6 m)
- Depth of hold: 13 ft 5 in (4.1 m)
- Sail plan: Full-rigged ship
- Complement: 260 men
- Armament: Upper deck: 26 × 18-pounder guns; QD: 2 × 9-pounder guns + 10 × 32-pounder carronades; Fc: 2 × 9-pounder guns + 2 × 32-pounder carronades

HMS Meleager was a 36-gun fifth-rate Perseverance-class frigate of the Royal Navy. She was launched in 1806 and wrecked on 30 July 1808 off Jamaica. During her brief career she captured two armed vessels and two merchantmen on the Jamaica station. She was named after Meleager, who could have been a Macedonian officer of distinction in the service of Alexander the Great, or a Meleager a character from Greek mythology.

== Active service ==
In November 1806 Meleager was commissioned under Captain John Broughton for the North Sea. In mid-1807 Meleager accompanied HMS Shannon above 80 degrees latitude in a mission to protect the Greenland whaling fleet. They found neither whalers nor threats and so on 23 August they were back in Leith Roads, seeking replenishment, having spent three months above the Arctic Circle. They then sailed for the Shetland Islands where they cruised for about another month.

Meleager, under Captain J. Broughton, was in company with Quebec, Vestal and Forester when they captured Fischia on 14 April 1807. Then on 5 September 1807, Meleager captured Jonge Lars.

On 16 November 1807 Meleager sailed with a convoy to the West Indies. On 8 February 1808, Meleager was off Santiago de Cuba when she sent her boats, with 41 men, to capture the French felucca-rigged privateer Renard. She was armed with one long 6-pounder gun and many muskets, and had a crew of 47 men. The boat party took her without loss even though she was perfectly prepared and expecting to be attacked, given that Meleager had chased her. At the approach of the boats, 18 men jumped overboard. Renard had been cruising for 27 days but had not taken anything.

Eleven days later, Meleager captured Antelope, a Spanish schooner Letter of Marque. Antelope was pierced for 14 guns but only carried five, an 18-pounder midships and four 6-pounders; the 6-pounders she threw overboard during the chase. She had a crew of 62 men and was sailing from Cadiz to Vera Cruz with a cargo of dry goods, brandy and wine. The Royal Navy purchased her and renamed her HMS Firefly.

In early 1808 Meleager detained the American schooner Meteor between the Cuban cities of Trinidad and Santiago, on the pretext that she was going to violate the British embargo. A judge in Jamaica ordered Meteor released, but not before her owner, Richard Raynal Keene, had to pay $2000 to cover his and Broughton's costs. The detainment led to further pecuniary misfortunes for Keene. In April 1808 Captain Frederick Warren replaced Brougton.

The French privateer Plutus on 4 July 1808 captured Commerce, which had been sailing from the Halifax to Jamaica. Meleager recaptured Commerce three days later and sent her into Jamaica.

== Fate ==
On 30 July 1808 Meleager, under the command of Captain Frederick Warren, had been sailing from Port Royal, Jamaica, when in the evening the master, believing that land in sight was Portland Point, set a course that would take her well clear of land. Still, less than half an hour later lookouts spotted broken water ahead; although the helmsman attempted to turn Meleager, she struck. Efforts to get her off or to stem the inflow of water were unsuccessful. During the night the crew took down the masts and made rafts; once daylight arrived the task became to get everyone safely on shore. A line was strung to the shore of Bare Bush Key and all but three crewmen made it safely ashore. For the next few days the crew worked to salvage a large amount of stores and the guns.

On 30 August Captain Warren, his officers and crew went before a court martial on Milan at Port Royal. The court martial ruled that the wrecking was probably due to the master mistaking Braziletto Hill for Portland Point and so setting a wrong course. The court martial board warned Warren and the master to be more careful in the future and to pay closer attention to the courses they steered and the distances they had covered.
