= Edward Pelham Brenton =

British Royal Navy officer (1774–1839)

Captain Edward Pelham Brenton CB
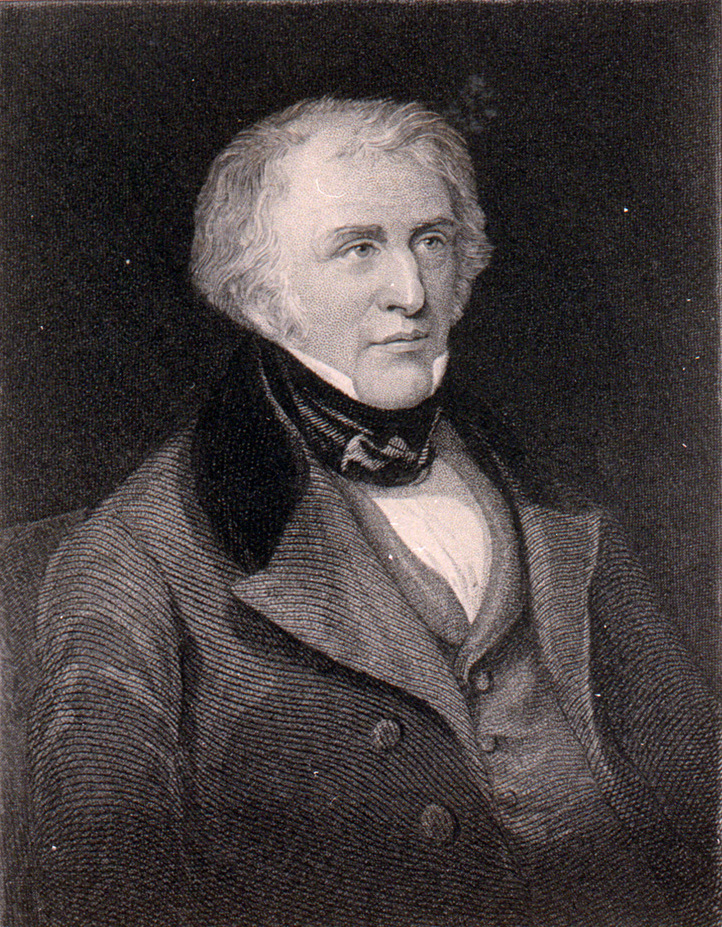
- 1837 portrait
- Born: 20 July 1774; Rhode Island
- Died: 13 April 1839 (aged 64); London, England
- Military career
- Allegiance: Great Britain; United Kingdom
- Branch: Royal Navy
- Service years: 1788–1815
- Rank: Captain
- Conflicts: French Revolutionary Wars; Napoleonic Wars
- Other work: author of Naval History of Great Britain from the Year 1783 to 1822

Captain Edward Pelham Brenton CB (20 July 1774 – 13 April 1839) was a Royal Navy officer and historian who served in the French Revolutionary and Napoleonic Wars. Brenton's military career was relatively unremarkable apart from his involvement in the British capture of Martinique in 1809. He became famous after the conflict when he published the Naval History of Great Britain from the Year 1783 to 1822 in 1823. The book was popular, but Brenton was criticised at the time and since for his failure to distinguish between fact and rumour as well as his partisan political leanings. In Brenton's later years, he was involved in charitable enterprises in the poorer areas of London with mixed success.

== Naval career ==
Brenton was born in 1774 in Rhode Island to Admiral Jahleel Brenton and his wife Henrietta. His elder brother, also named Jahleel, later became a celebrated naval commander and admiral. The Brentons were American loyalists and emigrated to Britain during the American War of Independence, where Edward joined the Royal Navy in 1788 aged 14. In the Navy, Brenton spent time serving in the East Indies and the Channel Fleet, being promoted to lieutenant in 1795 and serving in the North Sea and off Newfoundland until 1802, when he was promoted to commander. In 1802 he was captain of the 18-gun ship-sloop Lark, taking her from Jamaica to the Channel. In 1803 he married Margaret Cox (daughter of General Thomas Cox) and had many children.

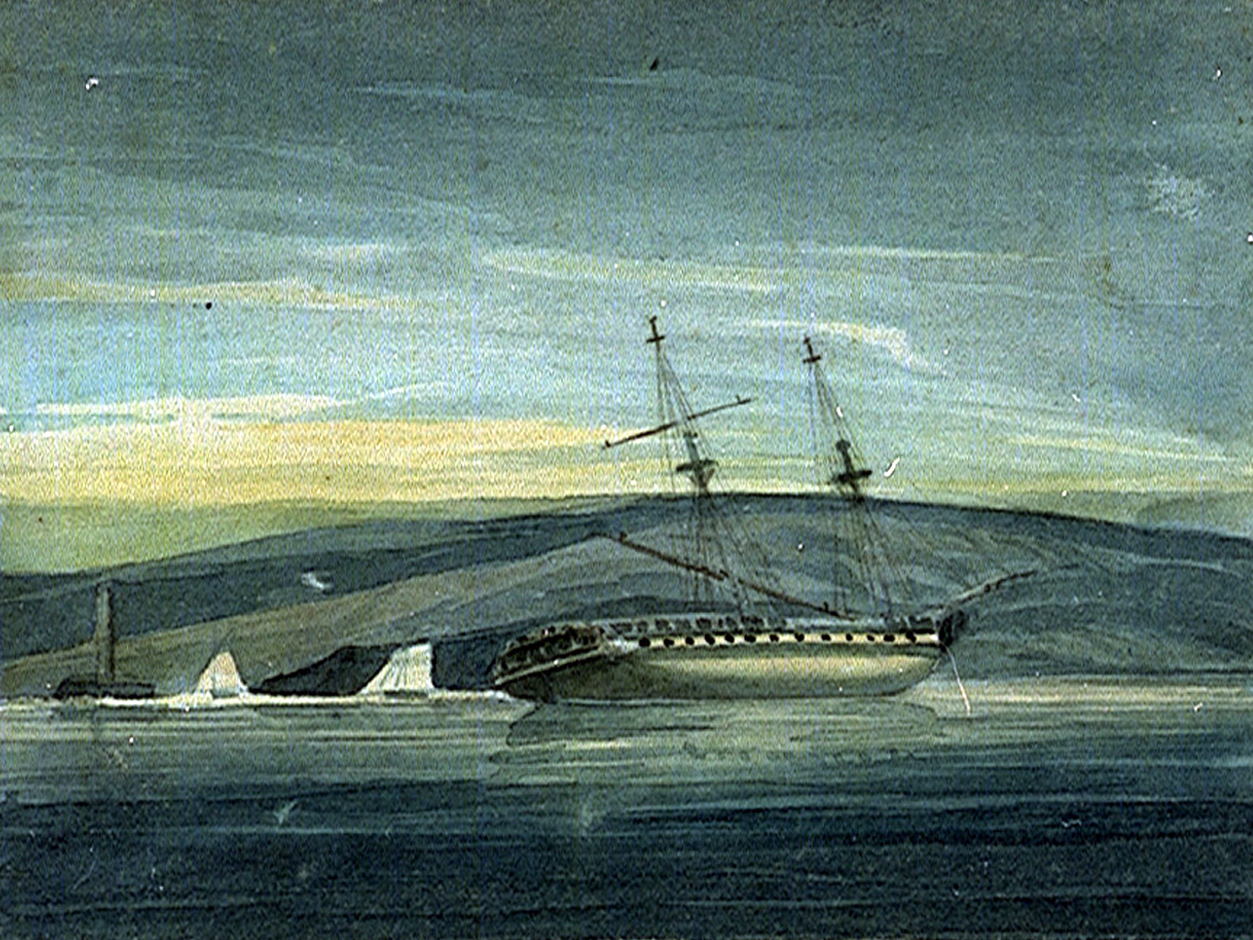
1803 watercolour by Brenton of HMS Shannon grounded

At the outbreak of the Napoleonic Wars in 1803, Brenton was given command of the small brig HMS Merlin, in which he operated in the English Channel, burning the wreck of HMS Shannon near Barfleur to prevent its seizure by the French in the same year. In January 1805, Brenton took command of the brig HMS Amaranthe in the North Sea and in 1808 moved to the West Indies, where he distinguished himself in an attack on a small French convoy off Martinique on 13 December, notably against Cygne. Promoted to post captain for this operation, Brenton briefly took temporary command of the post ship Cyane (May to September 1810), HMS Pompee, and then HMS Belleisle, before being confirmed in his brother's previous ship HMS Spartan in 1810. Spartan served in the War of 1812, although without participating in any actions, and Brenton was placed in reserve in 1813, returning briefly to service in 1815 before retiring permanently.

== Historical career ==
Following his time in the Navy, Brenton became a keen if controversial historian, publishing his five volume Naval History of Great Britain from the Year 1783 to 1822 in 1823 and the Life and Correspondence of John, Earl of St. Vincent in 1838. Brenton's works were controversial, because he rarely attempted to sift fact from rumour, provoking an outcry from those affected by these, often inaccurate, revelations. Particularly scathing of Brenton was William James, whose alternative history of the naval campaigns of the French Revolutionary and Napoleonic Wars was published in 1827. James was a political rival of Brenton and a civilian who had never served in the Navy, and the men exchanged very public disagreements over points of fact.

Brenton's other passion was for charitable works, publishing many pamphlets and setting up schemes to aid the poor, particularly the "Society for the Relief of Shipwrecked Mariners" and the "Children's Friend Society", neither of which achieved their aims and provoked criticism of Brenton's methods. This experience left him bitter in the years approaching his death in April 1839 at his home in York Street, London. He was buried at St Marylebone Parish Church, with his wife and 100 boys of the Children's Friend Society among the mourners.

The year before his death, he was appointed a Companion of the Order of the Bath (CB) in the 1838 Coronation Honours.

== Works ==
- Naval History of Great Britain from the Year 1783 to 1836
- Life and Correspondence of John, Earl of St. Vincent
