= French brig Speedy (1782) =

Speedy was a brig of 130 tons (bm) belonging to the British Post Office Packet Service that the French Navy captured off Barbados in July 1782 and took into service at Martinique. The Royal Navy recaptured her in December. She subsequently became a merchant vessel.

On 15 July, after having cruised for 50 days, the French 32-gun frigates Friponne, Lieutenant le Chevalier de Blachon, and Résolue, captain de Saint-Jean, captured Speedy, Swift, the four merchant vessels Spy, Adventure, Peggy, and Success, and the 10-gun privateer cutter Queen. The British ships were on their way to the Windward Islands. (Note: Some reports give the date of capture as 11 August. However, that was the date of a letter by le Chevalier de Blanchon announcing the captures, which letter the Ipswich Journal published.)

Speedy, Captain Sampson Spargo, and Swift, both of 16 guns and 80 men, were Post Office packet boats. (Note: Speedy's captain may have been E. Douvergue. He had been appointed on 13 May 1782, following Spargo, who had been appointed on 18 August 1779.) They were carrying despatches for Barbadoes, St Lucia, Antigua and Jamaica. Speedy, which had left Falmouth on 18 June, was the packet that the government was expecting to arrive in Britain with the news of the departure of the homeward-bound fleet from Jamaica. The French took Speedy and Swift into Martinique, and the rest of the prizes into Guadeloupe. At Martinique the French Navy took Speedy into service. (Note: Swift was sold at Pointe-à-Pitre in November and arrived at Lorient in February 1783.)

There is reason to believe that Speedy and Swift mistook the two French frigates for Virginia tobacco boats and chased them. (The frigates may have "marked their ports" to disguise themselves.) It is clear that if the packets had realized the two frigates were enemy frigates the packets might easily have escaped. There is also reason to believe that the packets were not in their proper latitude and were too long in company, given their destinations. Still, the government did compensate masters, owners, and crew for losses experienced as a result of enemy action.

On 6 December, the British recaptured Speedy off Barbados. Speedy was part of a squadron that comprised 64-gun Solitaire, Triton, Résolue, and Nymphe. The French squadron sailed on 24 November from Saint-Pierre, Martinique.

After a dark night, Solitaire, Captain Jean-Charles de Borda, found herself in the morning close to a squadron of eight British ships under the command of Rear-Admiral Sir Richard Hughes, which was on its way from Gibraltar. The English gave chase and Solitaire sailed to delay them and give the rest of the French squadron a chance to escape.

At 12:30 an engagement developed between Solitaire and HMS Ruby. As another British vessel approached Solitaire had to strike. Speedy was captured in the same action, after a vigorous defense. In the action, her captain, Ribiers, was killed, together with a large part of her crew.

Lloyd's Register for 1789 lists the brig Speedy, of 130 tons (bm), as being of French origin, and with records dating to 1782. It lists her master as W. Messer, her owner as Passmore, and her trade as London-Lisbon. She is no longer listed in Lloyd's Register for 1789, the next issue that is available online.
