= HMS Merlin (1803) =

UK naval sloop 1803–1836

History

United Kingdom
- Name: Hercules
- Builder: South Shields
- Launched: 1801
- Fate: Sold 1803

United Kingdom
- Name: HMS Merlin
- Acquired: 1803 by purchase
- Fate: Sold 1836

General characteristics
- Type: Sloop
- Tons burthen: 395 (bm)
- Length: 104 ft 0 in (31.7 m) (overall); 79 ft 10 in (24.3 m) (keel)
- Beam: 30 ft 6 in (9.3 m)
- Depth of hold: 12 ft 10 in (3.9 m)
- Sail plan: Sloop
- Complement: 100 (British service)
- Armament: Upper deck: 14 × 32-pounder carronades; Spar deck: 4 × 24-pounder carronades; Fc: 2 × 9-pounder bow guns

HMS Merlin was launched in 1801 in South Shields as the collier Hercules. In July 1803, with the resumption of war with France, the Admiralty purchased her. She was one of about 20 such vessels that the navy would then employ primarily for convoy escort duties. She served on active duty until 1810, capturing one small privateer. She then served as a receiving ship until 1836 when the navy sold her for breaking up.

== Career ==
The Admiralty purchased Hercules in July 1803, renaming her Merlin. From 20 July to 20 September she was at Deptford fitting out for naval service. Commander Edward Pelham Brenton commissioned her in September.

On 28 October 1803, Merlin and Milbrook were off Dunkirk when they pursued and drove on shore the French privateer lugger Sept Freres. Sept Freres was armed with two guns and had a crew of 30 men under the command of Citizen Pollet. Milbrook anchored close to the lugger and came under fire from some field guns on shore. Though she took some hits, the British suffered no casualties. Head money was finally paid in May 1827. (Note: A first class share of the head money was worth £39 13s 0¾d; a fifth-class share, that of a seaman, was worth 4s 11¼d.)

In December Merlin was attached to the Channel fleet and was in company with Shannon on patrol off the Cape La Hogue searching for French coastal shipping and privateers attempting to slip out of the Normandy port of Cherbourg. At 8pm on 10 December, Shannon grounded on Tatihou Island, near Barfleur, during a heavy gale. Merlin spotted land thanks to a bolt of lightning and was able to wear off in time.

A shore battery fired on Shannon, killing some men. When it was clear that Shannon could not be gotten off, her captain surrendered. The French army then took the officers and men prisoners. Some French fishing boats took possession of Shannon but saw that her hull was so damaged that she would be impossible to refloat.

Merlin stood back into shore on the 16th and at 11.30am dispatched two boats of marines and sailors to destroy Shannon to prevent the French from salvaging her guns and stores. Despite heavy fire from the island's batteries the boarders were able to burn and destroy the frigate without suffering a single casualty. (Note: Troude states that the burning of Shannon occurred in the night of 16 December, while salvaging operations were proceeding.)

Later in December, Merlin and Pluto detained Traveller, Hall, master, which was sailing from Alexandria to Havre. They sent Traveller into Portsmouth.

On 25 May 1804 Merlin was part of a squadron of six vessels that captured Matilda.

In July and August Merlin participated in the squadron under Captain Robert Dudley Oliver in Melpomene at the bombardment of French vessels at Le Havre. The bomb vessels' shells and carcasses set the town on fire on 23 July. Merlin was one of only two British vessels that suffered hits from enemy fire and there were no British casualties. On 1 August, the vessels kept a continuous fire for three hours. Still, it is not clear that the bombardment did much damage to the French flotilla. On 22 July Merlin captured the Shepherdess, and on 31 July Merlin and the squadron capture the French vessel Papillon. Merlin also shared in the capture, on 15 September, of the Flora de Lisboa, off Havre.

Commander Robert Forbes replaced Brenton in January 1805. Merlin was in company with Champion , Cracker, and the hired armed cutters Frances and Nelson on 16 April at the capture of the Charlotte Christina. Merlin shared with Eurydice and Prevoyante in the proceeds from the capture on 11 June of the Prussian ship Edward. The proceeds were forwarded from Gibraltar.

In an enclosure to a letter dated 7 October 1805, Admiral Lord Nelson wrote, "Jalouse, Childers, and Merlin being unfit for the service of this Country, are ordered home with the first Convoy to be repaired".

Still, by March 1806 Merlin was in the West Indies, and under the command of Commander William Standway Parkinson. On 26 April Merlin escorted 16 vessels from Barbadoes to Demerara, Surinam, and Berbice.

Commander William Fisher replaced Parkinson on 25 February 1807.

By April 1807 Merlin was laid up. The navy paid her off in June at Portsmouth.

== Fate ==
In October 1810 the Navy had Merlin fitted as a receiving ship at Portsmouth.

The "Commissioners for executing the office of Lord High Admiral" offered the Merlin sloop, of 395 tons (bm), lying at Portsmouth, for sale on 21 January 1836. The Commissioners sold her on that day for £510.
