= Minerva-class frigate =

1778 series of ships

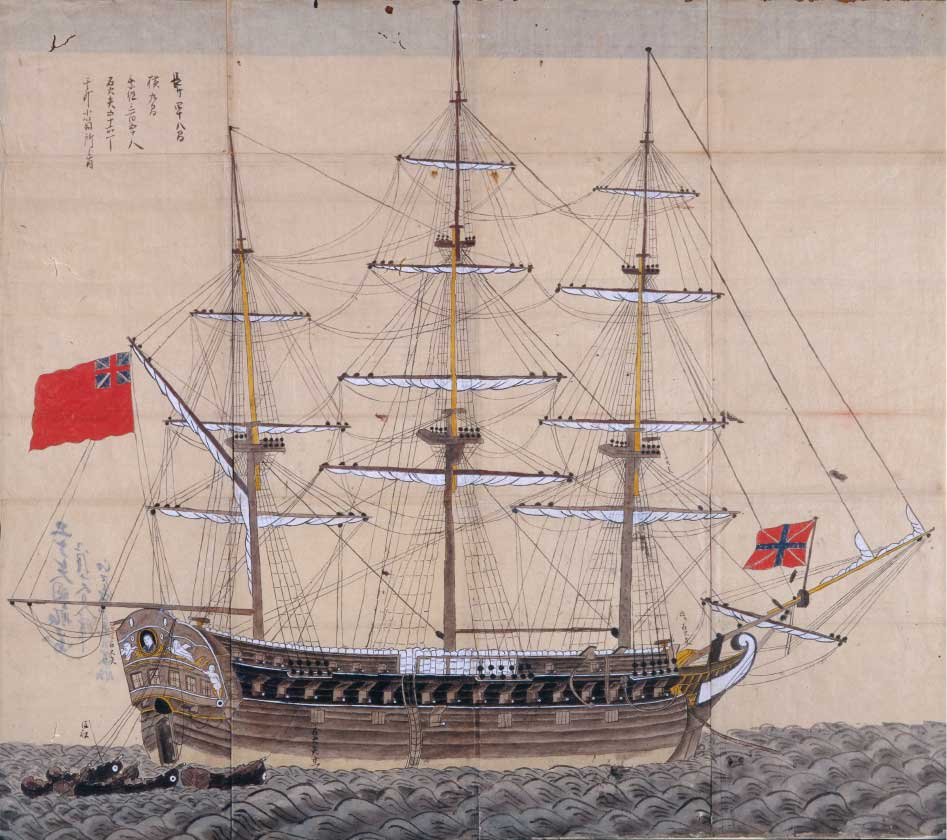
- Japanese drawing of the Phaeton

Class overview
- Operators: Royal Navy
- Built: 1778–1782
- In commission: 1780–1828
- Completed: 4

General characteristics
- Type: Frigate
- Tons burthen: 938 72/94
- Length: 141 ft (43 m)
- Beam: 38 ft 10 in (11.84 m)
- Depth of hold: 13 ft 10 in (4.22 m)
- Propulsion: Sail
- Complement: 270 (raised to 280, 25 April 1780)
- Armament: UD: 28 × 18-pounder guns; QD: 8 × 6-pounder guns; FC: 2 × 6-pounder guns

The Minerva-class sailing frigates were a series of four ships built to a 1778 design by Sir Edward Hunt, which served in the Royal Navy during the latter decades of the eighteenth century.

During the early stages of the American Revolutionary War, the Royal Navy – while well supplied with ships from earlier programs, but faced with coastal operations and trade protection tasks along the American littoral – ordered numerous forty-four gun, two-decked ships and thirty-two gun 12-pounder armed frigates. Anticipating the entry of European powers into the war, and with renewed resistance provided by the large, nine hundred ton, thirty-two gun 12-pounder armed frigates of the French Navy, the RN looked to a newer larger design of frigate to meet this challenge. From November 1778 larger frigates with a heavier 18-pounder primary armament were ordered.

They were the first Royal Navy frigates designed to be armed with the eighteen-pounder cannon on their upper deck, the main gun deck of a frigate. Before coming into service, their designed secondary armament was augmented, with 9-pounder guns being substituted for the 6-pounder guns originally planned, and with ten 18-pounder carronades being added (six on the quarterdeck and four on the forecastle). The type eventually proved successful, and went on to be virtually the standard frigate type during the latter periods of the age of sail.

== Ships in class ==
- HMS Minerva
  - Builder: Woolwich Dockyard
  - Ordered: 6 November 1778
  - Laid down: November 1778
  - Launched: 3 June 1780
  - Completed: 6 July 1780
  - Fate: Fitted as a troopship and renamed Pallas 29 May 1798; broken up March 1803 at Chatham Dockyard.
- HMS Arethusa
  - Builder: James Martin Hilhouse, Bristol
  - Ordered: 26 January 1779
  - Laid down: 23 August 1779
  - Launched: 10 April 1781
  - Fate: Broken up May 1815 at Sheerness Dockyard.
- HMS Phaeton
  - Builder: John Smallshaw, Liverpool.
  - Ordered: 3 March 1780
  - Laid down: June 1780
  - Launched: 12 June 1782
  - Completed: 27 December 1782 at Plymouth Dockyard.
  - Fate: Sold to break up 26 March 1828
- HMS Thetis
  - Builder: John Randall, Rotherhithe.
  - Ordered: 22 September 1781
  - Laid down: December 1781
  - Launched: 23 September 1782
  - Completed: 15 November 1782 at Deptford Dockyard.
  - Fate: Sold 9 June 1814 at Chatham Dockyard.
