= French frigate Résolue (1778) =

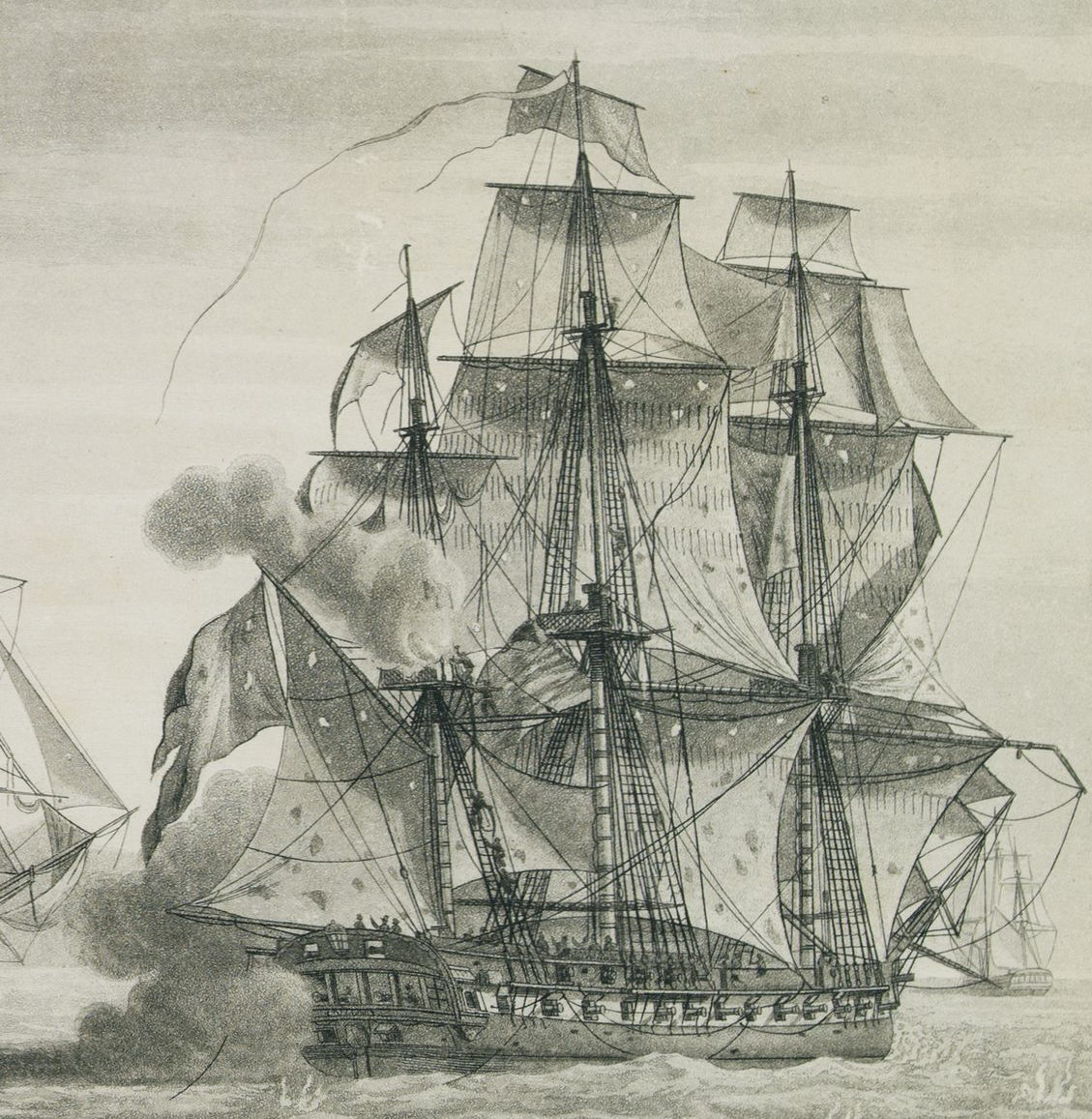
- Bellone, Résolue's sister ship

History

France
- Name: Résolue
- Namesake: Resolute
- Builder: Lemarchand, Saint Malo; plans by Léon-Michel Guignace
- Laid down: April 1777 as No. 1
- Launched: 16 March 1778
- In service: April 1778
- Captured: 14 October 1798

Great Britain
- Name: Resolue
- Acquired: 14 October 1798
- Fate: Hulk in Plymouth; Broken up 1811

General characteristics
- Class & type: Iphigénie-class frigate
- Displacement: 1,150 tonneaux
- Tons burthen: 620 port tonneaux; 877 27/94 (bm)
- Length: 140 ft 2 in (42.7 m) (overall); 116 ft 3 in (35.4 m) (keel)
- Beam: 37 ft 8 in (11.5 m)
- Draught: 4.9 m (16 ft) (unladen)
- Depth of hold: 11 ft 9 1/2 in (3.6 m)
- Sail plan: Full-rigged ship
- Complement: French service:270-290; British service:54 (as receiving ship)
- Armament: French service: 26 × 12-pounder guns + 6 × 6-pounder guns; between 1793 and 1795 she also had 2 × 36-pounder obusiers, and between 1796 and 1798 she also had 4 × 36-pounder obusiers; British service:28 × 18-pounder guns + 4 × 6-pounder guns

Résolue was a 32-gun Iphigénie-class frigate of the French Navy. The British captured her twice, once in November 1791 during peacetime, and again in 1798. The Royal Navy hulked her in 1799 and she was broken up in 1811.

== French service ==
In 1778, Résolue was part of the squadron under Orvilliers, with Pontevs Gien as captain and Rochegude as first officer.

In January 1779, Résolue was part of a squadron under Admiral Vaudreuil that captured Fort St Louis in Senegal from the British in February. The troops were under the command of the Duc de Lauzun. In September she was at Martinique undergoing repairs and refitting.

In April 1781 Résolue was at Brest, being coppered. At that point, Lieutenant Fleuriot de Langle was given command.

On 15 July 1781, after having cruised for 50 days, the French 32-gun frigates Friponne, Lieutenant le Chevalier de Blachon, and Résolue captured Speedy, Swift, the four merchant vessels Spy, Adventure, Peggy, and Success, and the 10-gun privateer Queen. The British ships were on their way to the Windward Islands. (Note: Some reports give the date of capture as 11 August. However, that was the date of a letter by le Chevalier de Blanchon announcing the captures, which the Ipswich Journal published.)

Speedy, Captain Spargo, and Swift, both of 16 guns and 80 men, were Post Office packet boats. They were carrying despatches for Barbadoes, St Lucia, Antigua, and Jamaica. Speedy, which had left Falmouth on 18 June, was the packet that the government was expecting to arrive in Britain with the news of the departure of the homeward-bound fleet from Jamaica. The French took Speedy and Swift into Martinique, and the rest of the prizes into Guadeloupe. At Martinique the French Navy took Speedy into service. On 6 December, however, the British recaptured Speedy off Barbados.

In 1783 Résolue was again at Brest for repairs.

In early 1791, she was under the command of Jacques Trublet de Villejégu.

In November 1791, Résolue was escorting merchant ships, when HMS Phoenix and HMS Perseverance captured her at the Battle of Tellicherry. Résolue suffered 25 men killed and 40 wounded. As this occurred during peacetime, the British restored her to France at Mahé. In 1793 she was at Brest being repaired.

She took part in the action of 23 April 1794, when a squadron comprising Résolue, Engageante, Pomone and the 22-gun corvette Babet met a squadron of five British heavy frigates. Résolue managed to escape but the British took the other three ships.

Résolue, under Commander Montalan, next participated in the Expédition d'Irlande. On 22 December 1796, she collided with Redoutable in Bantry Bay, losing her mast in the accident. She sent a boat to seek help from Immortalité, but it was washed up on the shore on Clough Beach and its crew taken prisoner. The boat is now a local attraction. Résolue managed to return to Brest under emergency rigging and in tow from Pégase.

== Capture ==
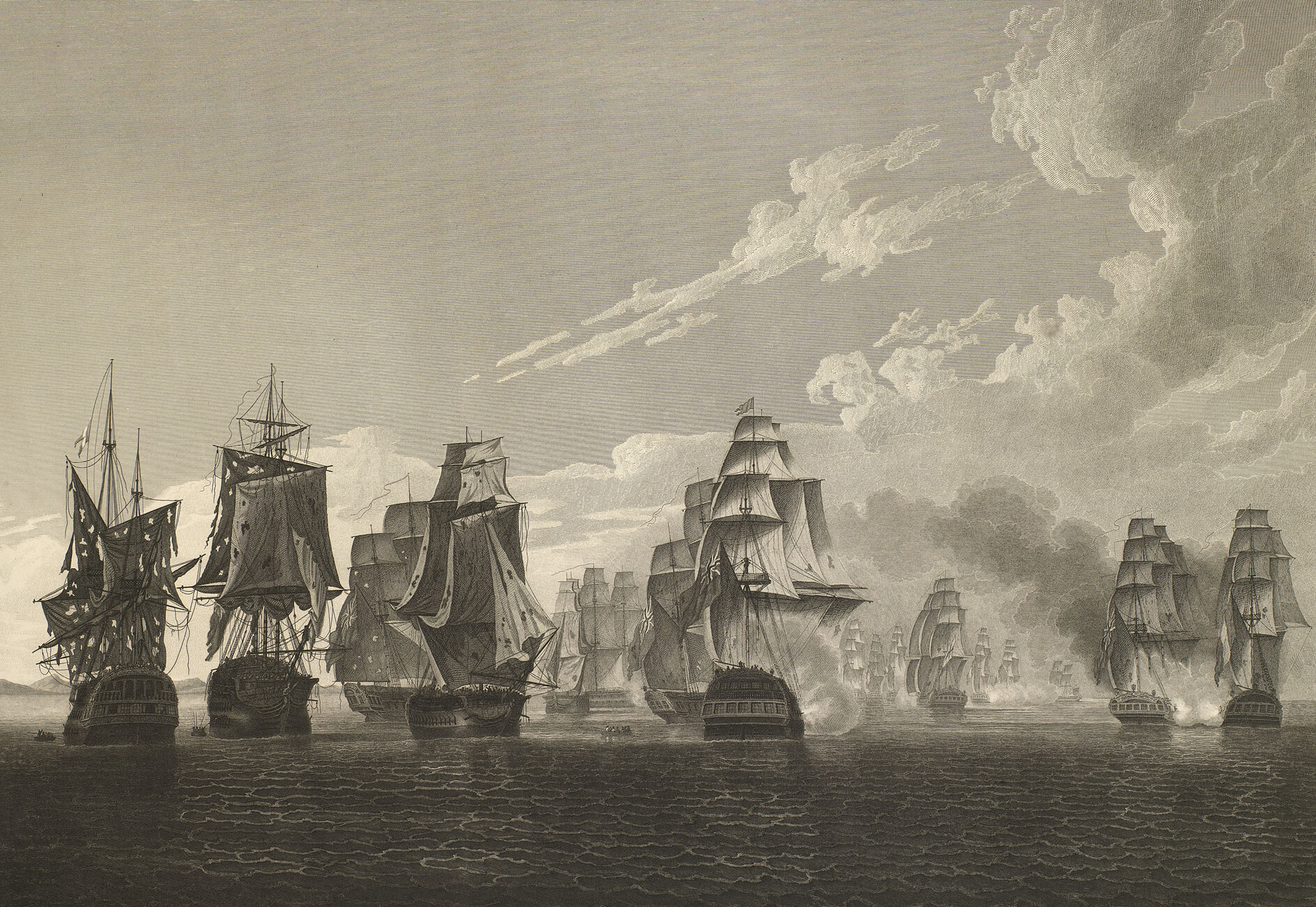
Résolue at the Battle of Tory Island

HMS Melampus captured Résolue on 14 October 1798 at the Battle of Tory Island. Résolue was fitted with hanging ports to her main deck. To meet a coming storm, her crew had run in and double-breeched her 12-pounders, and shut and barred the ports. She was, therefore, in a comparatively defenseless state with only her quarterdeck guns able to respond to Melampus's broadsides. Before she struck her colours, Résolue lost ten men killed and had some wounded, out of about 500 men on board.

== British career ==
She was purchased for the Royal Navy as HMS Resolue but never saw active service, instead being hulked in 1799 at Plymouth. Resolue was commissioned under Lieutenant D. Wynter in November 1801. His replacement was Lieutenant T. Richards. She was in ordinary in 1802. She was again commissioned, in April 1803, under Lieutenant J.H. Nicols, as a slop ship. In 1807 she served as flagship for Admiral John Sutton. In 1809 she was a receiving ship. As late as 1810 she did have men aboard, including some African-Americans impressed into service, who wrote letters attempting to secure their release.

== Fate ==
Resolue was broken up on 10 August 1811.
