= HMS Aeolus (1801) =

Frigate of the Royal Navy

History

United Kingdom
- Name: HMS Aeolus
- Ordered: 28 January 1800
- Builder: Mrs Frances Barnard, Deptford
- Laid down: April 1800
- Launched: 28 February 1801
- Completed: By 10 April 1801
- Honours and awards: Naval General Service Medal with clasps; 4 Novr. 1805; Martinique
- Fate: Broken up in October 1817

General characteristics
- Class & type: 32-gun Amphion-class fifth-rate frigate
- Tons burthen: 91876/94 (bm)
- Length: 144 ft 3 in (44.0 m) (overall); 121 ft 9 in (37.1 m) (keel)
- Beam: 37 ft 8 in (11.5 m)
- Depth of hold: 12 ft 6 in (3.8 m)
- Propulsion: Sails
- Sail plan: Full-rigged ship
- Complement: 254
- Armament: Upper deck: 26 × 18-pounder guns; QD: 2 × 6-pounder guns + 8 × 24-pounder carronades; Fc: 2 × 6-pounder guns + 2 × 24-pounder carronades

HMS Aeolus was a 32-gun Amphion-class fifth-rate frigate of the Royal Navy. She was launched in 1801 and served in the French Revolutionary and Napoleonic Wars, and the War of 1812.

Ordered during the last years of the French Revolutionary Wars, Aeolus was at first engaged in convoy work, before being sent out to the West Indies, where she took part in operations off Saint-Domingue and blockaded the French ships in the harbours. She was involved in the chase of the 74-gun Duquesne after she put to sea, and assisted in her capture. Aeolus returned to operate off the British coast, and was part of Sir Richard Strachan's squadron in late 1805. The squadron encountered part of the fleeing Franco-Spanish fleet that Nelson had decisively defeated two weeks previously at the Battle of Trafalgar, and after bringing them to battle, captured the entire force.

After spending time off Ireland and North America, Aeolus was in the Caribbean in 1809, and took part in the capture of Martinique. Deployed with Captain Philip Broke's squadron after the outbreak of the War of 1812 Aeolus took part in the capture of USS Nautilus, the first ship either side lost in the war, the pursuit of USS Constitution and the capture of the American privateer Snapper. Aeolus was used as a storeship at Quebec after the end of the war, and after returning to Britain was laid up as the Napoleonic Wars drew to a close. She was finally sold in 1817.

== Construction and commissioning ==
Aeolus was ordered on 28 January 1800 from the yards of Mrs Frances Barnard, of Deptford, and built to a design by Sir William Rule. She was laid down in April 1800 and launched on 28 February 1801. Aeolus commissioned under her first commander, Captain John Spranger in March 1801.

She was the third ship in the Navy to be named Aeolus. The first, also a 32-gun fifth rate (launched in 1758), was still in existence but had been reduced to harbour service in 1796 and renamed Guernsey in 1800 to free the name for the new ship. Then a squadron captured the French frigate Pallas, which received the name Aeolus. In the meantime, Guernsey was sold in May 1801, shortly after the third Aeolus had completed fitting out the previous month, at Deptford Dockyard. The second Aeolus was then renamed to Pique.

== Career ==
=== West Indies ===
Aeolus was at first employed on convoy duties and sailed to Jamaica in January 1802. In August she was briefly under the command of Lieutenant Henry Whitby, in an acting capacity, but Spranger was not superseded until Captain Andrew Evans took over in May 1803.

On 1 February 1804 she captured the American snow Antelope, of 155 tons. Antelope had a crew of eight men and was carrying provisions, dry goods, wine, staves, hoops and sundries. In May 1804 Lord William FitzRoy assumed command.

Aeolus joined Commodore John Loring's squadron off Saint-Domingue following the defeat of the French forces there, and still serving with Loring, took part in the capture of the French 74-gun Duquesne off Saint-Domingue on 25 July 1804. The French ship, under Commodore Quérangal, had been trapped at Cape Francois by a British blockade, along with the 74-gun Duguay-Trouin, under Captain Claude Touffet, and the 40-gun Guerriere, under Captain Beaudouin. The squadron escaped to sea under cover of squalls on the afternoon of 24 July, and split up, Duguay-Trouin and Guerriere heading east pursued by Captain George Dundas in HMS Elephant, and Duquesne heading west followed by Loring in HMS Bellerophon and accompanied by HMS Aeolus and HMS Tartar. HMS Theseus and HMS Vanguard soon joined the chase. Duquesne, unable to escape, struck her colours to Captain James Walker of Vanguard.

=== Cape Ortegal ===
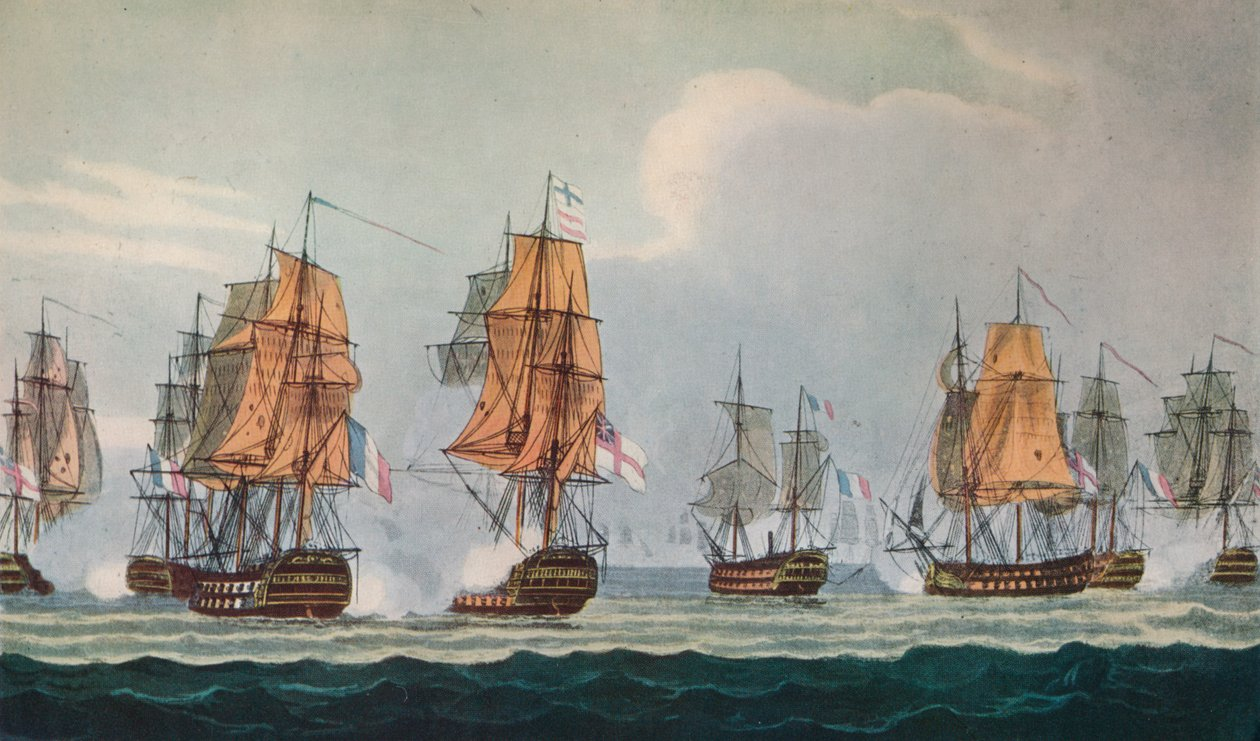
The Battle of Cape Ortegal by Thomas Whitcombe

Aeolus was then assigned to operate in the English Channel. By late 1805 she was part of Captain Sir Richard Strachan's squadron patrolling in Bay of Biscay. Strachan, with his pennant aboard the 80-gun Caesar, had the 74-gun ships Hero, Courageux, Namur and Bellona, the 36-gun Santa Margarita and Aeolus. They were searching for a French squadron under Zacharie Allemand which was known to be cruising in the Atlantic, when they were joined late on 3 November by the 36-gun HMS Phoenix, under Captain Thomas Baker. Baker reported that he had just escaped from a French squadron of four large ships, and Strachan immediately set off in pursuit. Though they were thought to be part of Allemand's squadron, they were in fact four ships which had escaped the Battle of Trafalgar under Rear-Admiral Pierre Dumanoir le Pelley, and were now hurrying north to reach Rochefort.

On realising that he had encountered a superior British force, Pelley attempted to flee northwards, but his ships were steadily overhauled by the British, with Strachan sending the faster frigates on to wear down the rear-most ships. Aeolus joined them in attacking the Scipion, and as the ships of the line came up and Pelley came about to engage them, the frigates formed up on the Frenchmen's starboard side, doubling their line. The French were worn down and all four ships were forced to surrender. Aeolus had no men killed during the engagement, and only three wounded. In 1847 the Admiralty issued the Naval General Service Medal with clasp "4 Novr. 1805" to all surviving claimants from the action.

== Irish station and America ==
Aeolus spent the rest of 1805 and 1806 on the Irish station, before departing for Halifax in August 1807. She was then in the Caribbean, taking part in the capture of Martinique in February 1809. She formed part of a small squadron with HMS Cleopatra and the brig HMS Recruit, which was sent into Fort-de-France Bay on 5 February. Panicked by the advance the French militia defending the bay set fire to the ships anchored there, including the frigate Amphitrite, and abandoned the forts in the southern part of the island. In 1847 the Admiralty awarded the Naval General Service Medal with clasp "Martinique" to all surviving claimants from the campaign.

After five years in command of Aeolus Fitzroy handed over command to Captain John Shortland in October 1809. Captain Lord James Townshend succeeded Shortland in December 1810. Serving aboard Aeolus in 1811 was Frederick Marryat, who would later become famous as an author.

== War of 1812 ==
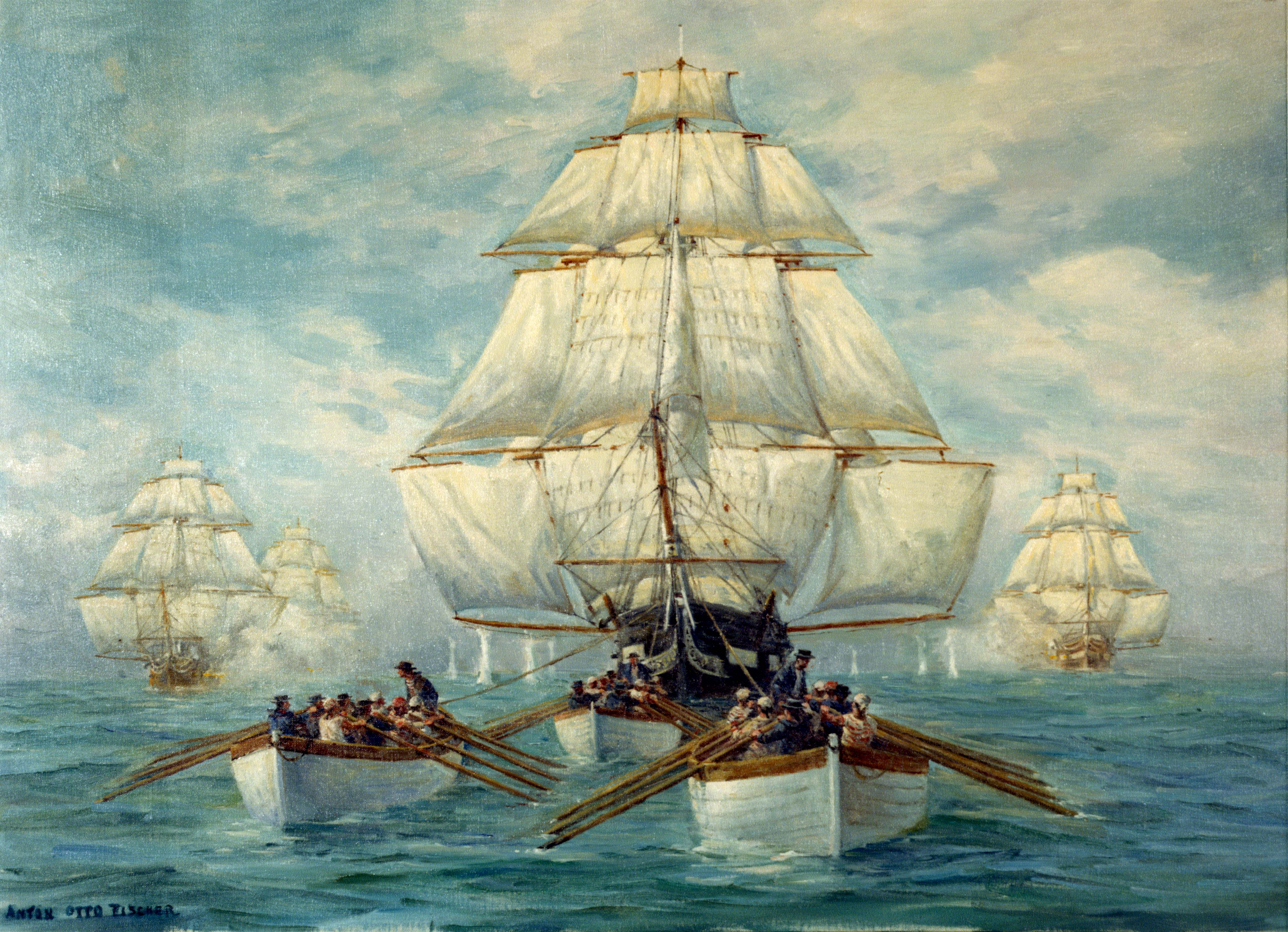
The British squadron, including Aeolus, pursue USS Constitution in July 1812

With the outbreak of the War of 1812 Aeolus was sent to join Captain Philip Broke's squadron in July 1812, and was present at the capture of the 14-gun USS Nautilus on 15 July. The British squadron, consisting of Aeolus, the 64-gun HMS Africa under Captain John Bastard, Broke's 38-gun HMS Shannon, the 38-gun HMS Guerriere under Captain James Richard Dacres and the 36-gun HMS Belvidera under Captain Richard Byron, had arrived off New York City in search of USS President, then under Commodore John Rodgers, but she had already sailed.

Instead, the British found the Nautilus, under William M. Crane. Nautilus was unable to outrun the British squadron and surrendered, becoming the first ship either side lost during the war. Shortly afterwards the squadron fell in with USS Constitution and chased her for three days, with the American ship resorting to throwing her water and stores overboard, and having the ship towed and kedged, before she finally managed to escape.

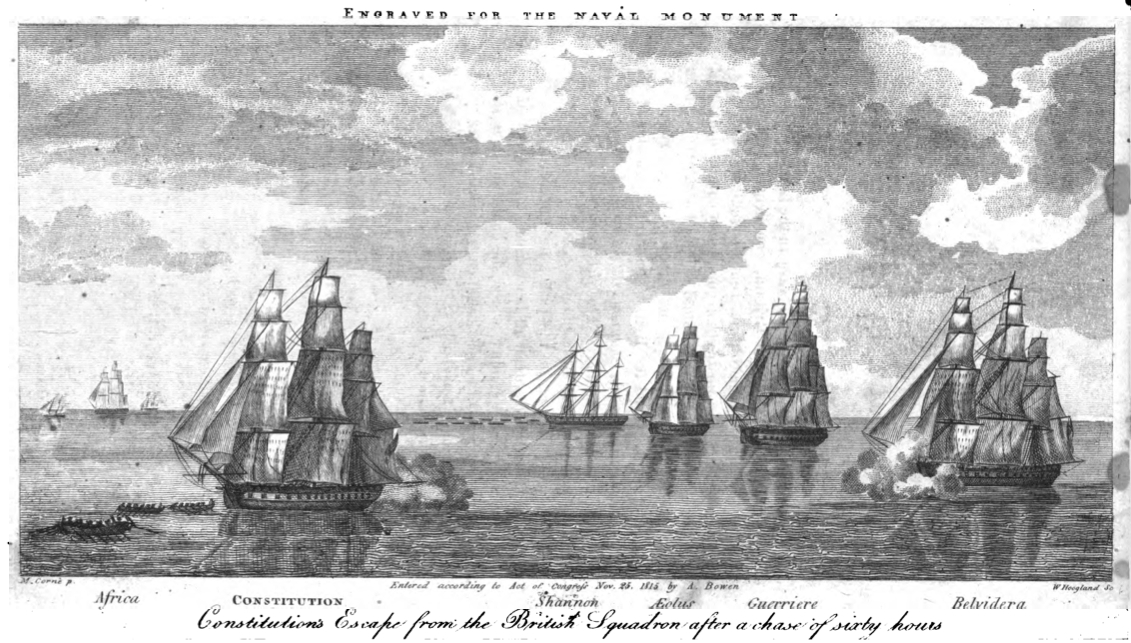
A contemporary engraving of the escape, showing from R to L, Africa, Constitution, Shannon, Aeolus, Guerrière, and Belvidera.

On 3 November 1812 Aeolus, acting in company with HMS Acasta, HMS Maidstone and HMS Childers captured the American privateer Snapper. Snapper, of 172 or 200 tons (accounts vary), was out of Philadelphia and was armed with ten guns. The American press reported that before she struck she took 800 shots to her hulls and sails.

On 7 August 1812 Aeolus captured and burnt the American ship Pomona. Pomona had been sailing from Liverpool to an American port.

Between February and March 1813, Aeolus captured several American merchant ships, and one Spaniard, that she sent in to Bermuda:

- Resolution, carrying molasses (5 February);
- Eliza, carrying cotton (10 February);
- Rose, carrying cotton and logwood (10 February);
- Jacob Getting, carrying rice and corn (18 February; in company with Sophie;
- Elizabeth, carrying cotton (24 February; with Sophie);
- Federal Jack, carrying lighthouses (2 March; with Sophie); and the Spanish ship
- Anna carrying flour and bread (9 March; with Sophie).

At some point after these captures command of Aeolus passed to Captain Joseph Popham in 1813, and he was succeeded in an acting capacity by Commander James Crighton the following year.

== Fate ==
Aelous was sent to Quebec to serve as a storeship, and returned to Britain to be laid up at Woolwich in August 1814. She was moved to Deptford in June 1816, and was broken up there in October 1817.
