= French ship Formidable (1795) =

Ship of the line of the French Navy

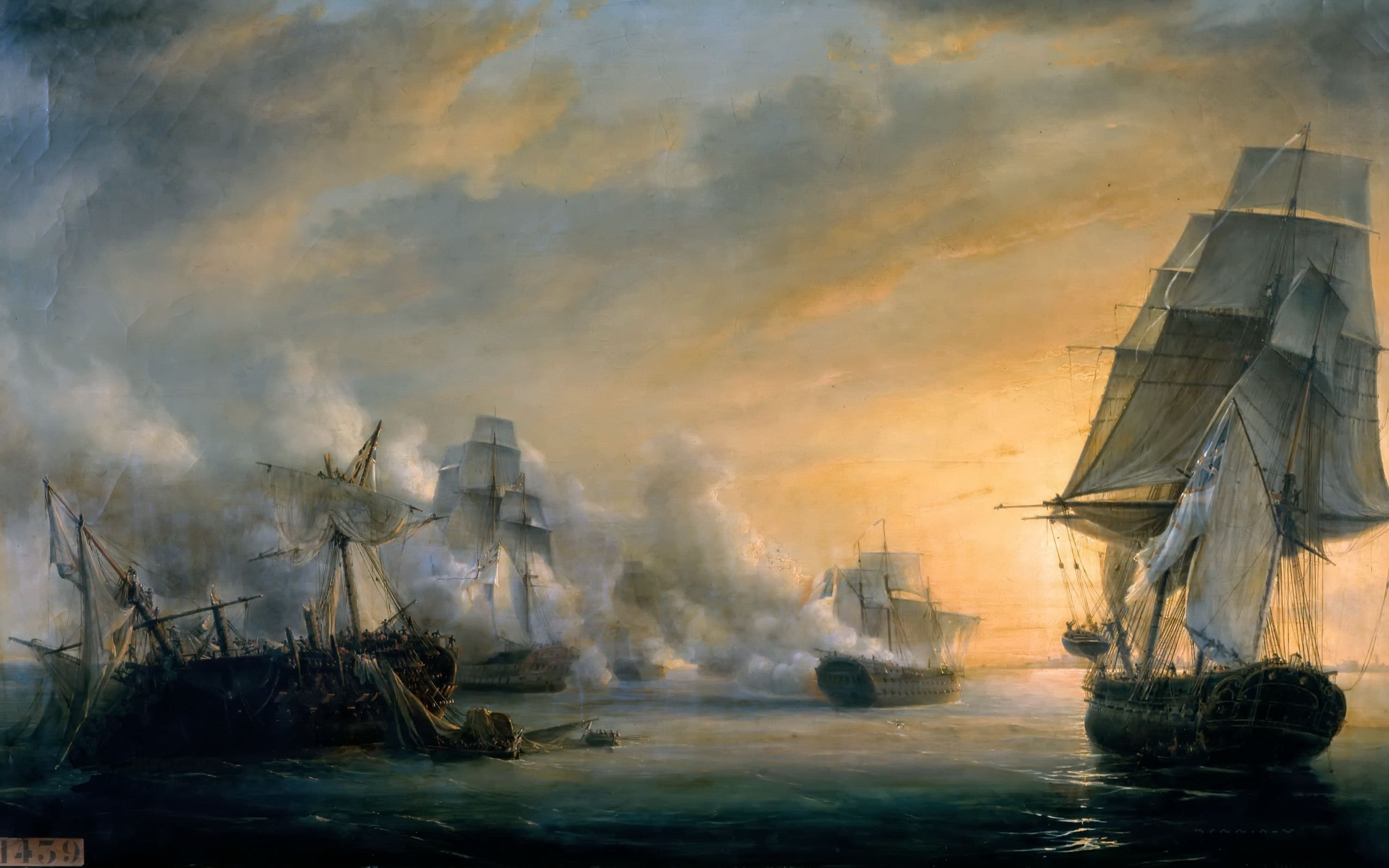
- Formidable (second from right) at the Second Battle of Algeciras

History

France
- Name: Formidable
- Builder: Toulon
- Laid down: August 1794
- Launched: 17 March 1795
- In service: 27 October 1795
- Renamed: Renamed Figuieres on 4 December 1794 but reverted to Formidable on 31 May 1795
- Captured: 4 November 1805

United Kingdom
- Name: Brave
- Namesake: Bravery
- Acquired: 4 November 1805
- Fate: Broken up in April 1816

General characteristics
- Class & type: 80-gun Tonnant-class ship of the line
- Displacement: 3,868 tonneaux
- Tons burthen: 2,034 port tonneaux; 2,248 55/94 bm
- Length: 194 ft 6 in (59.28 m) (gundeck); 159 ft 7.75 in (48.6601 m) (keel)
- Beam: 51 ft 5.5 in (15.685 m)
- Depth of hold: 21 ft 6 in (6.55 m)
- Sail plan: Full-rigged ship
- Complement: 690
- Armament: French service: 30 × 36-pounder long guns; 32 × 24-pounder long guns; 18 × 12-pounder long guns; 4 × obusiers de vaisseau; British service: Lower deck: 32 × 32-pounder guns; Upper deck: 30 × 18-pounder guns; Quarterdeck: 2 × 12-pounder guns + 14 × 32-pounder carronades; Forecastle: 2 × 12-pounder guns + 4 × 32-pounder carronades

Formidable was an 80-gun Tonnant-class ship of the line of the French Navy, laid down in August 1794 and given the name Formidable, on 5 October, but renamed Figuieres on 4 December 1794, although the name was restored to Formidable on 31 May 1795 after she was launched at Toulon on 17 March 1795. She participated in the Battle of Algeciras, the Battle of Cape Finisterre and several other actions before the British captured her at the Battle of Cape Ortegal on 4 November 1805. The British took her into service as HMS Brave. She was sold to be broken up in April 1816.

== French service ==
On 6 July 1801 she fought in the Battle of Algeciras under Captain Landais Lalonde, who was killed in the action. Command then transferred to capitaine de frégate Amable Troude, formerly second in command of Dessaix.

On 13 July, as she sailed isolated behind the French fleet, she was chased by the frigate HMS Thames and the ships of the line HMS Venerable (74), HMS Caesar (80) and HMS Superb (74). She allowed Venerable catch up and took her under heavy fire, leaving her dismasted and in danger of sinking. The rest of the British squadron had to come to aid Venerable, allowing Formidable to escape to Cádiz, acclaimed by the population. Troude was immediately promoted to capitaine de vaisseau. Bonaparte later met with him and called him "the French Horatius".

In 1802 and 1803, Formidable served in Toulon under Admiral Latouche Tréville.

On 17 January 1805 she went to sea under Admiral Villeneuve, together with ten other ships of the line and eight frigates, and on 20 January the fleet sailed for Martinique in the Caribbean Sea, which it reached on 13 May. The fleet captured Diamond Rock from the British, but Villeneuve returned to Europe on hearing that Horatio Nelson had arrived in the West Indies.

On 22 June 1805, the returning Franco-Spanish fleet was intercepted by a British fleet under Sir Robert Calder, resulting in the Battle of Cape Finisterre. After a violent artillery exchange and the capture of two of the Spanish ships, the fleets were separated in the fog. Exhausted after six months at sea, the fleet anchored in Cádiz to rest and refit. With his command under question and planning to meet the British fleet to gain a decisive victory, Villeneuve left Cádiz and met the British fleet near Cape Trafalgar.

Formidable was the flagship of Rear-Admiral Pierre Dumanoir le Pelley, who commanded the six-ship vanguard of the French fleet, along with Formidable, Scipion, Duguay-Trouin, Mont Blanc, Intrépide and Neptune. The vanguard was kept as a reserve, and joined the battle around 16:00. They only sailed close to the battle and fired a few shots.

On 4 November 1805 at the Battle of Cape Ortegal, Admiral Sir Richard Strachan, with Caesar, Hero, Courageux, Namur and four frigates, defeated and captured what remained of the squadron. Formidable was taken and commissioned in the Royal Navy as HMS Brave.

== Fate ==
"Brave" was used as a prison hulk at Plymouth for the remainder of the war. Brave was broken up in 1816.
