= French ship Mont Blanc (1793) =

Ship of the line of the French Navy

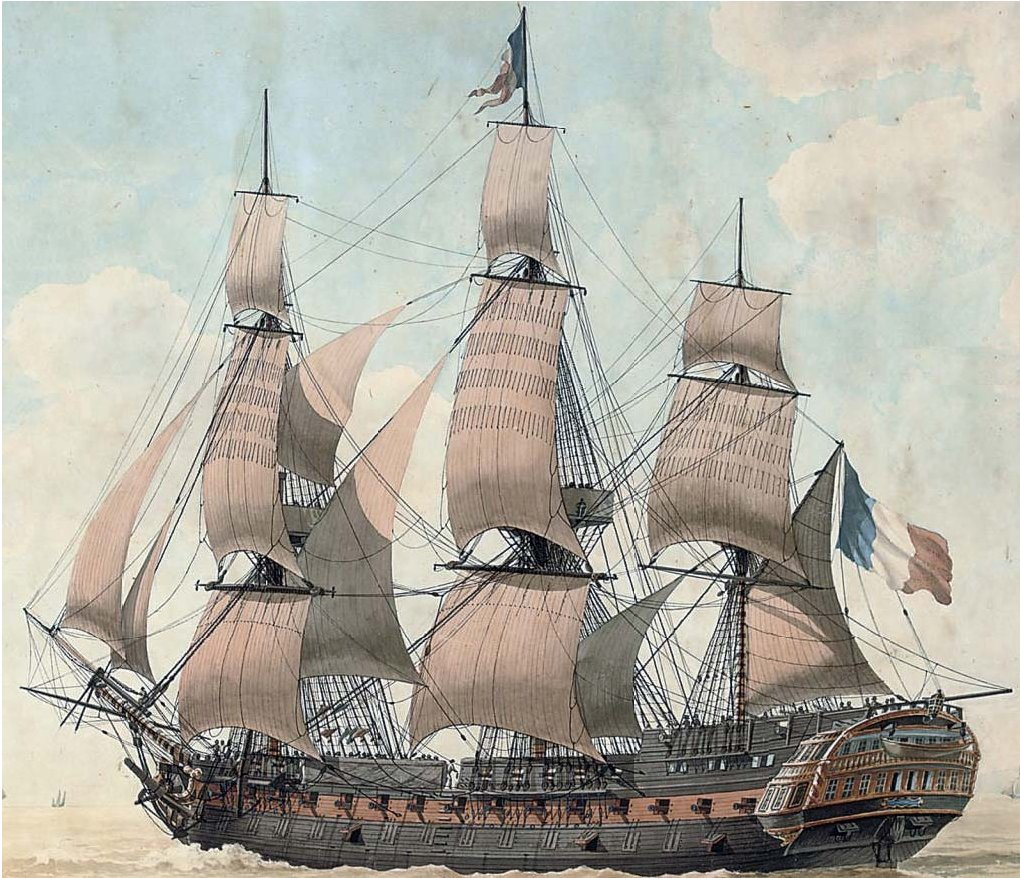
- The Mont Blanc off Marseille (detail of this image), by Antoine Roux.

History

France
- Name: Pyrrhus
- Namesake: Pyrrhus of Epirus; Mont Blanc; Days of 31 May and 2 June 1793
- Builder: Rochefort
- Laid down: July 1789
- Launched: 13 August 1791
- Completed: March 1793
- Renamed: Mont Blanc on 7 January 1793; Trente-et-un Mai on 7 April 1794; Républicain on 18 April 1795; Mont Blanc on 4 January 1796
- Captured: 4 November 1805

United Kingdom
- Name: Mont Blanc
- Acquired: by capture, 4 November 1805
- Fate: Gunpowder hulk from 1811; Sold in 1819

General characteristics
- Class & type: Téméraire-class ship of the line
- Displacement: 3,069 tonneaux
- Tons burthen: 1,537 port tonneaux
- Length: 55.87 metres (183.3 ft) (172 pied)
- Beam: 14.90 metres (48 ft 11 in)
- Draught: 7.26 metres (23.8 ft) (22 pied)
- Propulsion: Up to 2,485 m^{2} (26,750 sq ft) of sails
- Armament: 74 guns: Lower gundeck: 28 × 36-pounder long guns; Upper gundeck: 30 × 18-pounder long guns; Forecastle and Quarter deck: 16 × 8-pounder long guns; 4 × 36-pounder carronades
- Armour: Timber

Mont Blanc was a 74-gun Téméraire-class ship of the line built for the French Navy during the 1790s. In the course of her career, she was renamed no less than four times, reflecting the tides of politics with the French Revolution.

During the Wars of the First and Second Coalitions, Mont Blanc took part in the last actions of the Glorious First of June, in the Croisière du Grand Hiver, in the Battle of Hyères Islands and in Bruix' expedition of 1799; after peace was restored in the Treaty of Lunéville, she served during the Saint-Domingue expedition.

Mont Blanc took part of the vanguard of the French fleet the Battle of Trafalgar on 21 October 1805, and consequently saw little action as this division was cut off from the battle. The squadron was destroyed during the Battle of Cape Ortegal on 4 November 1805, where Mont Blanc was captured. She was recommissioned in the Royal Navy but never saw action again.

== Career ==
She was built at Rochefort as Pyrrhus in 1791. She was renamed Mont Blanc in 1793 before being renamed Trente-et-un Mai in 1794. Under that name she fought at the Glorious First of June in 1794 under Captain Honoré Joseph Antoine Ganteaume. She took part in the Croisière du Grand Hiver, where she rescued the crew of the sinking Scipion. In 1795 she was renamed Républicain, taking part in the Battle of Hyères Islands, and Ganteaume's expedition of 1795, and then became Mont Blanc again in 1796. She took part in Bruix' expedition of 1799 under Captain Esprit-Tranquille Maistral. In 1802 she took part in the Saint-Domingue expedition under Charles René Magon de Médine.

She was one of the ships of Rear-Admiral Lepelley at the Battle of Trafalgar on 21 October 1805. Dumanoir commanded the six ship vanguard of the French fleet, with Formidable, Scipion, Duguay-Trouin, Mont Blanc, Intrépide and Neptune. Horatio Nelson's attacks left these ships downwind of the main confrontation and Dumanoir did not immediately obey Pierre-Charles Villeneuve's orders to return to the battle. When the ships did turn back, most of them only exchanged a few shots before retiring.

On 4 November 1805, Admiral Sir Richard Strachan, with HMS Caesar, Hero, Courageux, Namur and four frigates, defeated and captured what remained of the squadron at the Battle of Cape Ortegal. Mont Blanc was taken and commissioned in the Royal Navy as HMS Mont Blanc. She was used as a gunpowder hulk from 1811, and was sold in 1819.
