= Charles Berrenger =

French Navy officer

Captain Charles Berrenger (Grémonville, 24 June 1757 - Toulon, 17 November 1814) was a French Navy officer.

== Biography ==
Berrenger started sailing in 1775, alternating between merchantmen, ships of the French Royal Navy and privateers. In 1780, he was second lieutenant on a privateer, and was admitted in the Navy as an auxiliary frigate lieutenant the next year.

Serving on the aviso Chien de chasse, he took part in a fight against a British corvette.

Returned to France in 1784, Berrenger obtained a licence of merchantman captain. In 1787, he obtained a commission of sub-lieutenant in the Navy, but stayed with the merchant navy.

In 1792, he joined the Navy and was given command of a gunboat at Le Havre. The next year, he captained the corvette Suffisante. Promoted to lieutenant in 1794, he was awarded command of the brand new Sirène in September 1795. In March 1796, he was promoted to commander. He took part in the Expédition d'Irlande, and to various missions in Santo Domingo.

Berrenger was promoted to captain in 1799 and appointed to command the Républicain. In 1800, he moved to Redoutable, and to Jean-Jacques Rousseau the next year.

In 1802, he was transferred to Scipion, serving in the Mediterranean under admiral Leissègues, and in Villeneuve's fleet from 1805. He took part in the Battle of Cape Finisterre, and fought at the Battle of Trafalgar under Vice Admiral Pierre Dumanoir le Pelley.

He managed to escape the battle, but fell upon Admiral Sir Richard Strachan's squadron on 4 November 1805, leading to the Battle of Cape Ortegal. Berrenger sustained a serious injury at the leg, and the French ships had to strike their colours.

Released and returned to France, Berrenger commanded the Aréthuse and the Majesteux.

== Honours ==
- Officer in the Legion of honour
- Knight of the Order of Saint Louis

== Sources and references ==
- Dictionnaire des capitaines de vaisseau de Napoléon, Danielle & Bernard Quintin, SPM, 2003, ISBN 2-901952-42-9
