= Guillaume-Jean-Noël de Lavillegris =

Guillaume-Jean-Noël de Lavillegris (Saint-Malo, 20 July 1752 – Paris, 21 January 1807) was a French Navy officer.

== Biography ==
Lavillegris was born to a captain of the French East India Company. He started sailing with the Company in 1767 and rose to captain. In 1779, he joined the Navy as a reserve officer, taking part in the naval operations in the American Revolutionary War.

In 1792, he was made a lieutenant and appointed to command the frigate Précieuse. In March 1794, he was promoted to captain, and given command of the Achille; he took part in the Glorious First of June, where Achille was captured and he was taken prisoner.

In 1797, Lavillegris was promoted to commodore and appointed to the Quatorze Juillet, which was being completed. Quatorze Juillet burnt in an accident before her commissioning, and Lavillegris was suspended for not having been aboard at the time. Reinstated in September 1799, he was appointed to the Annibal in 1804, and to Mont Blanc in 1805.

Lavillegris took part in the Trafalgar campaign. He was wounded at the Battle of Cape Finisterre, took part in the Battle of Trafalgar, and was eventually taken prisoner at the Battle of Cape Ortegal.

Lavillegris died of consequences of the wound sustained at the Battle of Cape Finisterre in Paris on 21 January 1807.

== Sources and references ==
- Dictionnaire des capitaines de vaisseau de Napoléon, Danielle & Bernard Quintin, SPM, 2003, ISBN 2-901952-42-9
