= Berrenger =

Berrenger may refer to:

- Berrenger's, American soap opera
- Charles Berrenger (1757–1814), French Navy officer
