= French ship Scipion (1801) =

Ship of the line of the French Navy

- Scale model of Achille, sister ship of French ship Scipion (1801), on display at the Musée national de la Marine in Paris.

History

France
- Name: Scipion
- Namesake: Scipio Africanus
- Builder: Lorient
- Launched: 29 March 1801
- Commissioned: 1802
- Honours and awards: Battle of Cape Finisterre (1805); Battle of Trafalgar
- Captured: 4 November 1805, by Royal Navy

United Kingdom
- Name: Scipion
- Acquired: 3 November 1805 by capture
- Fate: Broken up, 1819

General characteristics
- Class & type: Téméraire-class ship of the line
- Displacement: 3,069 tonneaux
- Tons burthen: 1,537 port tonneaux
- Length: 55.87 metres (183 ft 4 in) (172 pied)
- Beam: 14.90 metres (48 ft 11 in)
- Draught: 7.26 metres (23 ft 10 in) (22 pied)
- Propulsion: Up to 2,485 m^{2} (26,750 sq ft) of sails
- Armament: 74 guns: Lower gundeck: 28 × 36-pounder long guns; Upper gundeck: 30 × 18-pounder long guns; Forecastle and Quarter deck: 16 × 8-pounder long guns; 4 × 36-pounder carronades
- Armour: Timber

Scipion was a 74-gun French ship of the line, built at Lorient to a design by Jacques Noel Sane. She was laid down as Orient in late 1798, and renamed Scipion in 1801. She was first commissioned in 1802 and joined the French Mediterranean fleet based at Toulon, in the squadron of Admiral Leissègues. Consequently, she was one of the ships afloat in that port when war with England reopened in May 1803. She participated in the Battle of Cape Finisterre and the Battle of Trafalgar. The British captured her in the subsequent Battle of Cape Ortegal. In 1810 she participated in the Java campaign, which in 1847 earned her surviving crew the Naval General Service Medal. She participated in the blockade of Toulon in 1813 and was paid off in 1814. She was broken up in 1819.

== French Navy service ==
In 1805, she was part of Admiral Villeneuve's fleet. She took part in the Battle of Cape Finisterre and was one of Rear Admiral Pierre Dumanoir le Pelley's ships at the Battle of Trafalgar.

Dumanoir commanded the six-ship vanguard of the French fleet, with Formidable, Scipion, Duguay-Trouin, Mont Blanc, Intrépide and Neptune. Nelson's attacks left these ships downwind of the main confrontation and Dumanoir did not immediately obey Villeneuve's orders to return to the battle. When the ships did turn back, most of them only exchanged a few shots before retiring.

On 4 November 1805, in the Battle of Cape Ortegal, Admiral Sir Richard Strachan, with HMS Caesar, HMS Hero, HMS Courageux, HMS Namur and four frigates, defeated and captured what remained of the squadron. HMS Phoenix and HMS Révolutionnaire took Scipion, which the Royal Navy commissioned as HMS Scipion.

== Royal Navy service ==
Scipion arrived in Plymouth on 4 November 1805 and was laid up. She underwent repairs between June 1808 and November 1809, being commissioned under for the Channel in July 1809. Captain Charles Phillips Butler Bateman took command on 25 September 1809.

She became the flagship of Rear Admiral the Hon. Robert Stopford in 1810. Bateman and Stopford sailed her in the Bay of Biscay.

On 8 October she sailed for the Cape of Good Hope and then the East Indies. In 1811 Captain James Johnson took command. Stopford's fleet consisted of four sail of the line (including Scipion), thirteen frigates, seven sloops and eight cruisers of the East India Company, captured the island of Java on 18 September 1811. In 1847, the surviving members of the expedition were awarded the Naval General Service Medal with clasp "Java".

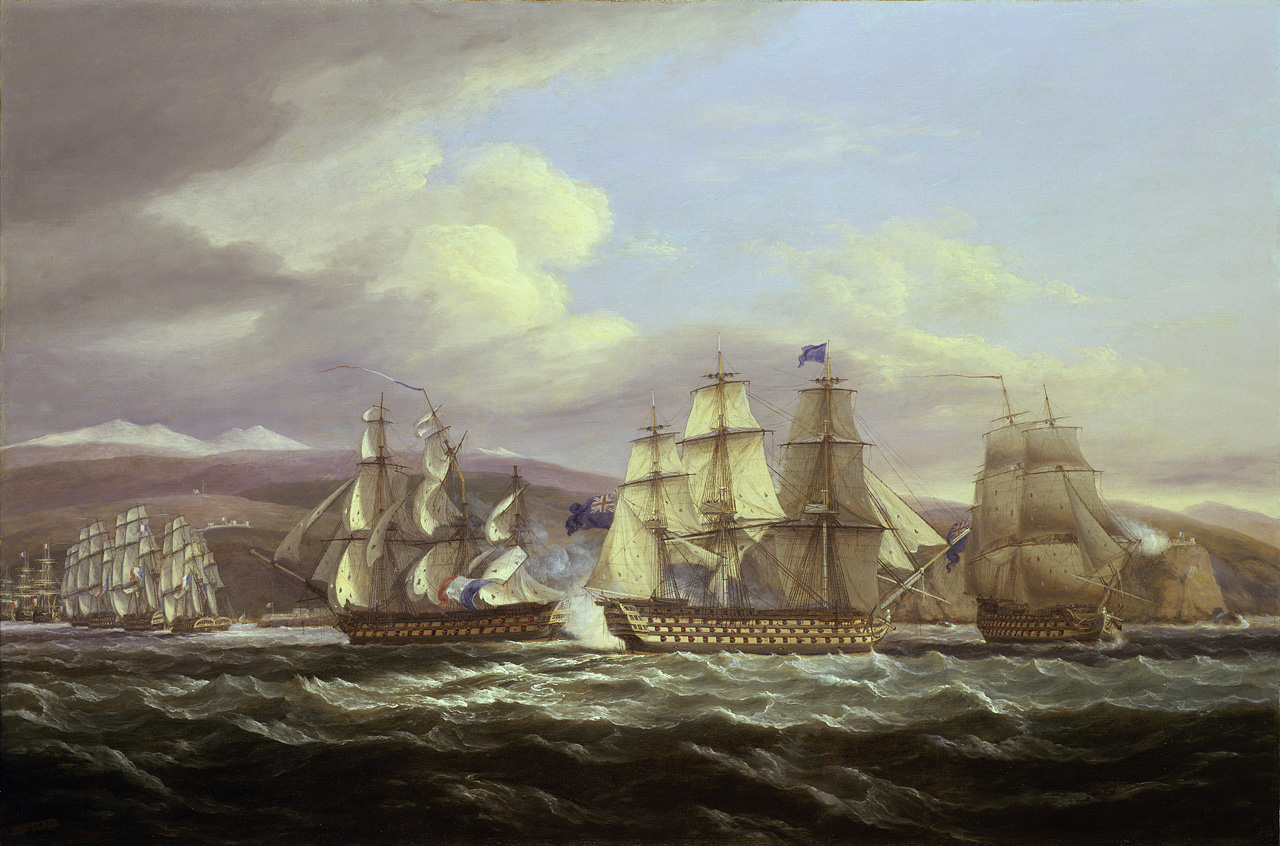
Blockade of Toulon, 1810-1814: Pellew's action, 5 November 1813, by Thomas Luny

Captain Henry Heathcote took command on 28 April 1812. He then sailed Scipion for the Mediterranean on 20 July 1812. Here she participated in the blockade of Toulon, including Admiral Edward Pellew's skirmish with the French fleet on 5 November 1813.

== Fate ==
Scipion was paid off at Portsmouth on 29 October 1814. She underwent a Middling Repair in September 1818, but then was broken up in January 1819.
