= Claude Touffet =

French Navy officer

Captain Claude Touffet (Quillebeuf, 17 June 1767 – Battle of Cape Ortegal, aboard the Dugay-Trouin, 4 November 1805) was a French Navy officer.

== Biography ==
Born to a family of sailors, Touffet started sailing in the merchant Navy before joined the Navy as an auxiliary ensign in 1792. He served on the 74-gun Téméraire, the frigate Junon, the 74 Aquilon and the Généreux in Brueys' fleet.

On Généreux, Touffet took part in the Battle of the Nile, escaping to Courfu. In March, Généreux set sail to escort a convoy bound for Corfu, but her captain, Commodore Louis-Jean-Nicolas Lejoille, decided to attack Brindisi on the way. He was killed in the ensuing exchange of fire, and Touffet, taking over, forced the city to surrender after a two-hour gunnery battle. He was consecutively promoted to captain.

He later served as first officer on Patriote, and took part in the Battle of Algeciras Bay on Indomptable, again taking over command after his captain was killed. After the battle, he was maintained as captain of Indomptable and promoted.

In 1802, he commanded the Héros and, from 1805, the Dugay-Trouin in Vice Admiral Pierre Dumanoir le Pelley's squadron. He took part in the Battle of Cape Finisterre, and in the Battle of Trafalgar.

He managed to escape the battle, but fell upon Admiral Sir Richard Strachan's squadron on 4 November 1805, leading to the Battle of Cape Ortegal. Touffet was killed during the fight, while Dugay-Trouin lost 150 men.

== Sources and references ==
- Dictionnaire des capitaines de vaisseau de Napoléon, Danielle & Bernard Quintin, SPM, 2003, ISBN 2-901952-42-9
