= French frigate Aréthuse (1808) =

History

France
- Name: Aréthuse
- Namesake: Arethusa
- Launched: 23 May 1808
- Renamed: Elbe, before 1808; Calypso, 1814; Elbe, 1815; Calypso, 1815
- Stricken: 1825
- Fate: Broken up 1841

General characteristics
- Type: Pallas-class frigate
- Armament: 40 guns

The Aréthuse was a 40-gun Pallas-class frigate of the French Navy.

Initially named Aréthuse, she was renamed Elbe while still under construction. She was launched on 23 May 1808 and commissioned under captain Charles Berrenger.

At the Bourbon Restoration, the ship was renamed to Calypso, reverted to Elbe during the Hundred Days, and renamed Calypso again after the final demise of Napoléon.

She was struck in 1825 and dismantled in 1841.
