= HMS Implacable (1805) =

British ship of the line (1805–1949)

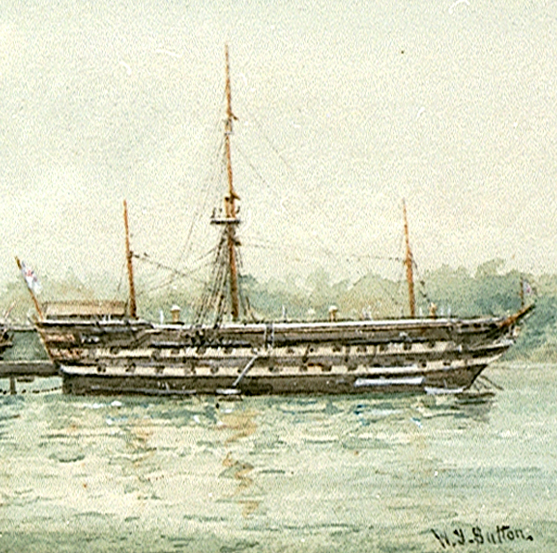
- Implacable in 1894, by W. J. Sutton

History

France
- Name: Duguay-Trouin
- Builder: Rochefort
- Laid down: 1797
- Launched: 24 March 1800
- Honours and awards: Participated in: Battle of Trafalgar
- Captured: 3 November 1805, by Royal Navy

United Kingdom
- Name: HMS Implacable
- Acquired: 3 November 1805
- Renamed: Foudroyant in 1943
- Honours and awards: Naval General Service Medal clasps: "Implacable 26 Augt. 1808"; "7 July Boat Service 1809"; "Syria"
- Fate: Scuttled 2 December 1949

General characteristics
- Class & type: Téméraire-class ship of the line
- Displacement: 3,069 tonneaux
- Tons burthen: 1,537 port tonneaux French service; 1,896 22/94 bm British service
- Length: 181 ft 6 in (55.3 m)
- Beam: 48 ft 11 in (14.9 m)
- Depth of hold: 20 ft 7 in (6.3 m)
- Sail plan: Full-rigged ship
- Complement: 640 officers and crew
- Armament: French service; Gun deck: 4 × 36-pounder carronades + 16 × 8-pounder guns; Lower gun deck: 28 × 36-pounder guns; Upper gun deck: 30 × 18-pounder guns; British service; Gun deck: 30 × 32-pounder guns; Upper gun deck: 30 × 18-pounder guns; Quarterdeck: 12 × 32-pounder guns; Forecastle: 2 × 12-pounder guns

HMS Implacable was a third-rate, 74-gun ship of the line of the Royal Navy. She was originally the French Navy's Téméraire-class ship of the line Duguay-Trouin, launched in 1800.

She survived the Battle of Trafalgar only for the British to capture her at the subsequent Battle of Cape Ortegal. In British service she participated in the capture of the Imperial Russian Navy 74-gun ship of the line Vsevolod (Russian: Всеволод) in the Baltic in 1808 during the Anglo-Russian War. Later, Implacable became a training ship. Eventually, she became the second oldest ship in the Royal Navy after HMS Victory, Lord Nelson's flagship at Trafalgar. When the Royal Navy finally scuttled Implacable in 1949, she flew both the French and British flags side-by-side as she sank.

== French career ==
The ship was originally named Duguay-Trouin after René Duguay-Trouin. Construction, to a plan by Rolland but updated to a plan by Sané, began in 1794 but was interrupted in 1795. She was finally laid down in 1797, and launched at Rochefort in 1800.

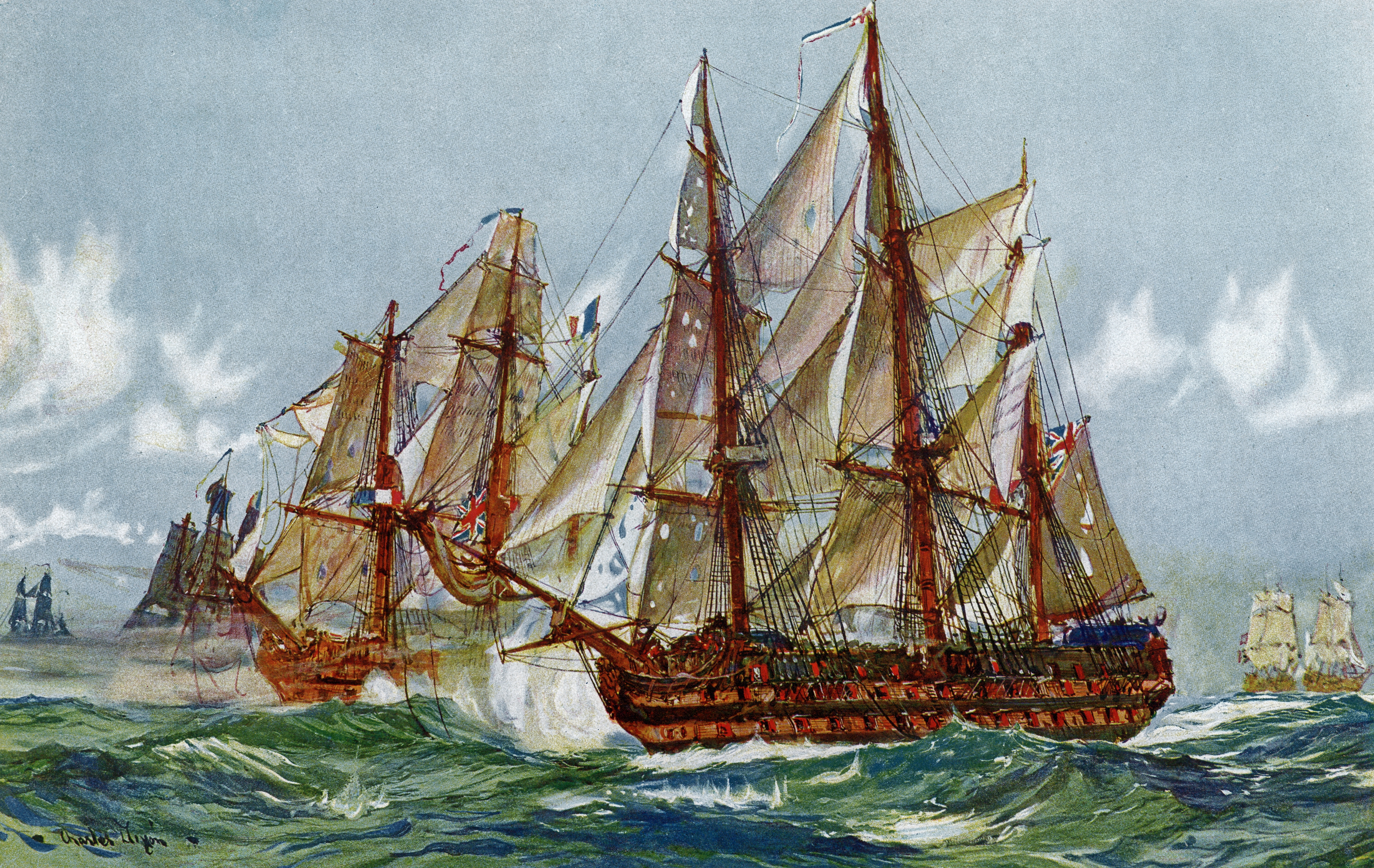
The taking of the Duguay-Trouin at the 1805 Battle of Cape Ortegal, painted by Charles Dixon

On 22 November 1802, under Captain Claude Touffet, she departed Toulon as part of a squadron commanded by Commodore Quérangal, also comprising the frigate Guerrière and the flagship Duquesne, a sister Téméraire-class vessel armed en flûte. Bound for Santo Domingo, the squadron found itself blockaded in Cap Français during the blockade of Saint-Domingue by HMS Elephant, Bellerophon, Theseus and Vanguard. After a successful sortie in the dark, the squadron split up. Guerrière and Duguay-Trouin managed to escape but Vanguard, with Tartar, captured Duquesne. Under Capitaine de Vaisseau L'hermite she participated in an action at Cap Français.

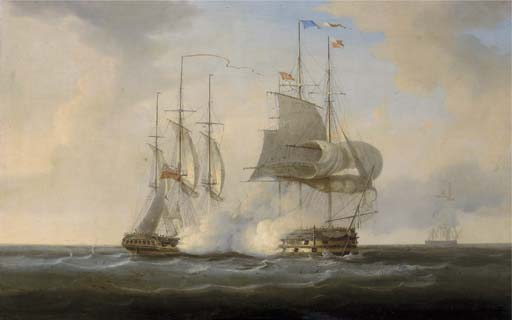
The gallant encounter between HMS Boadicea and two French warships Le Duquay-Trouin and Guerriére on 31 August 1803. William John Huggins

On 21 October 1805, Duguay-Trouin took part in the Battle of Trafalgar, where she was part of the vanguard of the French fleet under Contre-amiral Pierre Dumanoir le Pelley, and was one of four French ships that escaped capture that day.

=== Capture ===
On 3 November 1805, British Captain Sir Richard Strachan, with Caesar, Hero, Courageux, Namur and four frigates, defeated and captured what remained of the Franco-Spanish fleet. In the battle, the captain of Duguay-Trouin, Claude Touffet, was killed, her masts were shot away, and she was eventually captured.

== British service in the Napoleonic Wars ==
The Royal Navy commissioned her as a third rate under the name HMS Implacable. Implacable served with the Royal Navy for the rest of the Napoleonic Wars.

=== Anglo-Russian War ===
During the Napoleonic Wars, France and Russia signed peace treaties in July 1807, making them allies against Britain and Sweden. The September 1807 British attack on Copenhagen, to reinforce a naval blockade against French supplies, instigated the Anglo-Russian War. In early 1808 Russia initiated the Finnish War in response to Sweden's refusal to bow to Russian pressure to join the anti-British alliance. Russia captured Finland and made it a Grand Duchy under the Russian Empire. The British decided to take counter-measures and in May sent a fleet, including Centaur, under Vice-Admiral Sir James Saumarez to the Baltic. Thus in March 1808 Implacable was in the Baltic, under the command of Captain Thomas Byam Martin.

On 9 July, a Russian fleet under Admiral Peter Khanykov left Kronstadt. The Swedish Navy massed a fleet under Counter-admiral Rudolf Cederström, consisting of 11 ships of the line and five frigates at Örö and Jungfrusund, to oppose Khanykov's fleet. On 16 August, Saumarez sent Centaur and Implacable to join Cederström's fleet. They chased two Russian frigates on 19 July and joined the Swedes the following day.

On 22 August, the Russian fleet, which consisted of nine ships of the line, five large frigates and six smaller ones, moved from Hanko and appeared off the Örö roads the next day. The Swedish ships from Jungfrusund had joined Rear-Admiral Nauckhoff and by the evening of 24 August the combined Anglo-Swedish force had made its preparations. Early the next day they sailed from Örö to meet the Russians.

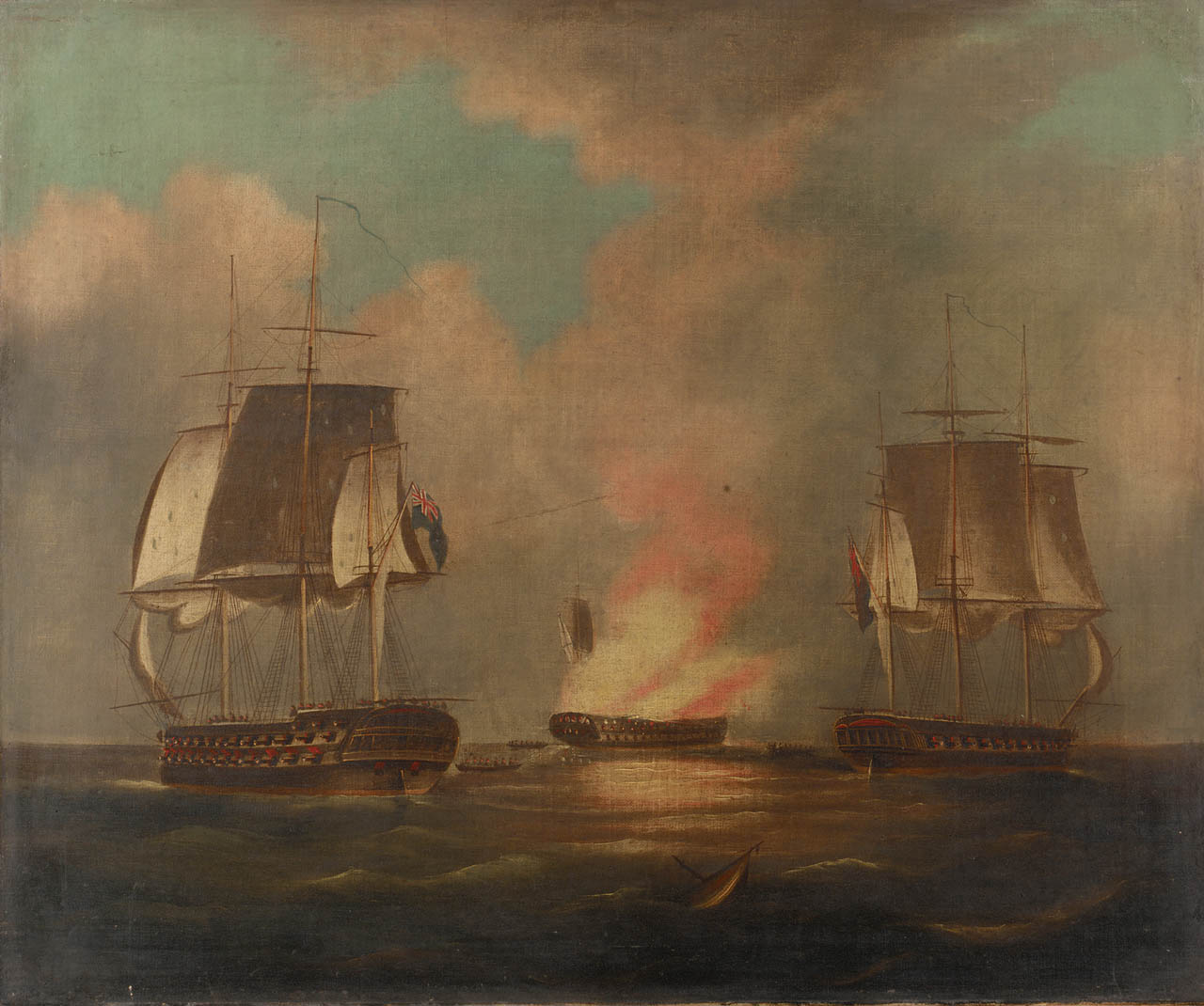
Russian ship Vsevolod being burnt while Implacable and Centaur watch near Rogerwick bay on 26 August 1808

The Anglo-Swedish fleet discovered the Russians off Hango Udd but the Russians retreated as the Allied ships followed them. Centaur and Implacable exhibited superior sailing and slowly outdistanced their Swedish allies. At 5am on 26 August Implacable caught up with a Russian straggler, the 74-gun Vsevolod (also Sewolod), under Captain Daniil Rudnev.

Implacable and Vsevolod exchanged fire for about 20 minutes before Vsevolod ceased firing. Vsevolod hauled down her colours, but Hood recalled Implacable because the Russian fleet was approaching. During the fight Implacable lost six dead and 26 wounded; Vsevolod lost some 48 dead and 80 wounded.

The Russian frigate Poluks then towed Vsevolod towards Rager Vik (Ragerswik or Rogerswick), but when Centaur started to chase them the frigate dropped her tow. The Russians sent out boats to bring her in, in which endeavor they almost succeeded. They did succeed in putting 100 men aboard her as reinforcements and to replace her casualties.

However, just outside the port, Centaur was able to collide with Vsevolod. A party of seamen from Centaur then lashed her mizzen to the Russian bowsprit before Centaur opened fire. Vsevolod dropped her anchor and with both ships stuck in place, both sides attempted to board the other vessel. In the meantime, Implacable had come up and added her fire to the melee. After a battle of about half an hour, the Russian vessel struck again.

Implacable hauled Centaur off. Their prize was so firmly aground that after taking out the prisoners and wounded men, Sir Samuel Hood, in Centaur, ordered Vsevolod to be burnt. The British removed their prisoners and then set fire to Vsevolod, which blew up some hours later. Centaur had lost three killed and 27 wounded. Vsevolod lost another 124 men killed and wounded in the battle with Centaur; 56 Russians escaped by swimming ashore. In all, Vsevolod had lost 303 killed, wounded and missing.

The action with Vsevolod was the largest engagement during the Anglo-Russian War. In 1847 the Admiralty awarded the Naval General Service Medal with the clasps "Implacable 26 Augt. 1808" and "Centaur 26 Augt. 1808" to all surviving claimants from the action.

Vice-Admiral Saumarez with his entire squadron joined the Anglo-Swedish squadron the next day. They then blockaded Khanykov's squadron for some months. After the British and the Swedes abandoned the blockade, the Russian fleet was able to return to Kronstadt.

=== Return to the Baltic ===
By the summer of 1809 Martin and Implacable were back in the Baltic, and Admiral Saumarez sent her and Melpomene to sail east of Nargen Island. At the beginning of July 1809 she and Melpomene sailed into the Gulf of Narva, some 110 miles east of Tallinn. There they captured nine vessels laden with timber, spars and cordage, which were the property of the Russian Emperor. Implacable, Melpomene and Prometheus deployed their boats to search all the creeks and inlets along the coast but found nothing more. The squadron then began a search of the Finnish coast, which yielded them three more cargo vessels. More importantly, the British discovered that a convoy was sheltering under Percola Point with an escort of eight gunboats. Each Russian gun-boat mounted both a 32 and a 24-pounder gun, and had a crew of 46 men. The British decided to send in a cutting out party to seize the convoy, and its protectors. In Martin's word, the intent was "to impress these Strangers with that Sense of Respect and Fear, which His Majesty's other Enemies are accustomed to show to the British Flag".

At 9pm on 7 July, Implacable, Melpomene, Prometheus and Bellerophon assembled 17 boats, all under the command of Lieutenant Joseph Hawkey of Implacable. The Russians expected the British attack and positioned their vessels between two rocks off Hango Head (Hangöudde). This meant that the British would have to come straight towards the gunboats' cannon rather than flanking them. The British came straight in, enduring the fire without firing back, until they reached the Russians, at which point they boarded the gunboats.

Of the eight gunboats, the British captured six, among them gun boats Nos. 5, 10, 13, and 15. They sank one gunboat and one escaped. The British also captured all twelve of the ships and vessels the gunboats had been protecting, as well as a large armed ship, which they burnt. These were laden with powder and provisions for the Russian army. British losses were heavy. Grapeshot killed Hawkey while he was boarding his second gunboat. Including Hawkey, Implacable lost six men killed and 17 wounded. In all, the British lost 17 men killed and 37 wounded. The Russians lost at least 65 men killed, and 127 taken prisoner, of whom 51 were wounded. For this action, the Admiralty issued the clasp "7 July Boat Service 1809" to the Naval General Service Medal.

=== France and Spain ===
In January 1810, Captain George Cockburn took command of Implacable. She then sailed to Quiberon Bay with a small squadron that also included Disdainful, a brig, and the schooner Nonpareil, all escorting the Baron de Kolli. (Note: The Admiralty has no record of an HMS Disdainful. It is therefore not clear which vessel this was.) His mission was to arrange the escape of Ferdinand VII of Spain, whom the French had imprisoned at the Chateau of Valençay. The mission failed when Ferdinand refused to have anything to do with the British, and Kolli was arrested. Implacable then returned to Spithead.

On 17 July Rear Admiral Sir Richard Keats arrived on Implacable to take charge of the British support of the Spanish in the Siege of Cádiz. Marshal Victor's French army had completely blockaded the Isla de León by land and were further fortifying the coast with works that supplemented the existing defences. Eleven or twelve British and Spanish line-of-battle ships anchored as close to shore as they could without grounding. The allied troops defending Leon consisted of 16,500 Spaniards, 4,000 British and Germans, and 1,400 Portuguese.

In August the Allies attacked the French at Moguer, a town in the province of Huelva. Cockburn, sailing in the brig-sloop Jasper, directed the naval portion of the attack. General Lacey's Spanish troops and horses landed from the transports on 23 August about 22 miles south of the town. They then marched along the beach with 11 flat boats under Lieutenant Westphal of Implacable moving with them. The boats then ferried the troops across a large branch of the river, enabling the troops to reach Moguer next morning. The Spanish took the French somewhat by surprise and drove them out of the town. The French, numbering perhaps 1100 men, rallied and counter-attacked several times, but without success. The Spaniards followed them, but most of the French were cavalry and were able to withdraw towards Seville. Spanish casualties were slight.

Milford arrived in Cadiz on 2 September and Rear Admiral Keats moved to her. On 6 September Implacable sailed from Cadiz to Havana as escort to two Spanish 3-deckers. From there she sailed to Vera Cruz, Mexico, to pick up specie. She returned to Cadiz on 18 February 1811 with 2,000,000 dollars on board. (Note: Cockburn benefited personally from this mission in that under the regulations of the period a captain was entitled to a commission of a half to one percent of the value of the specie carried in his vessel.) (Note: Marshall reports the amount of specie as six million dollars. All other sources report it as two million.) Implacable then participated in the defense of the Isla de Leon. In August Captain I. R. Watson took command. By 1813 Implacable was back in Plymouth.

== Post war ==
From August to November 1840 Implacable participated in the operations on the coast of Syria, mainly involved in the blockade of Alexandria. The Ottoman government awarded medals to the officers and men employed during the campaign. In 1847 the Admiralty issued the Naval General Service Medal with clasp "Syria" to the officers and men who had participated in the campaign and who claimed the medal.

From the Eastern Mediterranean Implacable sailed to Malta and then spent about a year in the Mediterranean, though she made one trip to Plymouth. She visited Syracuse, Corfu, Gibraltar and Tunis. By 15 February 1842, she was in Devonport, condemned as unfit for sea service. She was to be docked to extend her life.

== Post active service ==
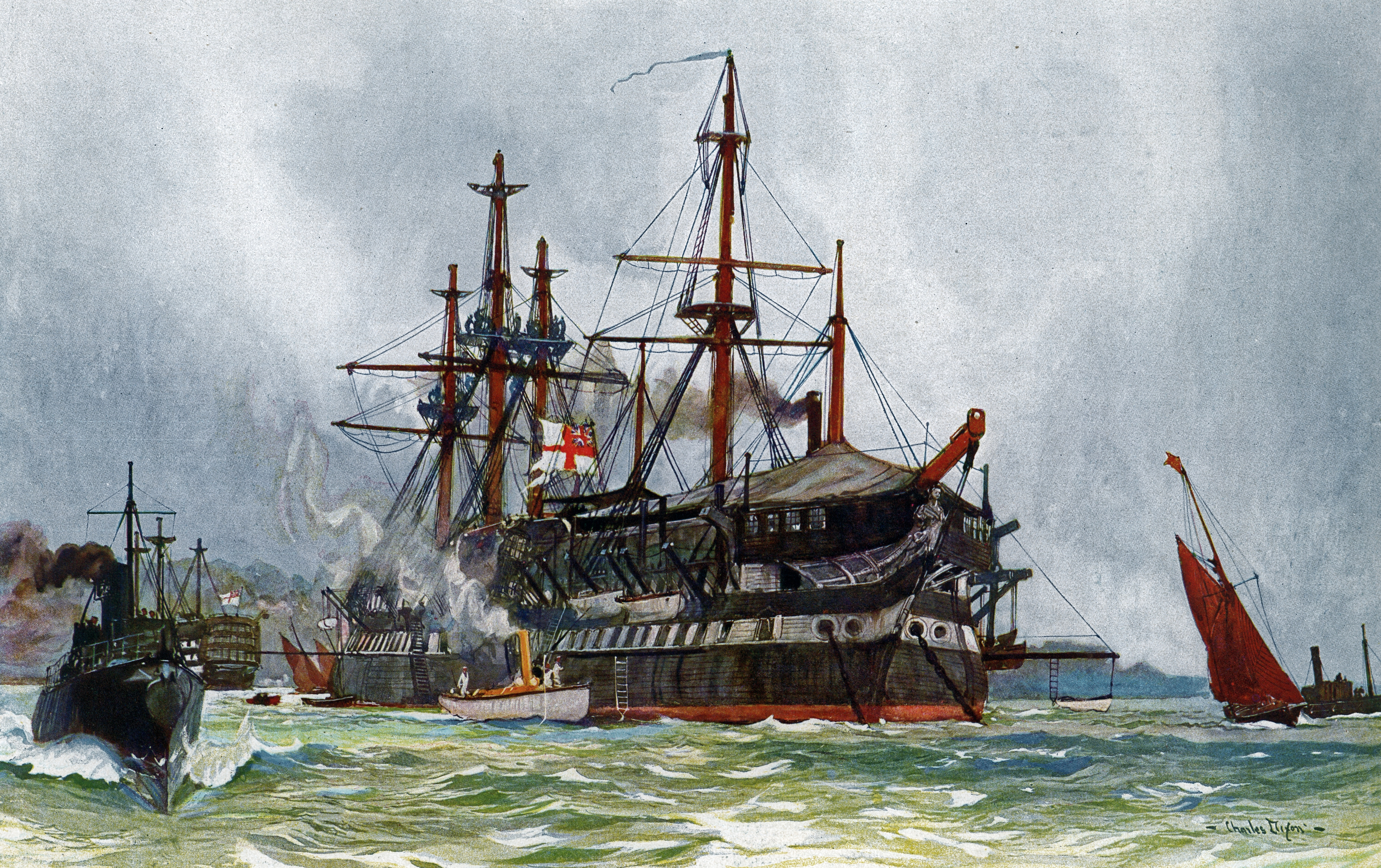
The old Implacable, by Charles Dixon.

From 1844 she was out of commission at Devonport. A conversion to a training ship permitted her to return to service in June 1855 in the Hamoaze. Initially she was under the command of Captain Arthur Lowe. In January 1865, under Commander Edward H.I. Ray, she became a training ship for boys. Commander Henry Carr took command in October 1877, with Commander Thomas Sturges Jackson following him in 1880.

In 1908 King Edward VII intervened to save the ship. In 1912 she was handed over to philanthropist Geoffry Wheatly Cobb (1858–1931) for preservation, and for use as a boys' training ship. There were several appeals to help preserve Implacable over the years, especially in the 1920s. Funds were raised and she underwent several restorations, which continued in the 1930s. In conjunction with HMS Trincomalee, which is still fully built and located in England, she served as an accommodation ship, a training ship, a holiday ship, and a coal hulk, and the two ships were renamed Foudroyant in 1943. H. V. Morton saw her at Devonport Dockyard during one of the restorations and was told she had been "lying for years in Falmouth, and we are giving her a wash and brush up before sending her back as a training ship".

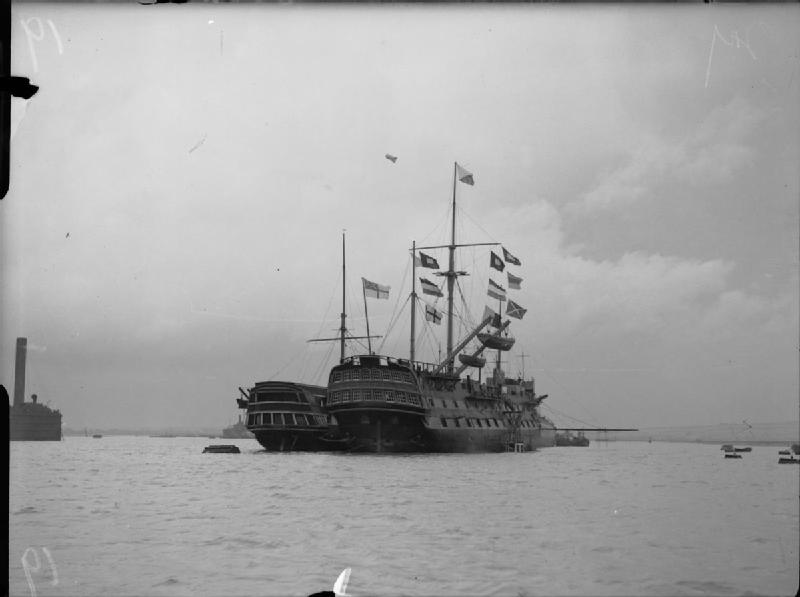
View of Implacable during World War II flying the first part of the historic "England expects..." signal on Trafalgar Day in 1943

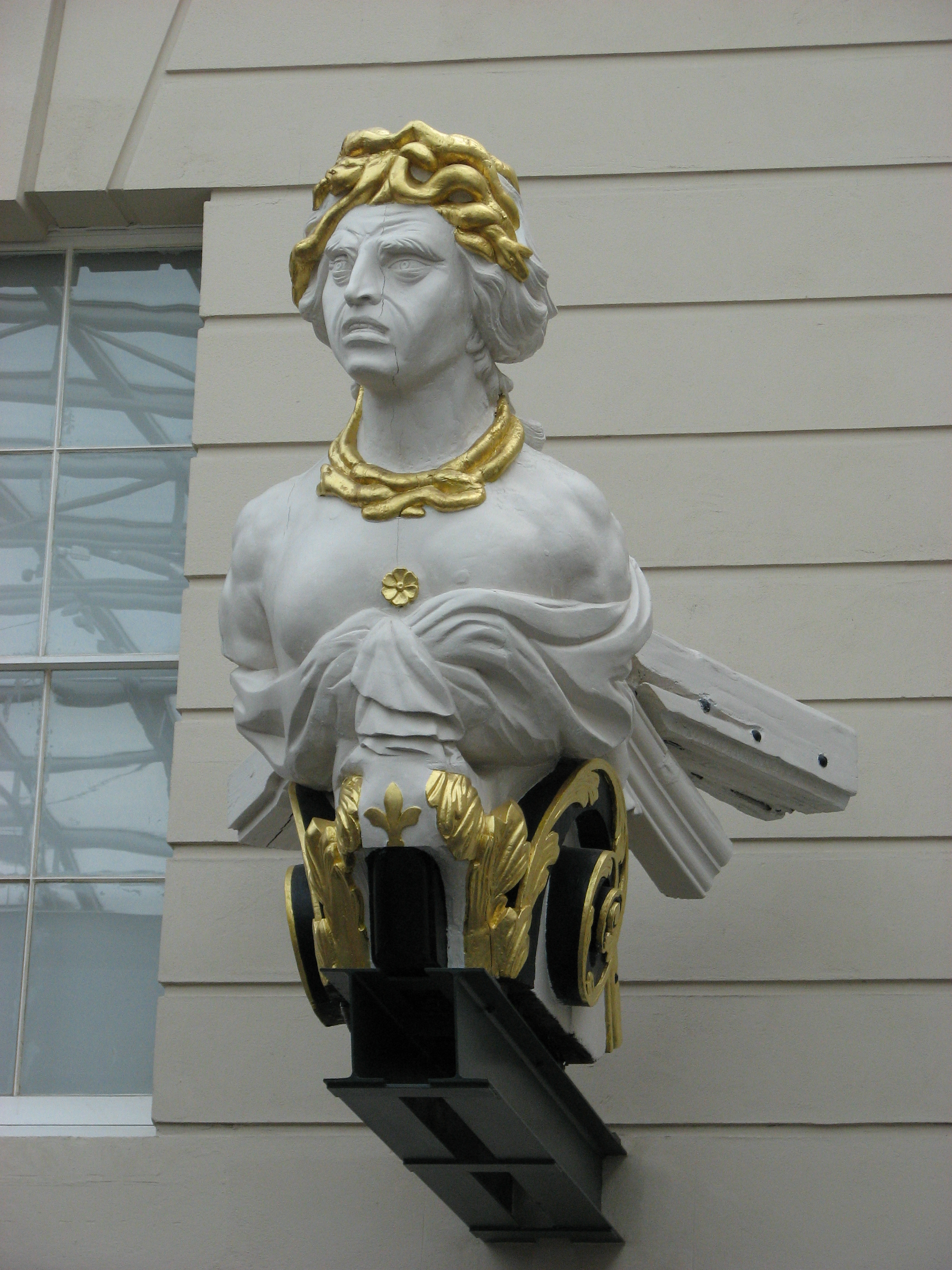
Figurehead of HMS Implacable in Neptune Court of the National Maritime Museum

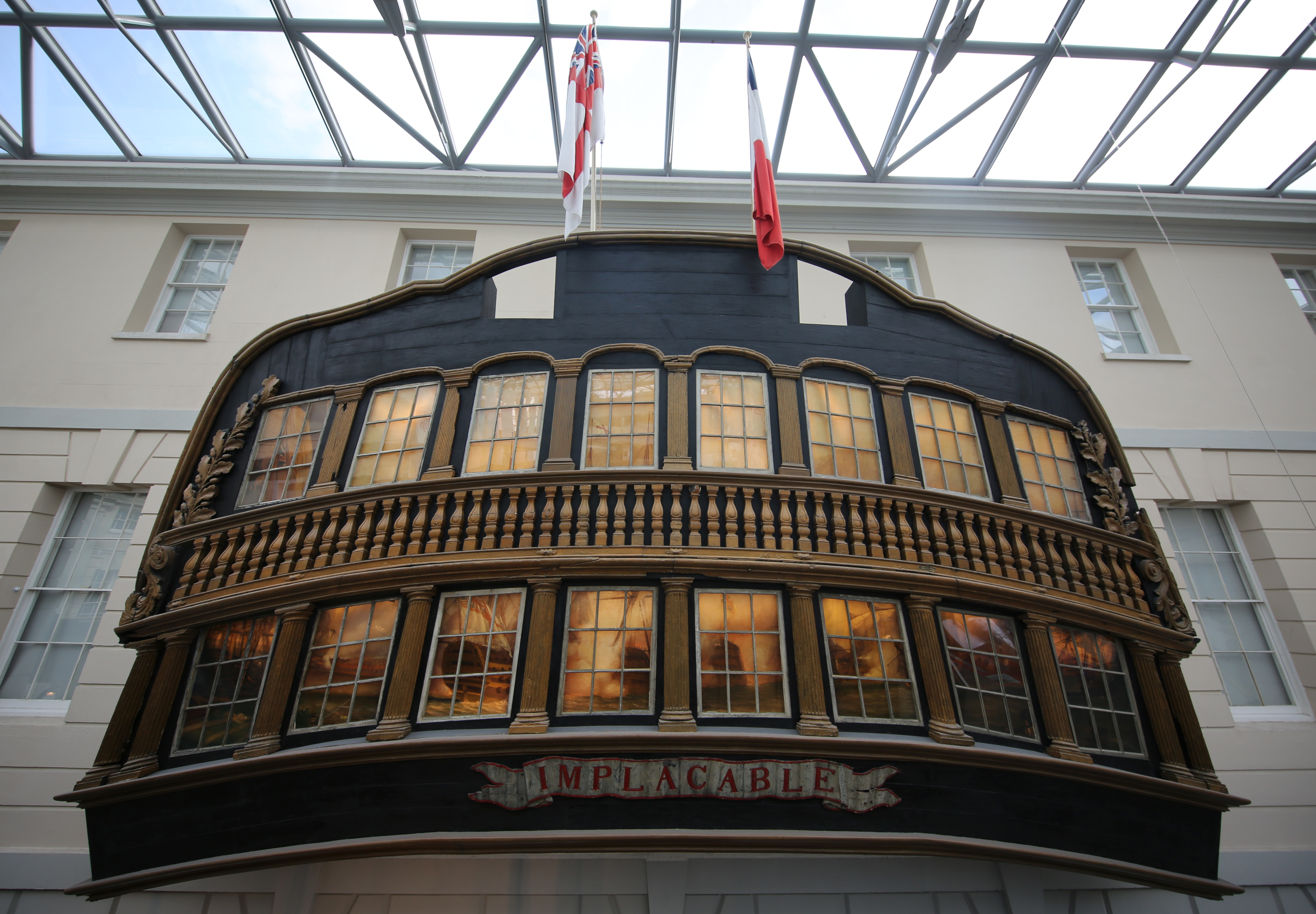
The stern gallery of HMS Implacable, formerly the Duguay-Trouin, on display at the National Maritime Museum.

== Fate ==
Unlike the unfortunate Wellesley, Implacable survived the Second World War. Still, the Admiralty scuttled her by an explosive charge on 2 December 1949. A fireboat towed her to a spot east of the Isle of Wight and she sank into Saint Catherine's Deep, about five miles from Ventnor. Implacable was by then the second-oldest ship of the Navy after Victory, and there were heavy protests against her disposal. However, given postwar austerity, the British decided against the cost of her restoration, which was estimated at £150,000 with another £50,000 for re-rigging (a total equivalent to approximately £6.1 million in 2025). In 1947 they had offered her to the French, who too declined to spend the money to turn her into a museum. Her figurehead and stern galleries were saved and are on display in the National Maritime Museum at Greenwich, while her capstan is on display at the maritime museum at Rochefort. The doors to the Captain's cabin are in the collection of the museum ship HMS Unicorn, Dundee. Public reaction to the "criminal action against the maritime history of Britain" forced the government to support the preservation of Cutty Sark.

== In popular culture ==
In the 1999 Patrick O'Brian novel Blue at the Mizzen, set soon after the end of the Napoleonic Wars in 1815, newly promoted Adm. John "Lucky Jack" Aubrey is ordered by the Admiralty to take command of HMS Implacable and the Royal Navy's South African Squadron.
