= HMS Caesar (1793) =

Ship of the line of the Royal Navy

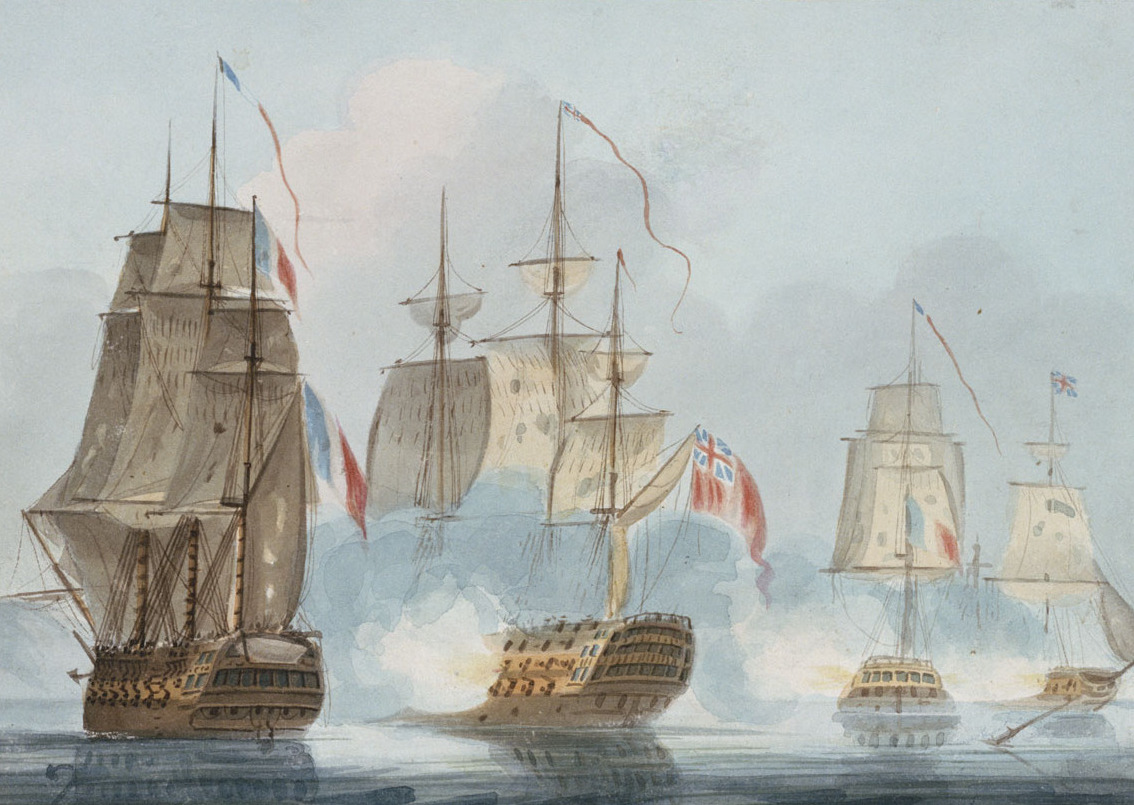
- Caesar (second from left) at the Battle of Cape Ortegal

History

Great Britain
- Name: HMS Caesar
- Ordered: November 1783
- Builder: Plymouth Dockyard
- Laid down: 24 January 1786
- Launched: 16 November 1793
- Fate: Broken up, 1821
- Notes: Participated in: Battle of Algeciras Bay; Battle of Cape Ortegal; Battle of Les Sables-d'Olonne

General characteristics
- Class & type: 80-gun third rate ship of the line
- Tons burthen: 2002 74/94 (bm)
- Length: 181 ft (55 m) (gundeck)
- Beam: 51 ft 3 in (15.62 m)
- Depth of hold: 22 ft 4 in (6.81 m)
- Propulsion: Sails
- Sail plan: Full-rigged ship
- Armament: 80 guns: Gundeck: 30 × 32 pdrs; Upper gundeck: 32 × 24 pdrs; Quarterdeck: 14 × 9 pdrs; Forecastle: 4 × 9 pdrs

HMS Caesar was an 80-gun third-rate ship of the line of the Royal Navy launched on 16 November 1793 at Plymouth. She was designed by Sir Edward Hunt, and was the only ship built to her draught. She was also one of only two British-built 80-gun ships of the period, the other being HMS Foudroyant.

== Service ==
In 1798, some of her crew were court-martialed for mutiny. On 19 December 1795, she ran aground on the Owers Sandbank, in the English Channel off the coast of Sussex. She was refloated and taken in to Portsmouth, Hampshire.

=== Battle of Algeciras Bay ===
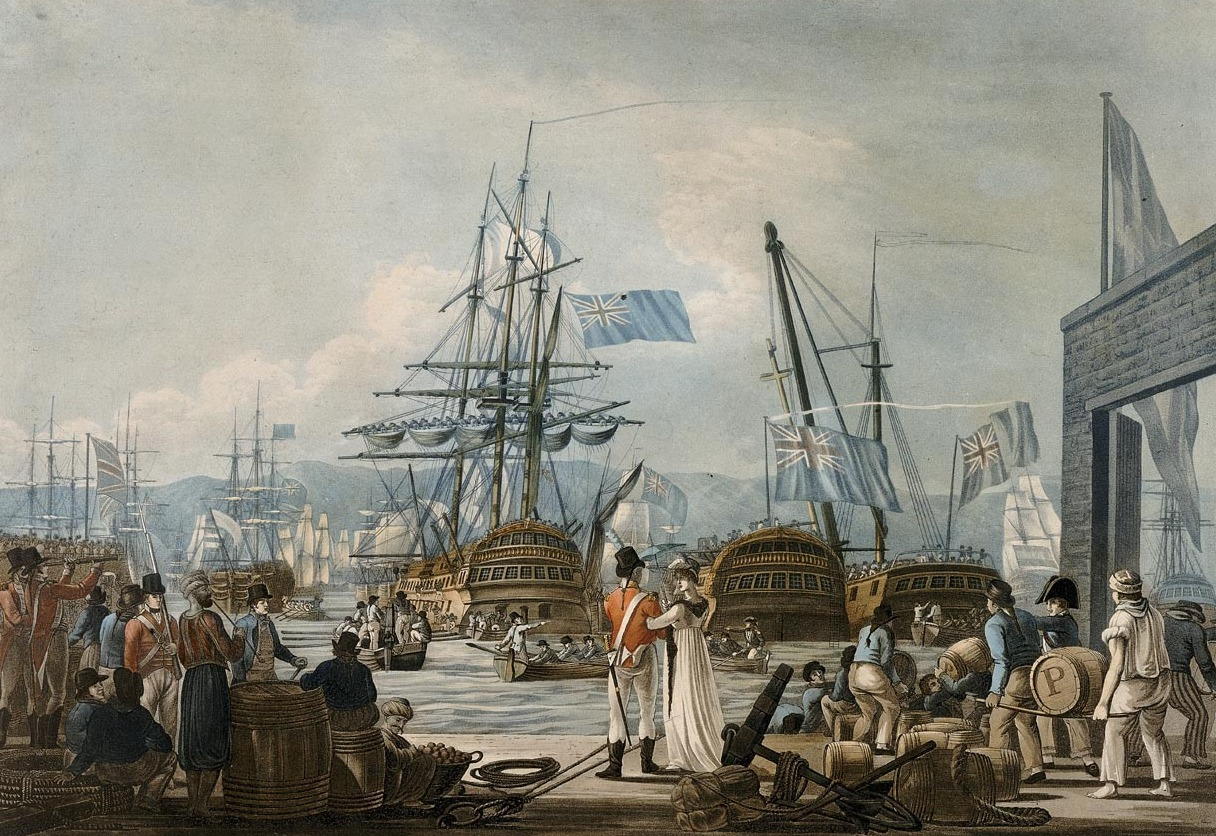
Caesar preparing to sail from Gibraltar on 12 July 1801

Ceasar fought in the Algeciras campaign in July 1801, during which her master, William Grave, was killed in action. On 30 April 1802, under command of Sir James Saumarez, she made contact with USS Constellation near Gibraltar.

=== Battle of Cape Ortegal ===
The Battle of Cape Ortegal was the final action of the Trafalgar Campaign, and was fought between a squadron of the Royal Navy and a remnant of the fleet that had been destroyed several weeks earlier at the Battle of Trafalgar. It took place on 4 November 1805 off Cape Ortegal, in north-west Spain and saw a squadron under Captain Sir Richard Strachan in Caesar defeat and capture a French squadron under Rear-Admiral Pierre Dumanoir le Pelley.

=== Battle of Les Sables-d'Olonne ===
In 1809, she took part in the Battle of Les Sables-d'Olonne.

== Fate ==
She was converted to serve as a depot ship in 1814, and was broken up in 1821.
