= Pierre Dumanoir le Pelley =

Pierre Étienne René Marie Dumanoir Le Pelley
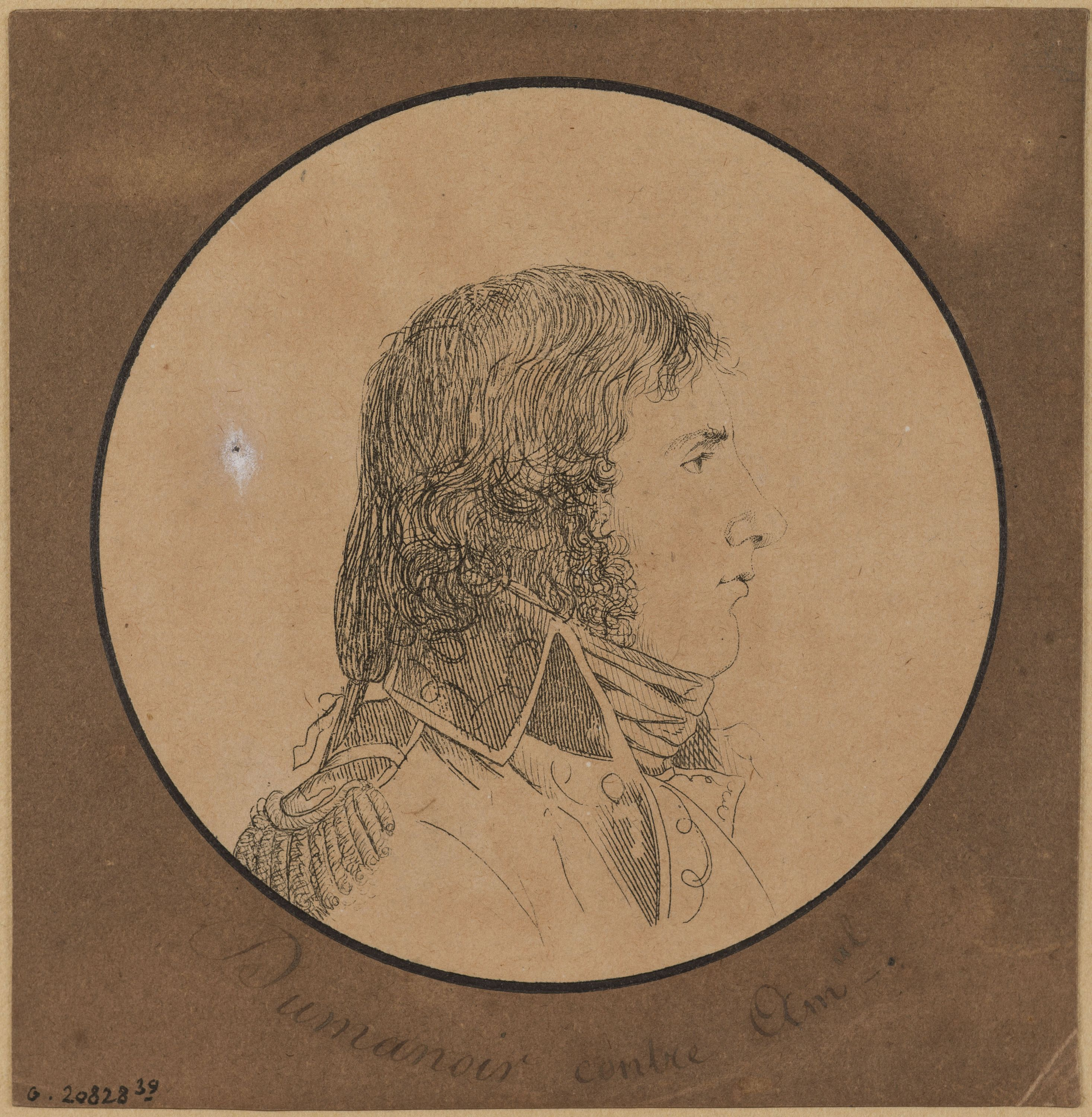
- c. 1791–1798 portrait
- Born: 2 August 1770; Granville, Normandy
- Died: 7 July 1829 (aged 58); Paris, Île-de-France
- Relatives: Georges René Le Peley de Pléville (cousin)
- Military career
- Allegiance: Kingdom of France; French First Republic; First French Empire
- Branch: French Navy; French Imperial Navy
- Service years: 1787 – 1815
- Rank: Vice admiral
- Units: Berwick; Révolution; Carrère; Formidable
- Commands: Danzig Command; Marseille Command
- Conflicts: French Revolutionary Wars; French expedition to Ireland (1796); Napoleonic Wars; Battle of Trafalgar; Battle of Cape Ortegal (surrendered)
- Awards: Count of the Empire; Legion of Honour; Order of Saint Louis

Vice-Admiral Pierre Étienne René Marie Dumanoir Le Pelley (2 August 1770 – 7 July 1829) was a French Navy officer best known for commanding the vanguard of the French fleet at the Battle of Trafalgar. His conduct during this battle was the subject of controversy.

== Family ==
Pierre Étienne René Marie Dumanoir Le Pelley was descended from a very old family of the Granville bourgeoisie, who had once earned a considerable fortune in maritime armaments and was ennobled by King Louis XVIII.

His father Louis Pierre Etienne Le Pelley (1733-1807), Sieur du Manoir, was a privateer captain, shipowner and bourgeois of Granville. Pierre Dumanoir Le Pelley is the 2nd cousin of Georges René Le Peley de Pléville (1726-1805).

His mother Jeanne Élisabeth Lucas de Lezeaux (1744-1819) is the daughter of Charles Marie, squire, Lord of Lezeaux, honorary lord of Saint Pair and Saint Aubin des Préaux in the parish of Saint-Pair-sur-Mer.

== Youth and beginnings ==
=== Rapid advancement ===
Pierre Dumanoir Le Pelley entered the navy at the age of seventeen in March 1787 as an élève de port and served in the Antilles until 1790. Appointed second lieutenant in port two years later in April 1789 he boarded the frigates Pomone and Néréide, cruising off Africa. He then embarked on the fluyt Dromadaire, bound for Cayenne, as an ensign.

Promoted to sub-lieutenant in 1790, he was appointed to the staff of Admiral Martin. He served on Sans-Culotte. He was not yet twenty-three years old when he was appointed Lieutenant de vaisseau in June 1793.

Two years later, in Floréal year III (May 1795), at less than twenty-five years of age, he obtained the rank of Capitaine de corvette and command of the Berwick in Richery's squadron, which took over a large convoy in the Mediterranean Sea and was then tasked with destroying English fishing establishments in Newfoundland.

=== A controversial advancement ===
Some biographies suggest that his rapid progress could be explained by his cousin Georges-René Pléville Le Pelley.

The latter, his father's first cousin, forty-four years his senior, had certainly been called to the commission of the Navy to be one of the three administrators who prepared the law of 3 brumaire year III (24 October 1794). In 1795, the Directory already wanted him as Minister of the Navy, but he refused. Truguet was appointed and Pléville-Le-Pelley remained under requisition from him as head of division. The Directoire finally convinced him to accept and appointed him French Minister of the Navy and the Colonies on the 1st fructidor an V (18 August 1797). However, Pléville resigned as minister on 8 Floréal year VI (27 April 1798) because of a disagreement with Bonaparte over the Egyptian campaign and after having predicted the Aboukir disaster of 2 August 1798.

By the time his first cousin became minister, Dumanoir had already been a captain for two years. Like many of his counterparts, he benefited above all from the accelerated advances of the revolutionary navy, from which emigration had just taken a large number of officers.

== French Directory ==
On 15 December 1796, a French fleet of 17 ships of the line, 14 frigates, 6 corvettes and avisos, 6 barges and 20 troopships carrying 21,000 soldiers under the command of General Lazare Hoche left Brest, France for Ireland. Dumanoir commanded, under the orders of Rear-Admiral François Joseph Bouvet, the ship Révolution. As soon as he left, the fleet became disorganised by the ruse of a British frigate which, in the darkness of the night of the 16th to the 17th, gave false signals to some of the French ships. Burning fires and cannon shots deceived 6 ships and 6 frigates, which continued on their way, instead of obeying the vice-admiral who ordered them to turn back.

When the day came, Justin Bonaventure Morard de Galles and Hoche, onboard the frigate Fraternité, found themselves alone and headed for Bantry Bay, designated for the planned rendezvous point. On the point of arriving there, they met the ship Revolution and the frigate Scévola sinking low in the water. Dumanoir took in part of the crew. The scattered fleet, without a leader, had headed, ship by ship, towards Bantry Bay, where the ships had waited for a few days, then, impatient, had left for the stampede. Hoche had to retreat. While the armies of the Republic won victories everywhere on the continent, the British navy triumphed on every sea. Dumanoir was not yet twenty-seven years old when the Directory appointed him head of division in Messidor An V (July 1797).

In the year VI (from 22 September 1797 to 21 September 1798), Dumanoir contributed to the preparations for the departure of the fleet for the French invasion of Egypt and Syria. On 19 May 1798, the fleet left Toulon under the command of Vice-Admiral Brueys d'Aigalliers. Rear Admiral Gantheaume was the major-general of the squadron. Three other Rear Admirals commanded the divisions of the fleet: Blanquet du Chayla led the vanguard; Villeneuve, the rearguard; Decrès, the light squadron. Dumanoir boarded the ship Dubois and was in charge of the direction of the convoy attached to the army. On 1 July 1798, the French army arrived in front of Alexandria without seeing a single enemy sail. The landings took place immediately, and the troops marched on Alexandria taken the next day. Bonaparte appointed Dumanoir commander of the port. Vice-Admiral Brueys anchored his fleet north-east of Alexandria as close as possible to the islet of Abukir, protected by a battery.

British Admiral Horatio Nelson arrived on 1 August 1798 in front of Abukir, where the tricolour flag was flying. Brueys believed so little on the return of the British that he had not sent any of his frigates to cross the sea to signal the appearance of the enemy. He was very surprised to see them arrive. Nothing was ready for a battle, the boats and part of the crews were ashore. The Battle of the Nile lasted two days, from 1 to 2 August 1798, and the ensuing disaster dealt a terrible blow to the esteem and power of the French navy. On 5 August of the following year, Napoleon, who had understood that he was needed in Paris and that he would be well received there, ordered Dumanoir and Rear Admiral Gantheaume - but without putting them in his confidence - to speed up supplies to the two old Venetian frigates, Muiron and Corrèze, already armed and equipped, and to give him notice of the movements of the British squadron.

On 21 August 1799, Bonaparte arrived in Alexandria. On the 22nd he boarded the Muiron commanded by Larue and on the 23rd he set sail. The Muiron carried General Bonaparte, Rear Admiral Gantheaume, Berthier, Andréossy, Monge, Berthollet, Denon, de Lavalette and de Bourienne. Dumanoir commanded the Corrèze which had taken Lannes, Murat, de Marmont and Parceval-Grandmaison on board. On 8 October 1799, Bonaparte disembarked at Fréjus.

== French Consulate ==
The coup of 18 Brumaire marked the end of the Directory and the French Revolution and the beginning of the Consulate. On this occasion, Dumanoir received a sword as a national reward for his participation, and a few months later, at the age of twenty-nine, he was raised to the rank of Counter admiral in 1799. During the year IX (September 1800 to September 1801), he commanded several divisions in Brest and then in Cádiz where he was in charge of details relating to armaments.

In the spring of 1801, 4 ships from Toulon's division were sent to Cádiz to join Rear Admiral Dumanoir's divisions. This small squadron was commanded by Charles Alexandre Léon Durand de Linois, the only sailor from the Consulate and the Empire who could boast of a victory and who had fought in all the wars of American Independence. On 3 July 1801, a short distance from Gibraltar, Linois sailed towards Cádiz and seized an English brig commanded by Lord Cochrane, who informed him that a strong enemy division was blocking the port he was heading for.

Admiral Sir James Saumarez was ordered to go immediately to the strait with a division of 6 ships, to oppose the passage of the French. Unwilling to take the risk of fighting an opponent much stronger than himself, Linois took up position under the ramparts of Algeciras; the first battle of Algeciras began on 6 July 1801. The battle, which began at 8:15 am, continued until 2 am with equal determination on both sides. Linois' victory did not receive the reward it deserved.

This victory was only the first episode of Rear Admiral Linois' expedition; his ships had suffered too much to think of continuing on to Cádiz. For his part, Admiral Saumarez, who had taken refuge in Gibraltar, was eager to repair the damage caused by such an unexpected defeat; with extraordinary speed, he repaired his ships and replaced the losses he had suffered with choice sailors. Linois was no less active in repairing his ships, but, less happy than his opponent, he was unable to procure sailors and his position became difficult. He wrote to Rear Admiral Dumanoir and Captain General Mazaredo to ask for help; it took a long time before he received an answer. Losing patience, Linois complained bitterly about their inaction.

This slowness produced the results Linois had predicted; the English fleet was ready for battle when the French left Algeciras on 12 July 1801, at two o'clock in the afternoon, to reach Cádiz. The second battle of Algeciras began and the struggle lasted a long, bitter, furious time. At half-past twelve the next day, the British squadron set sail; at two in the afternoon of the same day, the Formidable, with Linois on board, was the last French ship to enter the port of Cádiz, to the shouts of enthusiasm of the people who had watched the battle from the ramparts and the beach. After the battle, Dumanoir was reprimanded for failing to reinforce Linois.

As soon as the Peace of Amiens was signed on 25 March 1802, Bonaparte set about taking back the rich French colony of Santo Domingo, which had been in revolt against France for more than eight years. It was the Santo Domingo expedition of which Dumanoir was a member. On 11 December 1803, Rear Admiral Dumanoir was made a member of the Legion of Honour. While stranded in Toulon on the Formidable, on 24 Brumaire in the year XII (16 November 1803) he asked his first cousin Georges René Le Peley de Pléville, then a senator, who had intervened on 6 Frimaire in the year XII (28 November 1803) with de Lacépède, Grand Chancellor of the Order and also a senator.

== First French Empire ==
The French Empire was proclaimed on 18 May 1804 by the Constitution of the Year XII. Rear Admiral Dumanoir was promoted to Commander of the Legion of Honour on 14 June 1804. On the death of Admiral de Latouche-Tréville on 20 August 1804, he was aboard the Formidable and was provisionally in command of the Toulon squadron and hoped to retain command. However, the Emperor called Vice-Admiral de Villeneuve there. A letter from Napoleon dated 28 August 1804 gives the reasons for it:

« Saint-Cloud, 10 fructidor an XII.
Monsieur Decrès, ministre de la marine,
Il me semble qu'il n'y a pas un moment à perdre pour envoyer un amiral commander l'escadre de Toulon. Elle ne peut être plus mal qu'elle n'est aujourd'hui entre les mains de Dumanoir, qui n'est ni capable de maintenir la discipline dans une aussi grande escadre, ni de la faire agir. Il me paraît que, pour commander cette escadre, il n'y a que trois hommes : Bruix, Villeneuve et Rosily… »
"Saint-Cloud, 10 fructidor year XII.
Monsieur Decrès, Minister of the Navy,
It seems to me that there is not a moment to lose to send an admiral to command the Toulon squadron. It can't be any worse than it is today in the hands of Dumanoir, who is neither capable of maintaining discipline in such a large squadron, nor of making it act. It seems to me that, to command this squadron, there are only three men: Bruix, Villeneuve and Rosily...".

— Napoleon

In 1804, Napoleon ordered Villeneuve, now a Vice Admiral stationed at Toulon, to escape from the British blockade, overcome the British fleet in the English Channel, and allow the planned invasion of Britain to take place. To draw off the British defences, Villeneuve was to sail to the West Indies, where it was planned that he would combine with the Spanish fleet and the French fleet from Brest and attack British possessions in the Caribbean, before returning across the Atlantic to destroy the British Channel squadrons and escort the Armée d'Angleterre from their camp at Boulogne to victory in England.

After an abortive expedition in January 1805, Villeneuve finally left Toulon on 29 March with eleven ships of the line. He evaded Nelson's blockade, passed the Strait of Gibraltar on 8 April and crossed the Atlantic with Nelson's fleet in pursuit, but about a month behind owing to unfavourable winds. Dumanoir was thirty-five years old; since leaving Toulon he had been part of Villeneuve's squadron as a rear admiral commanding the Formidable.

In the West Indies Villeneuve waited for a month at Martinique, but Admiral Ganteaume's Brest fleet did not appear, being hermetically blocked there. On 11 June Villeneuve set out for Europe with Nelson again in pursuit. On 22 July Villeneuve, now with twenty ships of the line and seven frigates, passed Cape Finisterre on the northwest coast of Spain and entered the Bay of Biscay. Here he met a British fleet of fifteen ships of the line commanded by Vice Admiral Sir Robert Calder. In the ensuing Battle of Cape Finisterre, a confused action in bad visibility, the British, though outnumbered, were able to cut off and capture two Spanish ships. In this battle Dumanoir was placed behind the flagship in thirteenth position; his ship was not engaged in the cannonade.

For two days Villeneuve shadowed the retreating British, but did not seek a battle. Instead he sailed to A Coruña, arriving on 1 August. Here he received orders from Napoleon to sail to Brest and Boulogne as planned. Instead, perhaps believing a false report of a superior British fleet in the Bay of Biscay, and against the Spanish commanders' objections, he sailed away back to Cádiz, rendering Napoleon's planned invasion of Britain wholly impossible.

Villeneuve, who had retired to Cádiz with the combined squadrons of France and Spain, learned that the Emperor had just sent Vice-Admiral de Rosily by land to replace him in his command. Secretly warned by Navy Minister Decrès, he hoped to prevent this disgrace by a bold move, and Villeneuve, until now so irresolute, took the decision to throw himself headlong into the enemy, rather than return to France with a mark of shame on his forehead. Inexperienced crews and the difficulties of getting out of Cádiz meant that it took two days to get all 34 ships out of port and in some kind of order. On 21 October 1805, Villeneuve met the English squadron at Cape Trafalgar. Its fleet consisted of thirty-three ships, five frigates and two brigs. Dumanoir was aboard the ship Formidable, from which he commanded a division that was initially placed in the rearguard where the most appalling confusion reigned. But following a lof-for-lof transfer, his division found itself in the vanguard of the Franco-Spanish fleet and was spared by Nelson's attack which cut the centre and the rearguard.

As soon as the wind allowed him, Dumanoir went to the aid of the Bucentaure and the Santísima Trinidad. He found the two vessels completely dismasted. The Formidable had suffered a great deal herself and was making six feet of water an hour. Her mast was ready to fall and was only held back by the shrouds. In this situation, Dumanoir simply decided to hold the wind and sent a signal to the other ships in his fleet to do the same. Other authors write that he remained a motionless spectator even though he still had the Formidable, the Duguay-Trouin, the Scipion and the Mont Blanc under his command, and that he walked away without fighting.

Only the Intrépide of Captain Infernet and the Neptuno of Captain Valdés disobeyed him and threw themselves into the heart of the battle, to their loss. Dumanoir's four other ships crossed at close quarters and moved away without much fighting. When he saw only English men on the battlefield and the allied squadron was no longer in sight, Dumanoir had his squadron take the western flank. Ten days passed according to the strength of the winds while the wing tried to repair the damage. The Formidable, which continued to make six to seven feet of water per hour, had to throw her battery of forecastles and 22 guns out of service into the sea.

Thus the Formidable, in complete disrepair, and the three ships that followed her, encountered an enemy flotilla of four ships and four frigates on 5 November, under Cape Ortegal. Dumanoir fought against Commodore Strachan, lost his four ships, forced to surrender after a bloody battle lasting nearly five hours and wounded in the head, fell to the English. The Duguay-Trouin, the Formidable, the Mont Blanc and the Scipion were taken to Plymouth. In this fight, Dumanoir received three serious injuries.

He remained for some time a prisoner on parole and returned to France in July 1806 where his conduct during the Trafalgar campaign was strongly condemned, particularly by some of the surviving captains (Lucas, Infernet, and Villeneuve himself). He remained unassigned, was brought before a board of enquiry in December 1809, and reprimanded; he demanded to appear before a maritime war council composed of senators Fleuriot and Bougainville and admirals Thévenard and de Rosily in March 1810, he was acquitted.

Dumanoir explained the retreat of his ships as a measure of prudence: "To arrive at this moment on the enemy, would have been a blow of despair which would only have resulted in increasing the number of our losses and adding to the advantage of the enemy, to whom by the dilapidation of my division I would not have been able to cause much damage".

The commission concluded that :

- Dumanoir had manoeuvred in accordance with the signals he had received and that he had followed the impulse of duty and honour.
- That he had done what the winds and circumstances had allowed him to do to come to the rescue of the flagship.
- That he had fought as closely as possible against all the ships he had dealt with.
- Finally, he had only left the battle when he was forced to do so by the damage to his ship and the impossibility of manoeuvring in the state his mast was in.

Napoleon refused to employ him, as he felt, like public opinion, that he was being held in contempt. However, the conclusions of the council of war held in Toulon were taken into account by Napoleon himself. In 1811, he appointed him commander of the navy at Danzig and the charge of the direction of the convoys on the Vistula. During the blockade of Danzig, he rendered services. After a year's siege, the square capitulated and Dumanoir, who had been wounded in the head by a bomb, was taken prisoner to Kyiv. It was from there that he sent his support for the acts of the senate which decreed the disqualification of the Emperor and the recall of the Bourbons.

== Bourbon Restoration ==
Returning to France in July 1814, he received the title of Count from King Louis XVIII during the first First Restoration by letters patent dated 2 December 1814; he was made a Knight of Saint-Louis in 1815. He then commanded the naval division that led the Marquis de Rivière, Louis XVIII's ambassador to Constantinople. An order of 22 August 1816 had reduced the number of counter-admirals from 21 to 12. In 1817, in accordance with this order, the list of general officers to be retained was drawn up: Dumanoir was the first on it.

On 24 April of the same year, he was raised to the dignity of Grand Officer of the Legion of Honour. Louis XVIII appointed him vice-admiral in 1819 and, on 23 August 1820, Commander of Saint-Louis.

During the Second Restoration, Dumanoir was elected on 22 August 1815 as deputy for the Manche département college in the "Chambre introuvable" - 1st legislature from 7 October 1815 to 5 September 1816 - and sat in the centre. Re-elected on 20 September 1817 - 2nd legislature from 4 November 1816 to 24 December 1823 - he remained in office until 17 August 1822, sitting obscurely in the centre.

He died suddenly in Paris during the night of 6–7 July 1829 and was buried in the Père Lachaise cemetery (19th division).

== Honours ==
- Grand officier of the Legion of Honour (24 April 1817)
- Commandeur of the Order of Saint Louis
