= HMS Namur (1756) =

Ship of the line of the Royal Navy

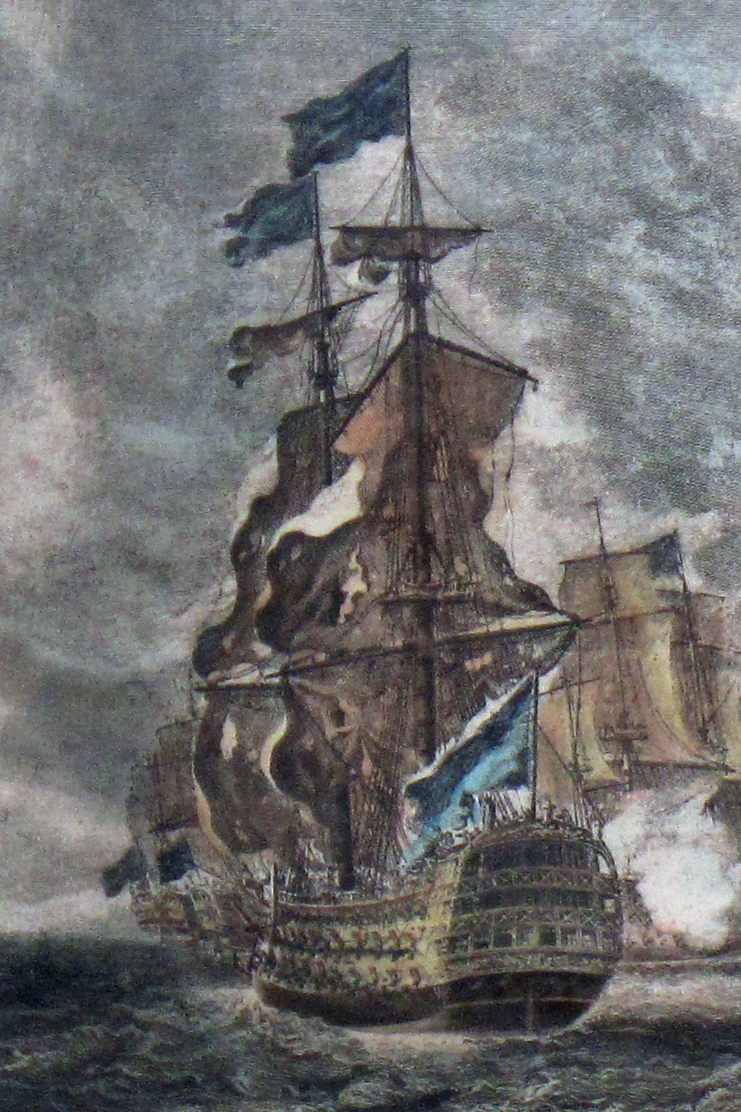
- HMS Namur at the Battle of Lagos, 1759

History

Great Britain
- Name: Namur
- Ordered: 12 July 1750
- Builder: Chatham Dockyard
- Laid down: 18 December 1750
- Launched: 3 March 1756
- Commissioned: May 1756
- Fate: Broken up, May 1833
- Notes: Participated in: Siege of Louisbourg (1758); Battle of Havana (1762); Battle of Cape St Vincent (1797); Battle of Lagos; Affair of Fielding and Bylandt; Battle of the Saintes

General characteristics
- Class & type: 90-gun second rate ship of the line
- Tons burthen: 1814 bm
- Length: 175 ft (53.3 m) (gundeck)
- Beam: 48 ft 6 in (14.8 m)
- Depth of hold: 20 ft 6 in (6.2 m)
- Propulsion: Sails
- Sail plan: Full-rigged ship
- Armament: 90 guns: Gundeck: 26 × 32 pdrs; Middle gundeck: 26 × 18 pdrs; Upper gundeck: 26 × 12 pdrs; Quarterdeck: 10 × 6 pdrs; Forecastle: 2 × 6 pdrs

HMS Namur was a 90-gun second-rate ship of the line of the Royal Navy, built at Chatham Dockyard to the draught specified by the 1745 Establishment as amended in 1750, and launched on 3 March 1756. HMS Namur’s battle honours surpass even those of the more famous HMS Victory.

== History ==
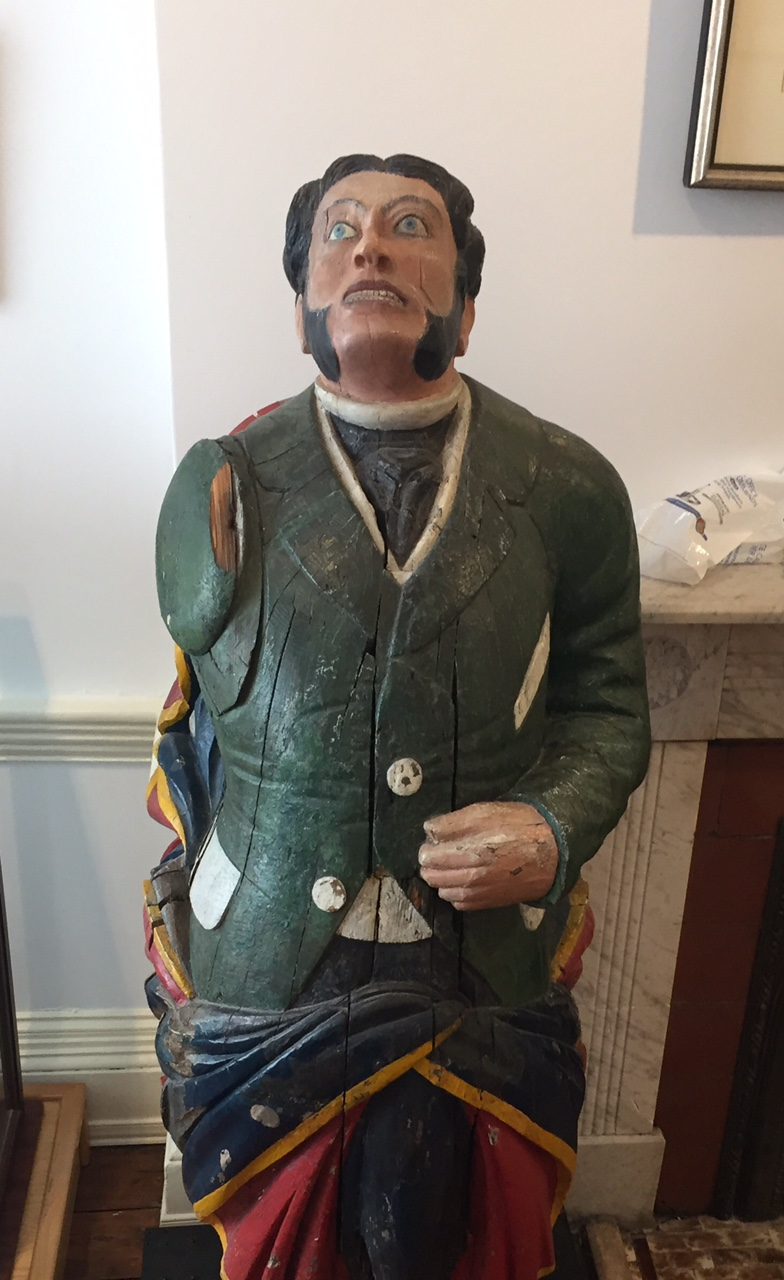
HMS Namur figurehead, Naval Museum of Halifax, CFB Halifax, Nova Scotia, Canada

Namur was the flagship of Vice-Admiral Edward Boscawen in the capture of Louisburg in 1758. General James Wolfe had sailed across the Atlantic in Namur on this occasion before his capture of Quebec. Also on this journey was 6th Lieutenant Michael Henry Pascal, with his slave and servant Olaudah Equiano (called Gustavus Vasser at the time - this was the slave name given him by Pascal). In his book, Equiano wrote that the ceremony of surrender was "the most beautiful procession on the water I ever saw", and gives more detail of the occasion. In 1758, fifteen Namur sailors were tried and condemned to death by hanging for mutiny; they had protested to be replaced aboard another ship. The King's grace reprieved them from death penalty, except for one sailor.

Namur was the flagship of Admiral Sir George Pocock in the Battle of Havana (1762).

Namur fought in the Battle of Cape St Vincent (1797) under the command of Captain James Hawkins-Whitshed. Namur was astern of HMS Captain, under the command of then Commodore Horatio Nelson, at the beginning stages of the battle.

Namur was razeed to a 74-gun ship in 1805, and took part in the naval engagement of 4 November 1805 (the Battle of Cape Ortegal), when the remnants of the French and Spanish fleet which had escaped from Trafalgar was engaged by Lord Strachan's squadron; she took on and captured the French warship Formidable. She was placed on harbour service in 1807 and remained in this role until 1833, when she was finally broken up.

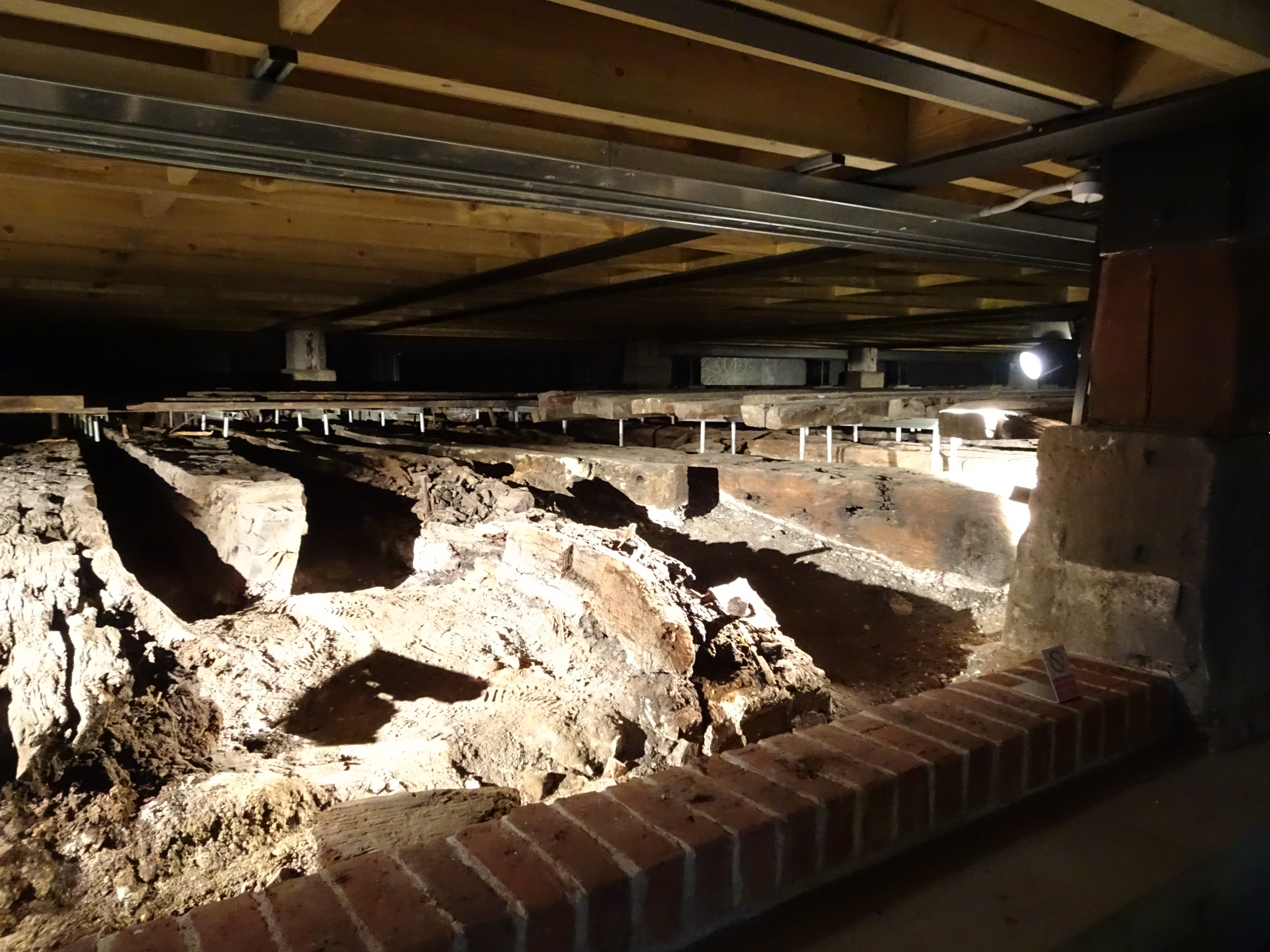
Timbers of the Namur at Chatham)

Some of Namur's timbers were used to support the floor of the wheelwright's workshop at Chatham Dockyard. They were rediscovered there in 1995 and identified in 2003. The timbers represent approximately a quarter of the Namur 's frame and are from a contiguous section of the ship's orlop deck and adjacent hull frames. While deck beams were repurposed to form and support the floor of the wheelright's shop, many others were placed in the gaps between these beams and serve no structural purpose, including many of the ship's futtock and knee timbers. Evidence suggests that the timbers were removed sequentially from the Namur as the ship was dismantled and directly installed under the workshop. While repurposing of ship timbers for structural purposes ashore was very common, the rediscovered timbers of the Namur are rare in being entirely unmodified, still bearing original carpenter's marks, traces of red paint common to Royal Navy warship lower deck interiors of the period, numbers denoting sailor's hammock berths, hammock hooks and lengths of oakum. The presence of many superfluous lengths of timber in and under the new workshop floor and their unaltered condition has been suggested as a deliberate form of preservation by workers at the Dockyard at the time, in recognition of the fame of the Namur and its prestigious service record. It is possible that the preservation and hiding of as much fabric as possible from the Namur was officially sanctioned by the Captain Superintendent of Chatham Dockyard, James Alexander Gordon, who had served on the ship during the Battle of Cape St. Vincent in 1797. The restored timbers form the centerpiece of the "Command of the Oceans" gallery at the Chatham Historic Dockyard museum opened in 2016.

== Notable crewmembers ==
- The marine painter Clarkson Stanfield served on board the ship, after being pressed into the Royal Navy in 1808. He was discharged on health grounds in 1814.
- One of Namur's captains was Charles Austen, a brother of Jane Austen.
- Olaudah Equiano, a former African slave who was active in the British abolitionist movement, served as a powder monkey on Namur.

== Bibliography ==
- Adkin, Mark (2005). The Trafalgar Companion: A Guide to History's Most Famous Sea Battle and the Life of Admiral Lord Nelson. Aurum Press. ISBN 1-84513-018-9.
- Baines, Stephen (2015). Captain Cook's Merchant Ships; Freelove, Three Brothers, Mary, Friendship, Endeavour, Adventure, Resolution and Discovery. The History Press. ISBN 978-0-75096-214-8.
- Colledge, J. J.; Warlow, Ben & Bush, Steve (2020). Ships of the Royal Navy: The Complete Record of all Fighting Ships of the Royal Navy from the 15th Century to the Present (5th revised and updated ed.). Seaforth Publishing. ISBN 978-1-5267-9327-0.
- Lavery, Brian (1984). The Ship of the Line. Vol. 1: The Development of the Battlefleet 1650–1850. Naval Institute Press. ISBN 0-85177-252-8.
- Winfield, Rif (2007). British Warships in the Age of Sail 1714–1792: Design, Construction, Careers and Fates. Seaforth Publishing. ISBN 978-1-84415-700-6.
