= Aaron Tozer =

Captain Aaron Tozer
- Born: 1788
- Died: 1854

Aaron Tozer (1788–1854) was a captain in the Royal Navy.

== Life ==
Tozer was born in 1788. He entered the Navy in June 1801 on board HMS Phoebe, with Captain Thomas Baker, on the Irish station. He afterwards served in the East Indies and on the home station, and, again with Baker, in HMS Phoenix, in the action of 10 August 1805 he was present at the capture of the French frigate Didon, then carrying important despatches from Vice-Admiral Pierre-Charles Villeneuve at Ferrol to Rochefort. Tozer was dangerously wounded in the shoulder, and, after passing his examination, was specially promoted to be lieutenant on 11 August 1807. After serving in the 74-gun HMS York at the reduction of Madeira and in the West Indies, he was appointed, in December 1808, to HMS Victorious, in which he took part in the Walcheren expedition in July and August 1809; and afterwards in the Mediterranean, in the defence of Sicily, June to September 1810, during which time he was repeatedly engaged in actions between the boats and the vessels of Murat's flotilla; and on 22 February 1812 at the capture of Rivoli (see also Sir John Talbot). In February 1813 he was appointed to Undaunted, and during the following months repeatedly commanded her boats in storming the enemy's batteries or cutting out trading and armed vessels from under their protection.

On 18 August 1813 in an attack, in force, on the batteries of Cassis, when the citadel battery was carried by escalade and three gunboats and twenty-four merchant vessels were brought out. Tozer was severely wounded by a canister shot in the groin and by a musket shot in the left hand. In consequence of these wounds he was invalided; on 15 July 1814 was promoted to commander, and in December 1815 awarded a pension of £150 a year. From 1818 to 1822 he commanded HMS Cyrene in the West Indies; in 1829 the yacht William & Mary.

On 14 January 1830 he was promoted to post rank, but had no further employment. He died in Plymouth on 21 February 1854.

== Family ==
In June 1827 he married Mary, eldest daughter of Henry Hutton of Lincoln, and had one son, the Rev. Henry Fanshawe Tozer, fellow of Exeter College, Oxford. (Note: O'Byrne's Nav. Biogr. Dictionary) (Note: Marshall's Roy. Nav. Biogr. x. (volume iii. part ii.) 110) (Note: Gentlemen's Magazine 1854, ii. 77) (Note: James's Naval History) (Note: Navy Lists.)
