= Henry Fanshawe Tozer =

British geographer (1829–1916)

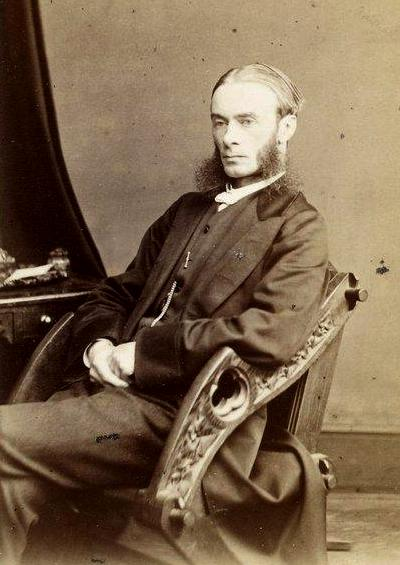
Henry Fanshawe Tozer in 1883

The Reverend Henry Fanshawe Tozer, FBA (18 May 1829 – 2 June 1916) was a British writer, teacher, traveller, and geographer. His 1897 History of Ancient Geography was well-regarded.

== Biography ==
Tozer was born in Plymouth, Devon, the eldest son of Capt. Aaron Tozer of the Royal Navy. After graduating from Exeter College, Oxford, in 1850, he was tutor there from 1855 to 1893 and was also curator of the Taylor Institution (Oxford) from 1869 to 1893. His brother-in-law was Ernest Mason Satow. Fanshawe had a particular interest "in the intersection of geography and the classics". He travelled much in Greece and in European and Asiatic Turkey.

He died in 1916 in Oxfordshire. His funeral service was held in Exeter College Chapel. He was interred at Holywell Cemetery in Oxford.

== Works ==
- Researches in the Highlands of Turkey (two volumes, 1869)
- Lectures on the Geography of Greece (1873)
- Primer of Classical Geography (1877)
- Finlay, George, A History of Greece from its Conquest by the Romans to the Present Time : B.C. 146 to A.D. 1864, rev. by Tozer, Henry Fanshawe, 7 vols. (Oxford: Clarendon Press, 1877)
- Turkish Armenia and Eastern Asia Minor (1881)
- The Church and the Eastern Empire (1888)
- The Islands of the Ægean (1890)
- Selections from Strabo (1893)
- History of Ancient Geography (1897)
- An English Commentary on Dante's Divina Commedia (1901)
- Translation of the Divina Commedia (1904)
