= HMS Didon =

Frigate of the Royal Navy

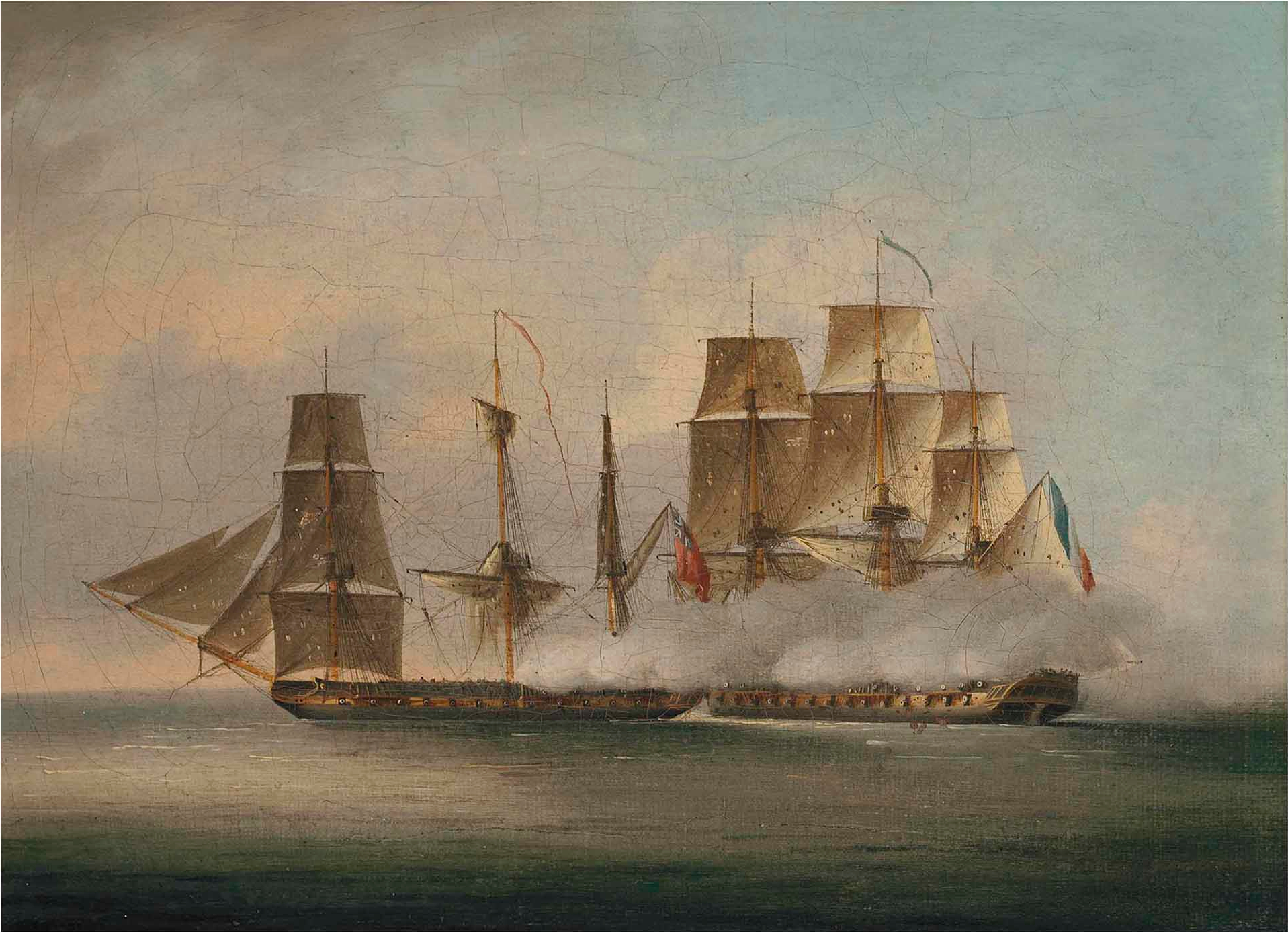
- Didon (right) at the action of 10 August 1805

History

France
- Name: Didon
- Namesake: Dido
- Builder: Enterprise Ethéart, Saint Malo (Construteurs: François Pestel and Pierre Ozanne)
- Laid down: September 1796
- Launched: 1 August 1799
- Captured: on 10 August 1805

United Kingdom
- Name: HMS Didon
- In service: Captured on 10 August 1805
- Fate: Broken up August 1811

General characteristics
- Class & type: Virginie-class frigate
- Displacement: 1,390 tonneaux
- Tons burthen: 720 port tonneaux; 1,09042/94 (bm)
- Length: 153 ft 0 in (46.6 m) (overall); 124 ft 7 1/8 in (38.0 m) (keel)
- Beam: 40 ft 1 in (12.2 m)
- Depth of hold: 12 ft 10 in (3.9 m)
- Sail plan: Full-rigged ship
- Complement: French service:340 (war), 260 (peace); British service: 284; 300 (later)
- Armament: French service: British service: Upper deck:28 × 18-pounder guns; QD: 6 × 9-pounder guns + 32-pounder carronades; Fc: 2 × 9-pounder guns + 2 × 32-pounder carronades

Didon was a Virginie-class 40-gun frigate of the French Navy. Captured by the British in 1805, she went on to serve briefly in the Royal Navy as the 38-gun fifth-rate HMS Didon until she was sold in 1810.

== French service ==
Laid down in 1796 as Fâcheuse, she was renamed to Didon in 1799, the year of her launch.

On 13 October 1803, she captured the British privateer brig Laurel.

Didon later took part in the Battle of Cape Finisterre in 1805.

=== Capture ===
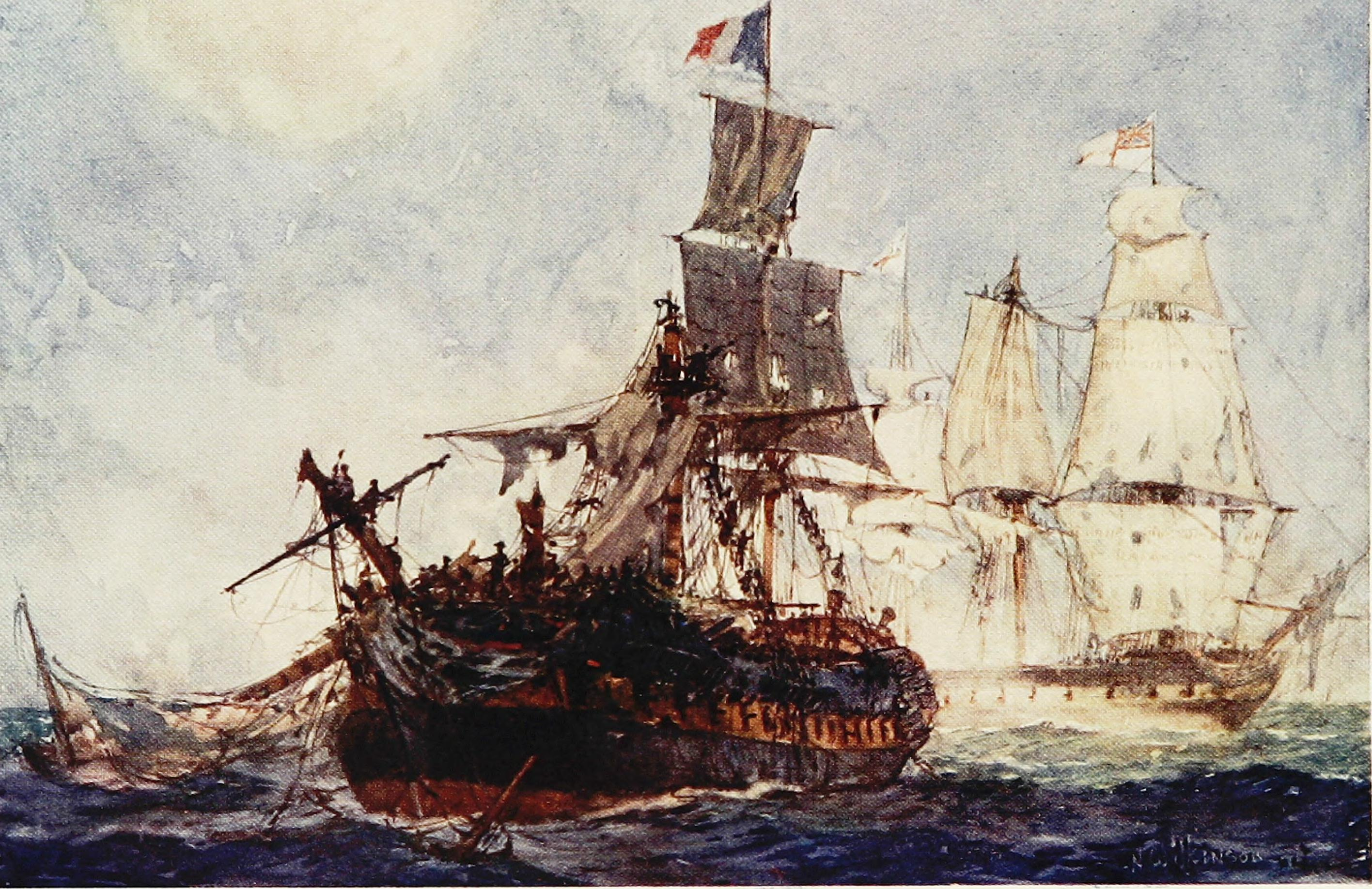
The battered Didon about to strike her colours

While attempting to rejoin the French fleet of Allemand's expedition of 1805, she encountered HMS Phoenix, Captain Thomas Baker, on 10 August 1805, off Cape Finisterre, and struck at 43°16′N 12°14′W.

Captain Milius, of Didon, maneuvered adroitly, and casualties on both sides were heavy. The 4-hour fight cost Didon 27 men killed and 44 wounded. Phoenix lost 12 men killed and 28 wounded. Lloyd's Patriotic Fund awarded Baker a sword worth 100 guineas. In 1847 the Admiralty awarded the Naval General Service Medal with clasp, "Phoenix 10 Augt. 1805".

Baker took Didon in tow and sailed towards Gibraltar. By good fortune and skillful sailing he avoided encountering the Franco-Spanish fleet that had just left Cádiz. Instead of continuing onward, Baker changed direction and sailed for England.

== British service and fate ==
Didon arrived at Plymouth on 4 September 1805. The Navy took her into British service as HMS Didon; she is the only ship of the Royal Navy to have borne this name. The Royal Navy commissioned Didon under the command of Captain Thomas Baker in November. She was paid off in 1807 and placed into Ordinary the same year. The Navy commenced major repairs on Didon in May, but then cancelled the work. Didon was broken up in August 1811.
