= Thomas Baker (Royal Navy officer) =

Officer of the Royal Navy (1771–1845)

Vice-Admiral Sir Thomas Baker KCB
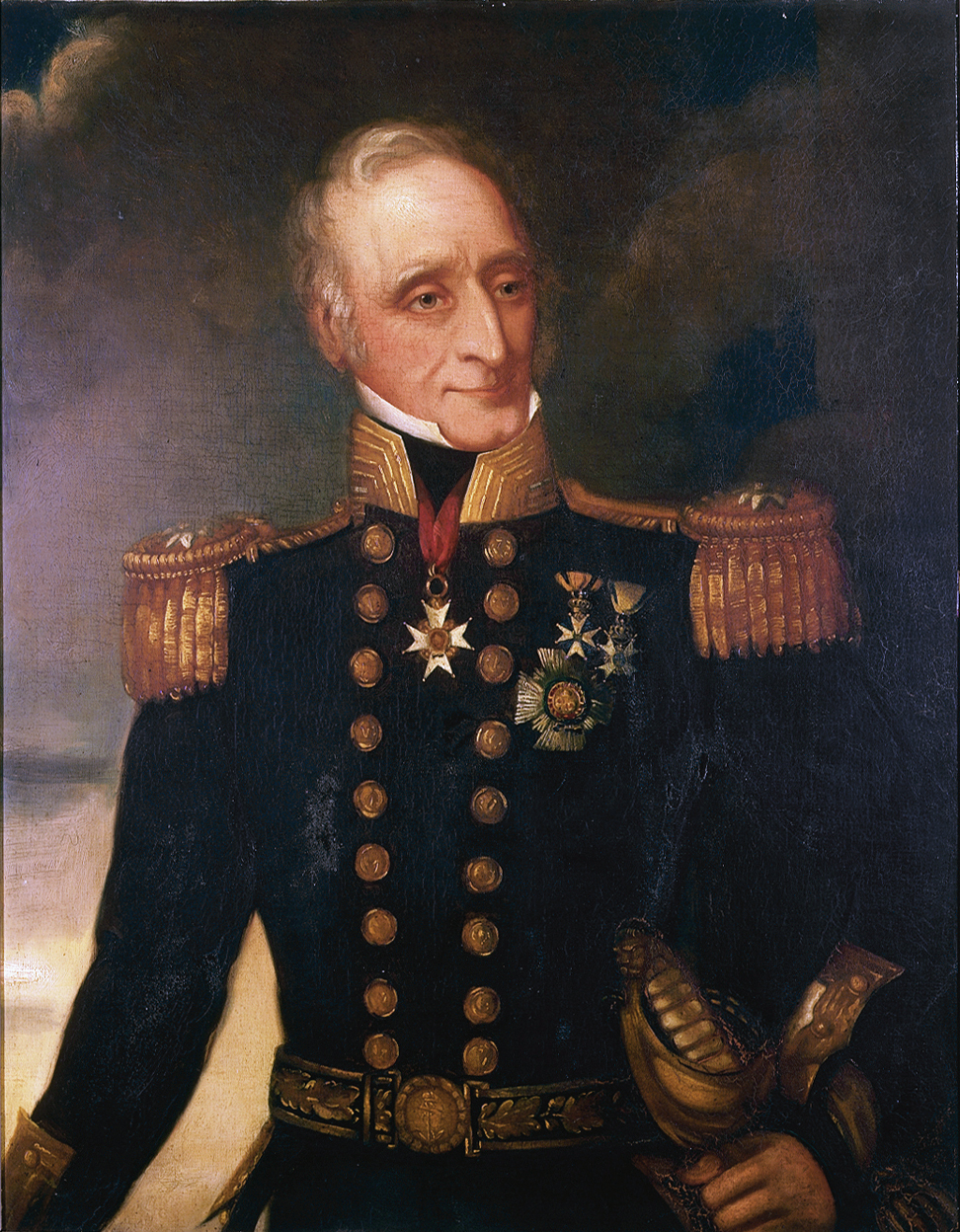
- Portrait of Baker
- Born: 1771; Kent, England
- Died: 26 January 1845 (aged 73–74); Walmer, Kent
- Military career
- Allegiance: Great Britain; United Kingdom
- Branch: Royal Navy
- Service years: 1781–1845
- Rank: Vice-admiral
- Commands: HMS Fairy; HMS Princess Royal; HMS Nemesis; HMS Phoebe; HMS Phoenix; HMS Didon; HMS Tribune; HMS Vanguard; HMS Cumberland
- Conflicts: Battle of Cape Ortegal
- Awards: Knight Commander of the Order of the Bath; Knight of the Military Order of Wilhelm

Vice-Admiral Sir Thomas Baker KCB (1771 – 26 January 1845) was a Royal Navy officer who served in the American War of Independence and the French Revolutionary and Napoleonic Wars. He had obtained his own command during the French Revolutionary Wars and was to play a part in bringing about three of the battles of the Napoleonic Wars, the Battle of Copenhagen, the Battle of Trafalgar, and the Battle of Cape Ortegal. He only directly participated in the third, but his actions there, and the capture of the French frigate Didon beforehand brought him honours and rewards.

While towing Didon to a British port, he and another vessel were sighted by the combined Franco-Spanish fleet under Pierre-Charles Villeneuve, and mistaken as scouts for the Channel Fleet. He therefore turned south to Cádiz, leading to the abandonment of the planned invasion of England, and the destruction of the French fleet at Trafalgar by Horatio Nelson some months later. He rose through the ranks after the end of the wars with France, and was commander of the South America Station during Charles Darwin's voyage aboard HMS Beagle. He eventually died with the rank of vice-admiral in 1845 after a long and distinguished career.

== Early life ==
Baker was born in 1771 in Kent, where his family were residents of Walmer. His naval career began on 23 August 1781 when he joined the storeship HMS Dromedary as a midshipman, serving in the Downs under Captain John Stone. He remained with the Dromedary until 26 June 1782, and joined HMS Kite under Captain John Peyton on 17 October that year, also on the Downs station. He and Peyton left Kite on 21 January 1783, as Peyton had been given command of the 74-gun HMS Carnatic, serving with the Channel Fleet. Baker returned to serve under his original commander, Captain Stone, on 15 March 1783, Stone by now commanding the 32-gun fifth rate HMS Hermione. He sailed out to Halifax with her, and left Hermione on 5 October 1785 when she was paid off. The end of the American War of Independence left Baker without a ship, but he was able to gain employment sailing on the ships of the East India Company. This occupation lasted for the next two and half years, until he rejoined the navy on 22 March 1788, serving aboard the 28-gun HMS Dido. He and the Dido sailed to Halifax, where Baker transferred aboard the 24-gun sloop HMS Brisk on 22 July 1790 in order to sail home.

Baker spent the winter of 1790 ashore, but returned to sea on 18 May 1791 when he joined the 100-gun HMS Royal Sovereign at Plymouth. He left the Royal Sovereign on 24 September 1791 to join Captain William Bligh's 64-gun HMS Dictator, but by October he had transferred aboard the 32-gun HMS Winchelsea. Baker and the Winchelsea served in the English Channel until February 1792, when he came ashore. His next posting was in August, when he joined the 38-gun HMS Minerva under Commodore William Cornwallis for service in the East Indies. While serving in the East Indies Baker was commissioned lieutenant, on 13 October 1792, and on 17 October he was appointed to the 10-gun Swan. He returned to England and left her on her being paid off on 23 December 1793. Baker was then appointed as acting-commander of the hired armed cutter Lion.

== Command ==
Baker served in the Channel as part of the forces under Rear-Admiral John MacBride, before moving into the hired armed lugger Valiant on 20 May 1794, and then to HMS Fairy in November as her acting-captain. He was promoted to commander on 24 November 1795 after good service in conveying despatches to the West Indies.

He spent between 1796 and 1797 in the North Sea, after which he was appointed flag captain aboard the 98-gun HMS Princess Royal, the flagship of Sir John Orde. On 12 July he was appointed to command the 28-gun HMS Nemesis, serving in the Downs under Vice-Admiral Joseph Peyton. He was active against French privateers while in command of Nemesis, capturing the 14-gun Renard in the Channel on 12 January 1800, followed by the Modéré some time later. The Nemesis's boats participated in a fireship attack on the French frigates in the Dunkirk Roads on 7 July 1800, but an event of international significance occurred on 25 July 1800.

=== Baker and Copenhagen ===
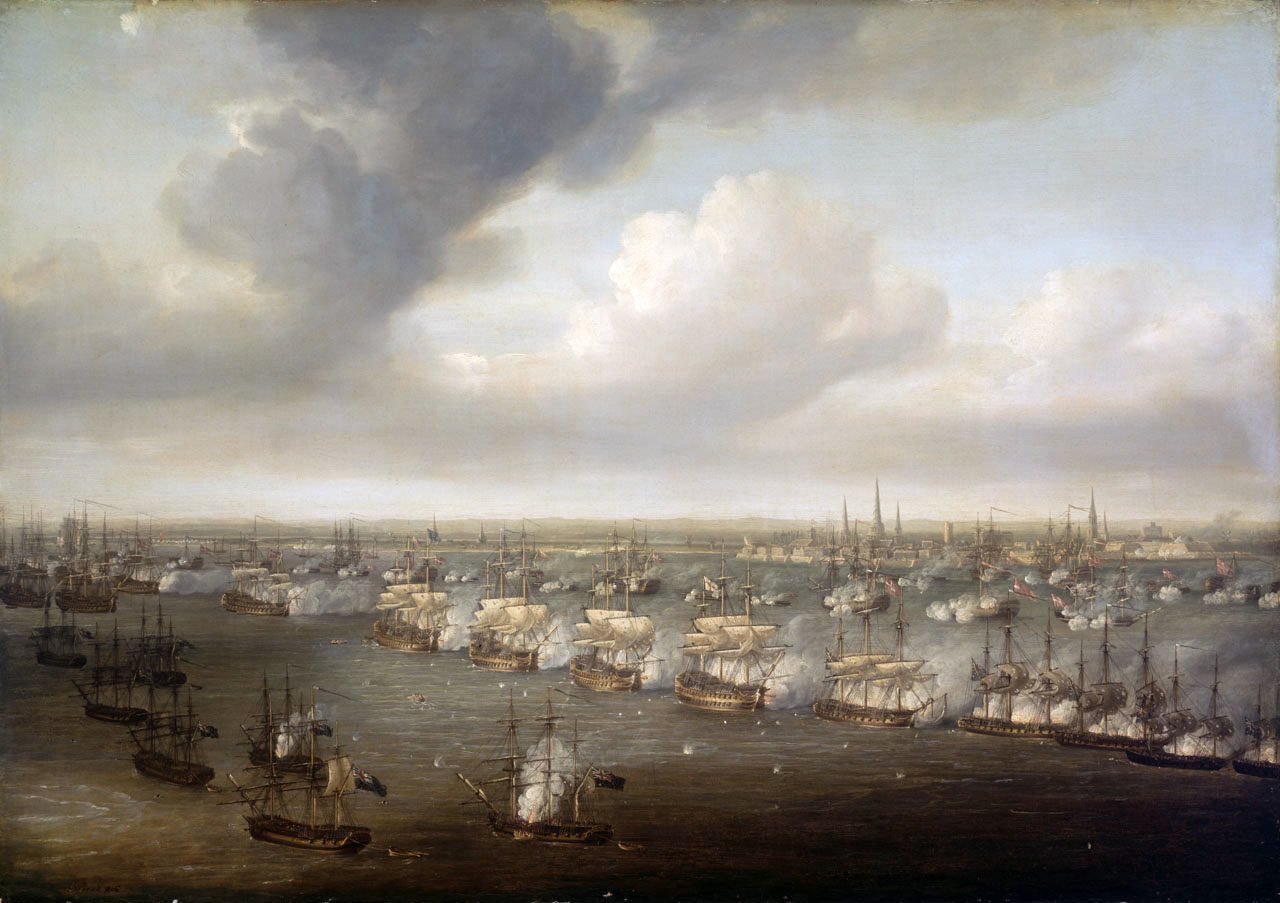
The tensions caused by the British enforcement of the blockade eventually led to the Battle of Copenhagen

Baker and the Nemesis had been assigned to enforce the blockade of naval stores to the French and Dutch dockyards, with a small squadron under his command. On 25 July he approached a convoy of six merchantmen off Ostend, that was being escorted by the 40-gun Danish frigate Freja, and announced his intention to search the merchants, as he suspected them of carrying stores to be used by the French. The commander of the Freja, Captain Krabbe, announced that he would fire on any boat that Baker sent to carry this out. Baker did so anyway and the Danish opened fire, but missed the boat. The shot hit the Nemesis and killed a man. Incensed, Baker ordered a general action and after 25 minutes fighting, subdued the Freja. The Freja and the convoy were escorted into the Downs, where the commander of the station, Vice-Admiral Skeffington Lutwidge, ordered that the Freja continue to fly the Danish colours while the matter was investigated. The heart of the dispute centred over the right of British ships to stop and search merchants. The Danes insisted that a convoy escorted by one of their ships flying a neutral flag, was a guarantee of the cargoes being shipped, except in the approaches to a blockaded port. The British had no reason to trust or fear the Danes and were not inclined to alter this policy, and a diplomatic mission was sent to Copenhagen under Lord Whitworth, accompanied by a fleet under Vice-Admiral Archibald Dickson. The negotiations resulted in the British agreeing to repair and return the Freja, leaving the matter of the rights of searching vessels to be determined later. The incident caused the Russian Tsar, Paul I, to place an embargo on British goods, though this was lifted three weeks later. Simmering discontent over the unresolved matter of British rights in enforcing the blockades led to the Danes, Swedes and Russians forming the Second League of Armed Neutrality. In response the British despatched a fleet under Sir Hyde Parker and Horatio Nelson to force the Danes to withdraw from the League, which resulted in the Battle of Copenhagen. Baker's actions were approved of by the Admiralty, and on 26 May 1801 he was appointed to command the 36-gun HMS Phoebe. The Phoebe was assigned to the Irish station, where Baker remained until 27 May 1802.

=== Baker and Trafalgar ===
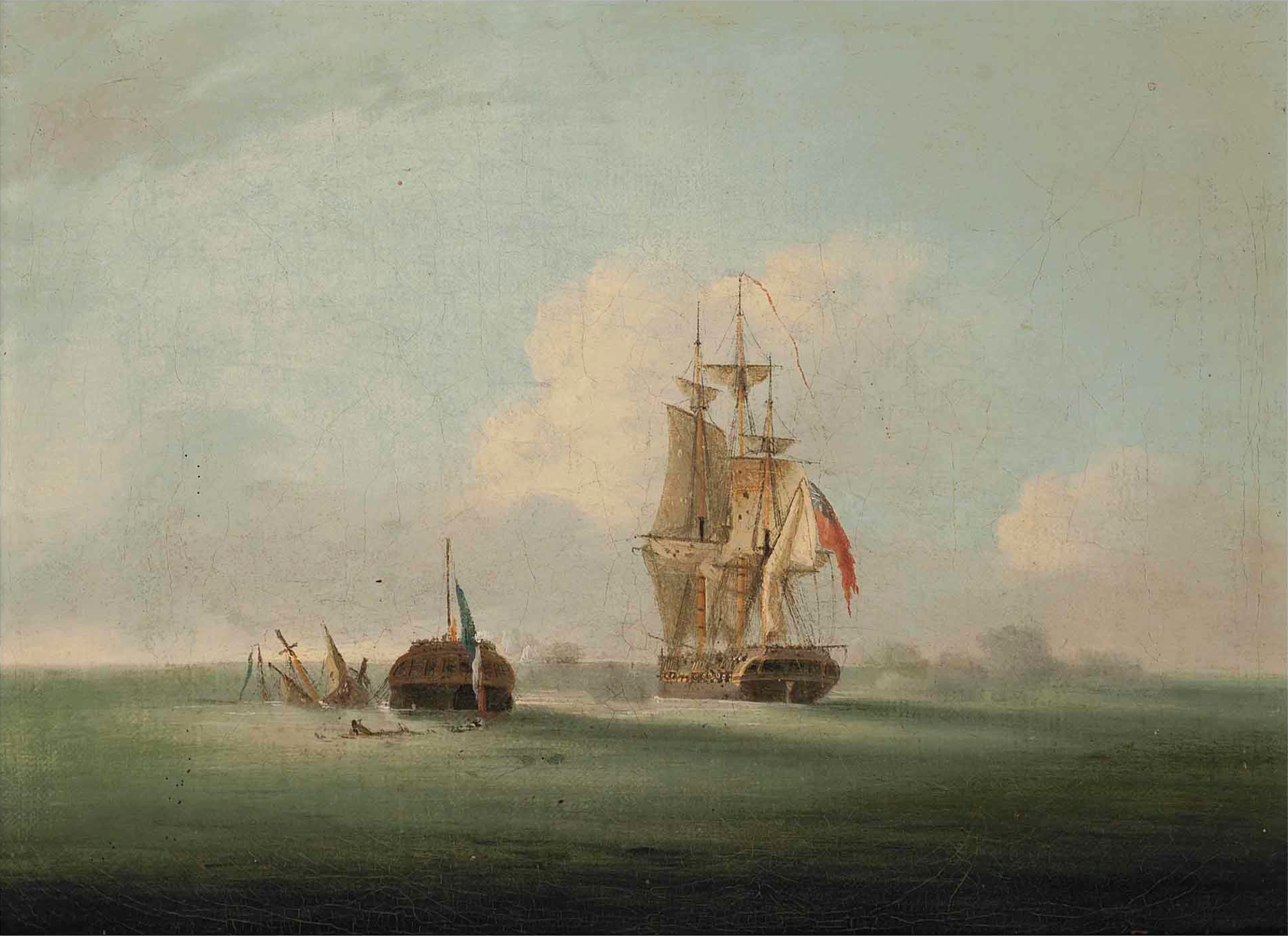
The capture of La Didon by H.M. frigate Phoenix, Francis Sartorius Jr.

The Peace of Amiens temporarily left Baker without a ship, but he returned to active service with the resumption of hostilities, taking command of the 36-gun HMS Phoenix on 28 April 1803. He was assigned to the Channel Fleet under Admiral William Cornwallis, and on 10 August 1805 he came across the 40-gun French frigate Didon off Cape Finisterre. Prior to the sighting the Phoenix had intercepted an American merchant, en route from Bordeaux to the United States. The American master had been invited onto the Phoenix, sold the British some of his cargo of wine, and had toured the Phoenix before being allowed to continue on his way. The Phoenix had at this time been altered to resemble from a distance a large sloop of war. The Didon, which was carrying despatches instructing Rear-Admiral Allemand's five ships of the line to unite with the combined Franco-Spanish fleet under Vice-Admiral Pierre-Charles Villeneuve, intercepted the American merchant and from him received news that a 20-gun British frigate was at sea and might be foolish enough to attack the Didon. The Didon's commander, Captain Milius, decided to await the arrival of the British ship, and take her as a prize. The Phoenix was therefore able to approach and engage the Didon before the French realised that she was a larger frigate than they had anticipated. After a sharp action lasting several hours, with Baker on one occasion having his hat shot off his head, the French surrendered. The Phoenix had 12 killed and 28 wounded, the French sustained losses of 27 killed and 44 wounded. By intercepting the ship carrying the despatches for Allemand, Baker had unwittingly played a role in bringing about the battle of Trafalgar, but he was to play an even greater role a few days later, possibly even staving off an invasion of England.

While sailing to Gibraltar with his prize in tow, Baker fell in with the 74-gun HMS Dragon on 14 August. The following day the three ships were sighted by the combined fleet under Villeneuve, heading for Brest and then on to Boulogne to escort the French invasion forces across the Channel. Villeneuve mistook the British ships for scouts from the Channel Fleet, and fled south to avoid an action. A furious Napoleon raged 'What a Navy! What an admiral! All those sacrifices for nought!' Villeneuve's failure to press north was a decisive point of the Trafalgar Campaign as far as the invasion of England went, for abandoning all hope of fulfilling his plans to secure control of the Channel Napoleon gathered the Armée d'Angleterre, now renamed the Grande Armée, and headed east to attack the Austrians in the Ulm Campaign. The British ships altered their course and made for Plymouth, where they arrived on 3 September, having prevented an attempt by their French prisoners to capture the Phoenix and retake the Didon.

=== Baker and Cape Ortegal ===
Baker resumed his service in the Bay of Biscay, and on 2 November he was discovered off Cape Finisterre by four French ships of the line under Pierre Dumanoir le Pelley, that had escaped from the destruction of the Franco-Spanish fleet at Trafalgar two weeks previously. They chased the Phoenix southwards, with Baker trying to lure them towards a British squadron he knew to be in the area, under Captain Sir Richard Strachan. He made contact with Strachan's forces later that day, and was sent by Strachan to round up the rest of the scattered squadron while Strachan took the bulk of his force in pursuit. The British eventually closed on the fleeing French on 4 November, whereupon Phoenix joined the other frigates in harassing the French, until Strachan could bring his larger ships in action. The frigates then attacked one side of the French line, with the ships of the line engaging the other, until the French were forced to surrender. The Phoenix was one of the ships taking possession of Scipion.

== Rewards and later commands ==
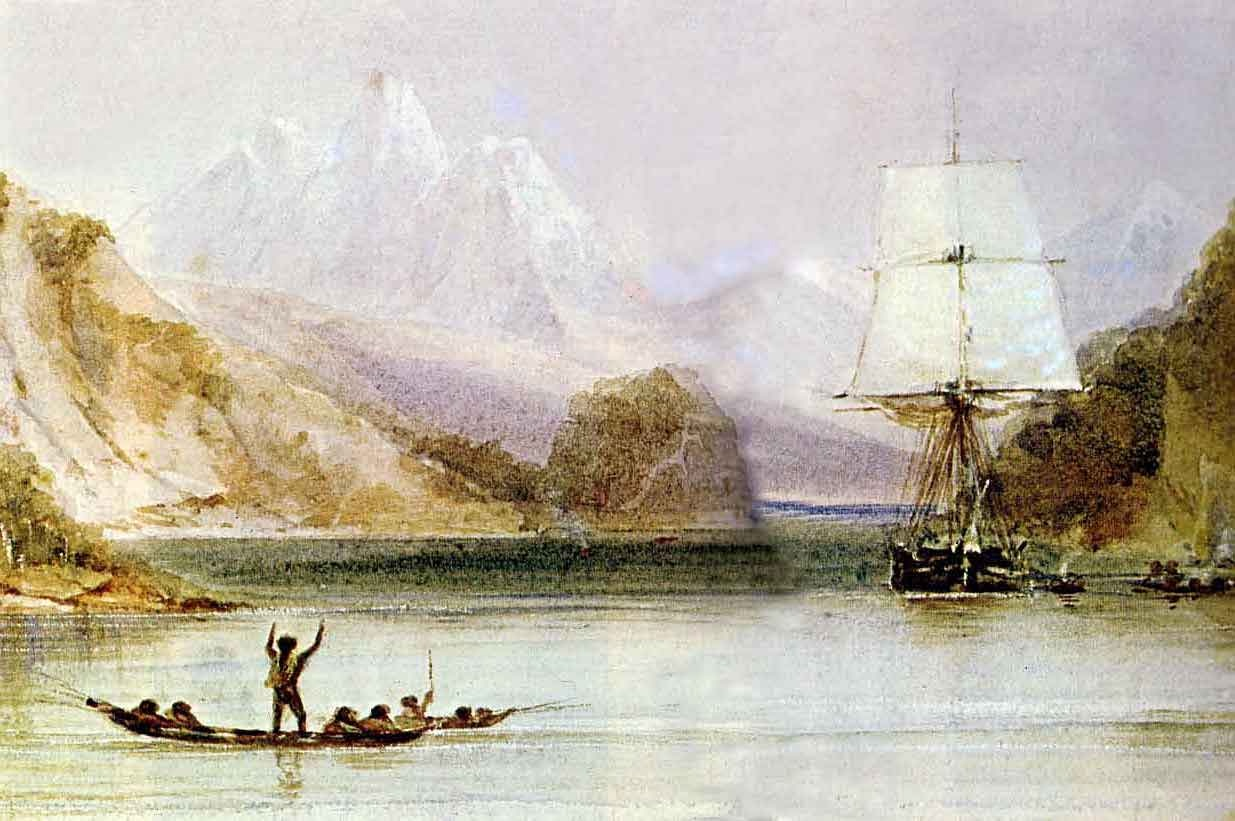
The voyage of the Beagle took place during Baker's tenure as commander in chief in South America

Baker was rewarded for his good services by being given command of his prize, now commissioned as HMS Didon, on 17 November. He transferred to HMS Tribune in May 1806, in which he served in the Bay of Biscay until 1808. A posting as flag captain to Rear-Admiral Thomas Bertie aboard the 74-gun HMS Vanguard came on 21 May 1808, and involved service in the Baltic. While on leave in Sweden he met and married Sofia Augusta Ruuth (1789-1871), daughter of Count Eric Ruuth, and the couple returned to England in 1811. Baker continued in active service through the rest of the Napoleonic Wars, commanding the 74-gun HMS Cumberland from 22 November 1811 until 2 August 1815. By the end of 1815 he could reflect that his active career had included playing a significant role in bringing about three of the decisive actions of the Napoleonic Wars, Copenhagen, Trafalgar, and Cape Ortegal.

Further rewards followed after the end of the war; he was appointed a Companion of the Bath on 4 June 1815, nominated a Colonel of the Royal Marines on 12 August 1819 and promoted to Knight Commander of the Bath on 8 June 1831. The Dutch nominated him a Knight of the Military Order of Wilhelm in 1816. Baker became a rear-admiral on 19 July 1821, and took up the position of commander-in-chief on the South America Station in 1829. During his period of command, the second voyage of HMS Beagle took place, carrying the naturalist Charles Darwin. The Beagle came under his orders as the senior officer of the station, and he was requested by the Admiralty to supply any of the needs of the surveying mission. Baker remained in command of the station until 1833. The Baker River (Chile) bears his name. He returned home, was promoted to vice-admiral on 10 January 1837, and died at Walmer on 26 January 1845, at the age of 74.

== Notes ==
Military offices
Preceded by Robert Otway	Commander-in-Chief, South America Station; 1829–1833	Succeeded by Michael Seymour
