= Atlantic campaign of 1806 order of battle =

Post-Trafalgar Napoleonic Wars battle

Duckworth's action off San Domingo, 6 February 1806 (Nicholas Pocock, 1808)

The Atlantic campaign of 1806 was one of the most important and complex naval campaigns of the post-Trafalgar Napoleonic Wars. Seeking to take advantage of the withdrawal of British forces from the Atlantic in the aftermath of the Battle of Trafalgar, Emperor Napoleon ordered two battle squadrons to sea from the fleet stationed at Brest, during December 1805. Escaping deep into the Atlantic, these squadrons succeeded in disrupting British convoys, evading pursuit by British battle squadrons and reinforcing the French garrison at Santo Domingo. The period of French success was brief: on 6 February 1806 one of the squadrons, under Vice-admiral Corentin Urbain de Leissègues, was intercepted by a British squadron at the Battle of San Domingo and destroyed, losing all five of its ships of the line.

The second French squadron, under Vice-admiral Jean-Baptiste Phillibert Willaumez, cruised in the South Atlantic and the Caribbean during the spring and summer of 1806, conducting several successful raids on British islands in the West Indies. His ability to affect British trade was hampered by the deployment of British squadrons against him and the disobedience of Captain Jérôme Bonaparte, the Emperor's brother. On 18 August an Atlantic hurricane dispersed his ships, causing severe damage and forcing them to take shelter in friendly or neutral harbours in the Americas. Waiting British ships destroyed one vessel, and several others were so badly damaged that they never sailed again, the four survivors limping back to France individually over the next two years. The various British squadrons deployed against him failed to catch Willaumez, but their presence had limited his ability to raid British trade routes.

The campaign included a number of subsidiary operations by both British and French ships, some taking advantage of the campaign to conduct smaller operations while the main enemy forces were distracted, others operating as diversions to the principal campaign to attack undefended areas or lure British ships away from the principal French squadrons. Among these operations was the return of the squadron under Counter-admiral Charles-Alexandre Léon Durand Linois from the Indian Ocean, which was captured at the action of 13 March 1806; the raiding cruises of L'Hermite's expedition and Lamellerie's expedition, which captured a number of merchant ships but each lost a frigate breaking through the blockade of the French coast; and the destruction of a convoy of seven French ships destined with supplies for the French West Indies at the action of 25 September 1806.

== French squadrons ==
=== Admiral Leissègues' squadron ===
Both of the principal French squadrons departed Brest on 13 December, remaining together for the first two days before dividing in pursuit of separate British merchant convoys on 15 December. The squadron under Leissègues clashed with the convoy's escort, before breaking off and sailing south for the French Caribbean, where Leissègues was intending to land the 1,000 soldiers carried aboard as reinforcements for the garrison at Santo Domingo, via the Azores. The voyage was long and difficult, Leissègues struggling through winter storms that divided his squadron and inflicted severe damage to his ships. Arriving at Santo Domingo on 20 January, Leissègues disembarked his troops and began extensive repairs to his ships in preparation for raiding cruises in the Caribbean.

On 6 February, Leissègues was surprised at anchor by a squadron under Vice-admiral Sir John Duckworth, which had been taking on fresh supplies at Basseterre when news of Leissègues' arrival reached him. Joined by ships from the West Indian squadron, Duckworth's force was larger than Leissègues' and also had the advantage of the wind that prevented the unprepared French squadron from escaping. Sailing westwards along the coast in a line of battle, Leissègues' flagship Impérial was the first to be attacked, eventually driving ashore along with the next in line, the Diomède, while three others surrendered at the Battle of San Domingo. Leissègues himself escaped ashore; the only surviving ships of his squadron were the frigates, all of which eventually returned to France later in the spring.

Admiral Leissègues' squadron
Ship	Guns	Commander	Notes
Impérial	120	Vice-admiral Corentin Urbain de Leissègues; Captain Julien-Gabriel Bigot	Driven ashore and destroyed at the Battle of San Domingo
Alexandre	80	Captain Pierre-Elie Garreau	Captured at the Battle of San Domingo
Brave	74	Commodore Louis-Marie Coudé	Captured at the Battle of San Domingo
Diomède	74	Captain Jean-Baptiste Henry	Driven ashore and destroyed at the Battle of San Domingo.
Jupiter	74	Captain Gaspard Laignel	Captured at the Battle of San Domingo
Comète	40		Returned to France in 1806
Félicité	40		Returned to France in 1806
Diligente	20	Captain Raymond Cocault	Returned to France in 1806
Source: James, Vol. 4, p. 184, Gardiner, The Victory of Seapower, p. 23

=== Admiral Willaumez's squadron ===
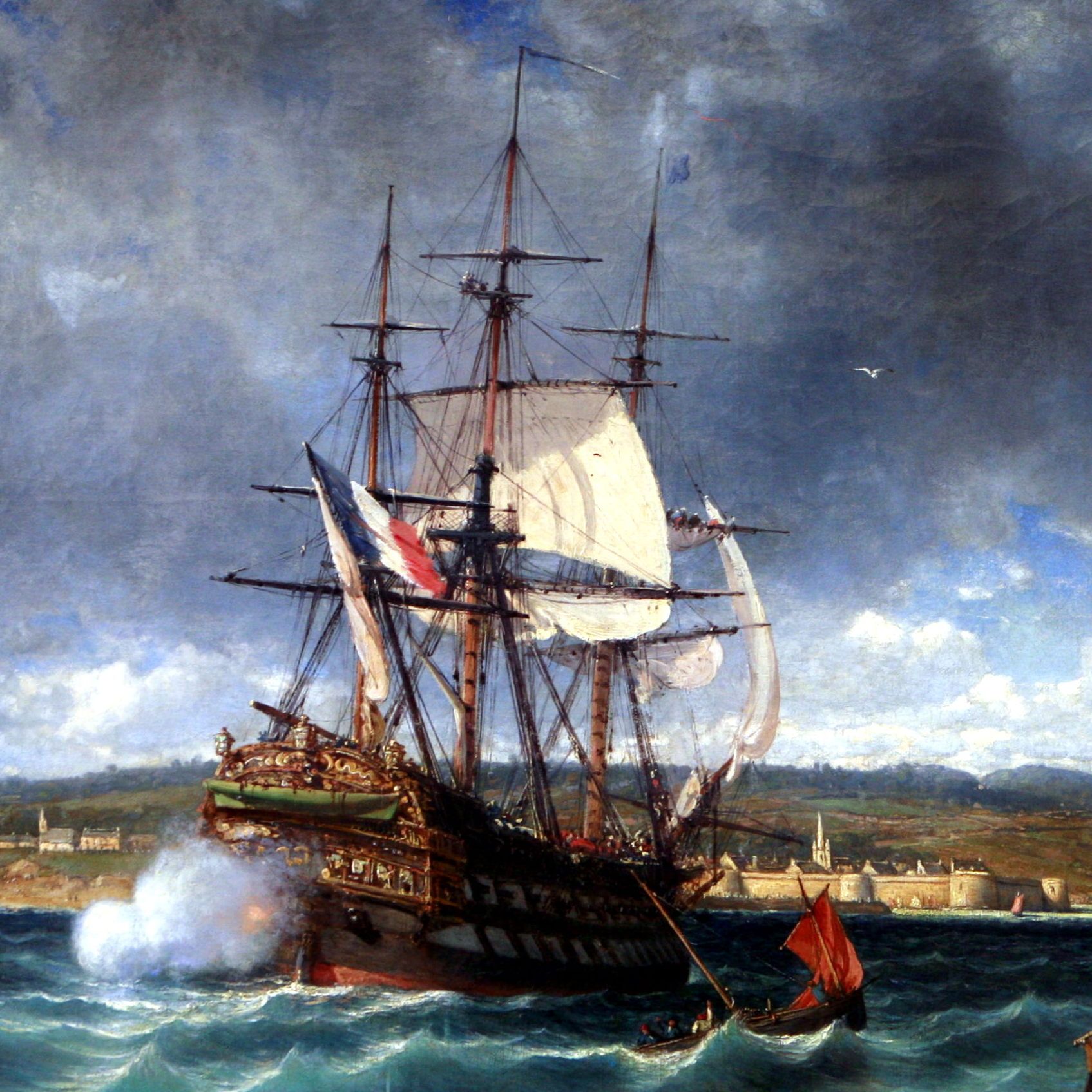
1861 painting of Vétéran reaching Concarneau by Michel Bouquet

After separating from Leissègues on 15 December, Willaumez sailed south, capturing a number of vessels from a British troop convoy and sending the prizes, with the frigate Volontaire, to Tenerife. Willaumez's intention was to raid the China Fleet, a large convoy of valuable East Indiamen that sailed from the Far East to Britain every year. However, on 23 December he was pursued by Duckworth and driven far off course, so that by the time he reached the Cape of Good Hope, where he planned to resupply his ships, it had already been captured by a British expeditionary force. Turning westwards, Willaumez raided shipping in the South Atlantic until April, when he anchored at Salvador in neutral Brazil. By early May, Willaumez was at sea again, stopping at Cayenne and then splitting his force to raid shipping in the Leeward Islands prior to reuniting at Fort-de-France on Martinique in June.

On 1 July, Willaumez sailed again, attacking shipping at Montserrat, Nevis and St. Kitts before sailing to Tortola in preparation for an attack on the Jamaica convoy. Before he could reach the convoy, Willaumez was intercepted off the Passage Islands by a squadron under Rear-admiral Sir Alexander Cochrane and driven northwards into the Bahamas. There he waited for the Jamaica convoy to pass, seizing any ship of any nationality that came within sight, in case they should reveal his position. After several weeks of waiting, Captain Bonaparte, the Emperor's brother and commander of the ship Vétéran, decided that he would no longer submit to Willaumez's command and sailed north during the night of 31 July, without orders or even notifying the admiral.

Vétéran eventually returned to France on 26 August, after destroying six ships from a Quebec convoy. Panicked by the unexplained disappearance of one of his ships and its illustrious captain, Willaumez struck north in search of the vessel and as a result missed the passage of the Jamaica convoy, also narrowly avoiding an encounter with the squadrons under Warren and Strachan. On 18 August a hurricane dispersed his ships, severely damaging them and scattering them along the Atlantic Seaboard of the Americas. One was destroyed by a British patrol, two others were too badly damaged to be repaired and were broken up, and three of his ships successfully made the journey back to France over the next two years.

Admiral Willaumez's squadron
Ship	Guns	Commander	Notes
Foudroyant	80	Vice-admiral Jean-Baptiste Phillibert Willaumez; Captain Antoine Henri	Badly damaged in an August hurricane, sheltered in Havana. Returned to France in early 1807.
Cassard	74	Commodore Gilbert-Amable Faure	Separated in August hurricane, returned to Brest on 13 October.
Impétueux	74	Commodore Alain-Joseph Le Veyer-Belair	Badly damaged in an August hurricane, driven ashore and destroyed by British ships on 14 September 1806.
Patriote	74	Commodore Joseph-Hyacinthe-Isidore Khrom	Badly damaged in an August hurricane, sheltered in Annapolis. Returned to France in January 1808.
Éole	74	Captain Louis-Gilles Prévost de Lacroix	Badly damaged in an August hurricane, sheltered in Annapolis. Eventually broken up as beyond repair.
Vétéran	74	Captain Jérôme Bonaparte	Separated without orders on 31 July, returning to France alone on 26 August.
Valeureuse	40		Badly damaged in an August hurricane, sheltered in Philadelphia. Eventually broken up as beyond repair.
Volontaire	40	Captain Bretel	Detached in December 1805 to Tenerife. Captured on 4 March 1806 at Cape Town.
Also two corvettes, names unknown
Source: James, Vol. 4, p. 185

=== Admiral Linois's squadron ===
One of the minor French squadrons that participated in the campaign was the force under Linois, who had sailed for the Indian Ocean with a ship of the line and four frigates in March 1803 during the Peace of Amiens. After brief stops at Puducherry and Île de France, Linois sailed on a raiding cruise to the South China Sea only to be driven off by a British merchant convoy at the Battle of Pulo Aura. Despite subsequent minor success against merchant ships, including the Battle of Vizagapatam, Linois's failure to inflict significant damage to British trade in the Far East enraged Napoleon, and in late 1805, with supplies running low and his ships in need of repair, Linois began the return journey to Europe with just his flagship and a single frigate remaining.

By the early morning of 13 March 1806 he was in the Mid-Atlantic when his lookouts spotted sails in the distance. Turning his force around to investigate, Linois hoped to encounter a merchant convoy but instead discovered the large British second-rate HMS London looming out of the darkness ahead. Unable to escape, Linois fought until his ships were battered and he himself was badly wounded, but he eventually surrendered to Warren's remaining ships, which had followed London. Napoleon's fury at Linois was unabated and the French admiral remained a prisoner of war for the next eight years.

Admiral Linois's squadron
Ship	Guns	Commander	Notes
Marengo	74	Counter-admiral Charles-Alexandre Léon Durand Linois; Captain Joseph-Marie Vrignaud	Captured at the action of 13 March 1806.
Belle Poule	40	Captain Alain-Adélaïde-Marie Bruilhac	Captured at the action of 13 March 1806.
Source: James, Vol. 3, p. 176, Clowes, p. 58

=== Commodore L'Hermite's squadron ===
One of the principal French diversionary operations during 1806 was by a force that had been sent to sea in October 1805 as a diversion during the Trafalgar campaign, which by then was almost over. Sailing from Lorient to West Africa, L'Hermite was supposed to have been reinforced by a squadron under Jérôme Bonaparte and attack and capture British forts on the West African coast, thus forcing the detachment of British forces from the main campaign in pursuit. The events of the end of the Trafalgar campaign cancelled these plans, and the scheduled reinforcements were instead attached to Willaumez's squadron. Despite this setback, L'Hermite continued with elements of the original plan and attacked British merchant ships and slave ships off West Africa during the spring of 1806, inflicting some local damage but failing to capture a trading post or to affect the wider strategic situation. In June, L'Hermite sailed to Cayenne for supplies and then returned to Europe the following month, encountering part of the British blockade squadron under Rear-admiral Thomas Louis on his return and losing the frigate Président.

Commodore L'Hermite's squadron
Ship	Guns	Commander	Notes
Régulus	74	Commodore Jean-Marthe-Adrien L'Hermite	Returned to Brest on 5 October
Président	40	Captain Labrosse	Captured by a British squadron in the Bay of Biscay on 27 September 1806
Cybèle	40		Damaged in a hurricane on 20 August, forced to shelter in Hampton Roads. Returned to Rochefort in 1807.
Surveillant	corvette		Returned to France in January 1806
Favourite	18		Captured off West Africa on 6 January and attached to squadron. Remained in the Caribbean and was captured by HMS Jason on 27 January 1807.
Source: James, Vol. 4, p. 264

=== Commodore La Meillerie's squadron ===
One of the French squadrons that operated in the Atlantic campaign of 1806 was the result of opportunity rather than strategy. After the Battle of Trafalgar, most of the French survivors had retreated to Cádiz, where they remained until Duckworth's blockade squadron abandoned the port in November 1805. Although Duckworth's ships were replaced by forces under Vice-admiral Lord Collingwood, the replacements were inadequate and on 26 February 1806, while the blockade squadron, which had been pulled back in the hope of luring the French out of the port, had been blown off station, four frigates and a brig escaped. Chased by the British frigate HMS Hydra, Commodore Louis La-Marre-la-Meillerie refused battle and abandoned the brig Furet to the British in his haste to escape.

Sailing to Senegal and then Cayenne, La Meillerie's operations had little effect and by 18 May he was already on the return journey to France, hoping to anchor in the Biscay port of Rochefort. On 27 July, the frigates were spotted by HMS Mars, a ship of the line of the British blockade squadron, and chased with the frigate Rhin rapidly falling behind. Declining to support the straggler, La Meillerie ran on towards France while Mars took possession of Rhin, and the surviving ships found safe ports along the Biscay coast.

Commodore La Meillerie's squadron
Ship	Guns	Commander	Notes
Hortense	40	Commodore Louis La-Marre-la-Meillerie	Returned to Bordeaux on 28 July
Rhin	40	Captain Michel-Jean-André Chesneau	Captured on 28 July by HMS Mars
Hermione	40	Captain Jean-Michel Mahé	Returned to Bordeaux on 28 July
Thémis	36	Commodore Nicolas Jugan	Returned to Rochefort on 28 July
Furet	18	Lieutenant Pierre-Antoine-Toussaint Demai	Captured on 28 February by HMS Hydra
Source: James, Vol. 4, p. 253, Clowes, p. 387

=== Commodore Soleil's squadron ===
The final French operation in the Atlantic during the campaign was an attempt to send seven frigates and corvettes to the French West Indies in September, laden with supplies to help maintain the strength and morale of the garrisons. With Willaumez believed to be still at sea, September 1806 seemed a good time to send a squadron into the Atlantic, but in fact the force was spotted within hours of leaving Rochefort by the British blockade force under Commodore Sir Samuel Hood. Hood's force gave chase and the large ships of the line soon caught up the frigates in heavy weather. Sending four of his ships off in different directions, Soleil attempted to give them cover with his three largest vessels, but after a hard-fought battle in which Hood lost an arm, four of the French frigates were captured.

Commodore Soleil's Squadron
Ship	Guns	Commander	Notes
Gloire	40	Commodore Eleonore-Jean-Nicolas Soleil	Captured at Action of 25 September 1806
Minerve	40	Captain Joseph Collet	Captured at Action of 25 September 1806
Armide	40	Captain Jean-Jacques-Jude Langlois	Captured at Action of 25 September 1806
Infatigable	40	Captain Joseph-Maurice Girardias	Captured at Action of 25 September 1806
Thétis	36	Captain Jacques Pinsum	
Lynx	16		
Sylphe	16		
Source: James, Vol. 4, p. 262, Clowes, p. 390, Woodman, p. 226, "No. 15962". The London Gazette. 30 September 1806. p. 1306.

== British squadrons ==
=== Admiral Warren's squadron ===
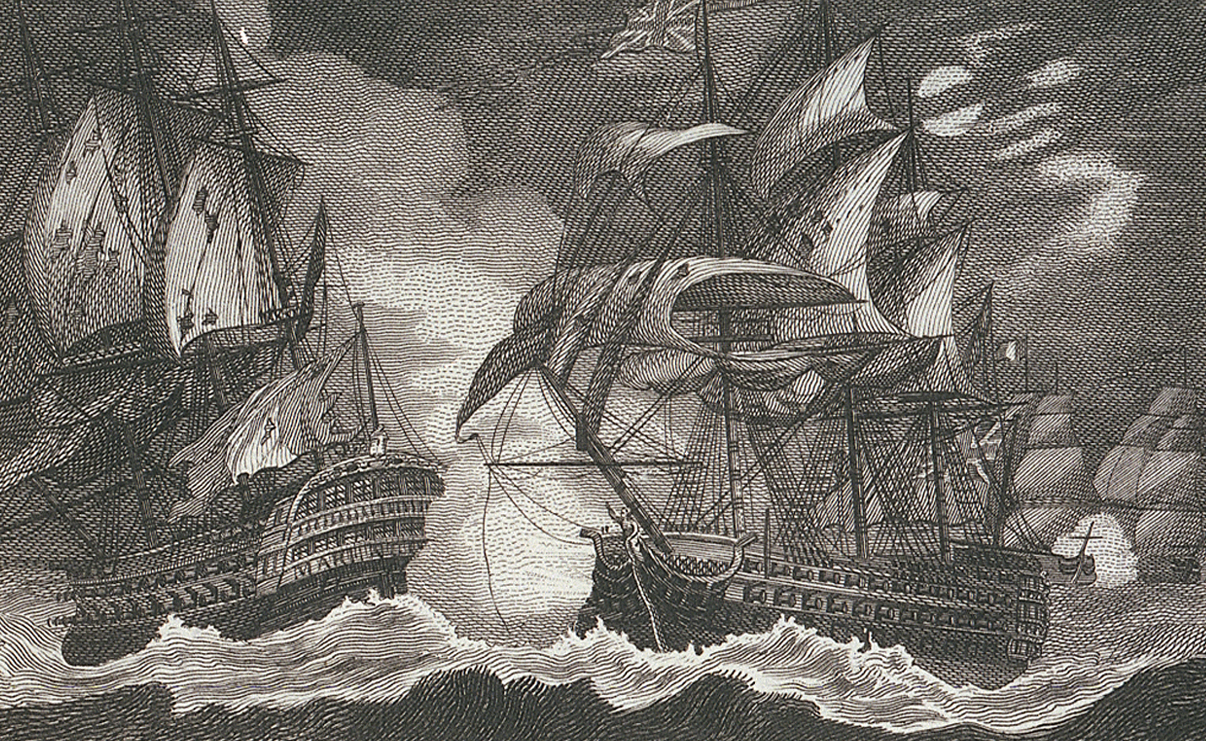
The London Man of War capturing the Marengo Admiral Linois, 13 March 1806, contemporary engraving by "C. I. W."

Warren's squadron mustered at Spithead in December 1805 included one second-rate, one 80-gun ship of the line and five 74-gun ships of line, but no frigates or smaller vessels to operate as scouts. Prevented from sailing during December by high winds, Warren remained off St Helens on the Isle of Wight until the middle of January, when the winds lifted and he set a course for Madeira. There he was to search for information of the French squadrons and, if no information was forthcoming, to sail for Barbados and augment the squadrons in the Caribbean. For the next two months, Warren remained in the central eastern Atlantic Ocean, aware that Willaumez was cruising to the south and that Leissègues had been destroyed off San Domingo. During February his force was joined by the independently sailing frigate HMS Amazon.

On 13 March 1806, Warren's squadron sighted and pursued two sails to the northeast, which were eventually recognised as the squadron under Admiral Linois, returning to France from an extended cruise in the Indian Ocean. In the ensuing Action of 13 March 1806, London and Amazon were able to defeat and capture the French ships Marengo and Belle Poule, the resulting damage and prizes prompting Warren to return to Britain. During the return journey his squadron was struck by a spring storm and several ships suffered damage and were separated, eventually rejoining Warren's main force and returning to Spithead. In Britain, Warren's ships underwent repairs and London and Repulse were detached, replaced by HMS Fame under Captain Richard Bennet. In late June Warren's squadron sailed again, under orders to intercept Willaumez off the Bahamas. Arriving in the Caribbean on 12 July, Warren narrowly missed intercepting Willaumez's squadron, which had sailed to the north in search of Vétéran.

Admiral Warren's first squadron
Ship	Guns	Commander	Notes
HMS London	98	Captain Sir Harry Burrard Neale	Engaged at the action of 13 March 1806
HMS Foudroyant	80	Rear-admiral Sir John Borlase Warren; Captain John Chambers White	
HMS Ramillies	74	Captain Francis Pickmore	Badly damaged in the storm of 23 April 1806
HMS Hero	74	Captain Alan Gardner	
HMS Namur	74	Captain Lawrence Halsted	
HMS Repulse	74	Captain Arthur Kaye Legge	
HMS Courageux	74	Captain James Bissett	
HMS Amazon	38	Captain William Parker	Joined the squadron during February. Engaged at the action of 13 March 1806.
Source: James, Vol. 4, p. 185

Admiral Warren's second squadron
Ship	Guns	Commander	Notes
HMS Foudroyant	80	Rear-admiral Sir John Borlase Warren; Captain John Chambers White	
HMS Ramillies	74	Captain Francis Pickmore	
HMS Hero	74	Captain Alan Gardner	
HMS Namur	74	Captain Lawrence Halsted	
HMS Fame	74	Captain Richard Bennet	
HMS Courageux	74	Captain James Bissett	
HMS Amazon	38	Captain William Parker	
Source: James, Vol. 4, p. 185

=== Admiral Strachan's squadron ===
Strachan's squadron was ordered to prepare for sea during December at Plymouth, but like Warren's force, Strachan was trapped by strong winds in Cawsand Bay and could not sail until mid-January. Strachan's orders were to sail for Saint Helena and search for signs of the French squadrons. If their whereabouts could not be discovered, Strachan was to join the squadron under Admiral Sir Home Riggs Popham detailed to invade the Dutch colony at the Cape of Good Hope. During February and March Strachan searched in vain, eventually receiving the news that Willaumez had anchored in neutral Salvador in Brazil during April. Steering northwest in the hope of intercepting the French squadron, Strachan was hampered by the presence of HMS St George, which proved too slow for a flying squadron. Returning to Plymouth, Strachan detached St George and Centaur, which had been made the flagship of the Rochefort blockade squadron and was given HMS Belleisle, HMS Audacious and HMS Montagu as replacements, as well as two frigates.

Departing Plymouth on 19 May, Strachan sailed for the Caribbean, passing Madeira and the Canary Islands before anchoring at Carlisle Bay, Barbados on 8 August. Five days later Strachan sail northwards in pursuit of Willaumez and on 18 August was caught in the same hurricane that dispersed Willaumez's squadron slightly to the north. During August and September, Strachan's scattered ships gathered off the rendezvous point at Chesapeake Bay in the hope of intercepting any French vessels seeking shelter in American ports. On 14 September, Belleisle, Bellona and Melampus sighted the limping French ship Impétueux off Cape Henry and drove her ashore, burning the wreck in violation of American neutrality.

Admiral Strachan's first squadron
Ship	Guns	Commander	Notes
HMS St George	98	Captain Thomas Bertie	Detached in May at Plymouth
HMS Caesar	80	Rear-admiral Sir Richard Strachan; Captain Charles Richardson	
HMS Centaur	74	Captain Sir Samuel Hood	Detached in May at Plymouth
HMS Terrible	74	Captain Lord Henry Paulet	
HMS Triumph	74	Captain Henry Inman	
HMS Bellona	74	Captain John Erskine Douglas	
Source: James, Vol. 4, p. 207

Admiral Strachan's second squadron
Ship	Guns	Commander	Notes
HMS Caesar	80	Rear-admiral Sir Richard Strachan; Captain Charles Richardson	
HMS Belleisle	74	Captain William Hargood	Participated in the destruction of Impétueux on 14 September
HMS Terrible	74	Captain Lord Henry Paulet	
HMS Triumph	74	Captain Sir Thomas Hardy	
HMS Bellona	74	Captain John Erskine Douglas	Participated in the destruction of Impétueux on 14 September
HMS Audacious	74	Captain Thomas Gosselyn	
HMS Montagu	74	Captain Robert Otway	
HMS Melampus	36	Captain Stephen Poyntz	Participated in the destruction of Impétueux on 14 September
HMS Decade	36	Captain John Stuart	
Source: James, Vol. 4, p. 210, Clowes, p. 196

=== Admiral Duckworth's squadron ===
The third principal British squadron deployed during the campaign was never intended to take part in it. Duckworth had been ordered to lead the blockade of Cádiz in November 1805, following the destruction of the French and Spanish fleets at the Battle of Trafalgar on 21 October. Finding the blockade of the survivors at Cádiz dull, Duckworth sailed south in search of Allemand's expedition, leaving just two frigates to watch the Spanish port. Allemand escaped Duckworth, but on 23 December he was informed of the depredations by Willaumez's squadron and sailed to intercept him. On 25 December he discovered Willaumez but was unable to catch him eventually abandoning the chase and retiring to St. Kitts in the West Indies to take on fresh supplies. There he was joined by several ships of the Leeward Islands squadron under Cochrane and also learned of the arrival of Leissègues at Santo Domingo. Sailing to intercept the French squadron, Duckworth successfully encountered them on 6 February 1806 and in the ensuing Battle of San Domingo, captured or destroyed all five of the ships of the line, carrying his prizes to Jamaica. Duckworth then returned to Britain, leaving Cochrane with a number of vessels to patrol the Eastern Caribbean in anticipation of the arrival of Willaumez.

Admiral Duckworth's squadron
Ship	Guns	Commander	Notes
HMS Canopus	80	Rear-admiral Thomas Louis; Captain Francis Austen	Engaged at the Battle of San Domingo
HMS Superb	74	Vice-admiral Sir John Thomas Duckworth; Captain Richard Goodwin Keats	Engaged at the Battle of San Domingo
HMS Spencer	74	Captain Robert Stopford	Engaged at the Battle of San Domingo
HMS Donegal	74	Captain Pulteney Malcolm	Engaged at the Battle of San Domingo
HMS Powerful	74	Captain Robert Plampin	Detached to the Indian Ocean on 2 February 1806
HMS Agamemnon	64	Captain Sir Edward Berry	Engaged at the Battle of San Domingo
HMS Acasta	40	Captain Richard Dalling Dunn	
HMS Amethyst	36	Captain James William Spranger	Detached to Britain on 26 December 1805
Admiral Cochrane's reinforcements
HMS Northumberland	74	Rear-Admiral Alexander Cochrane; Captain John Morrison	Joined at Basseterre on 21 January 1806. Engaged at the Battle of San Domingo.
HMS Atlas	74	Captain Samuel Pym	Joined at Basseterre on 21 January 1806. Engaged at the Battle of San Domingo.
HMS Magicienne	32	Captain Adam Mackenzie	Joined off Santo Domingo on 5 February 1806
HMS Kingfisher	16	Commander Nathaniel Day Cochrane	Joined at Basseterre on 1 February 1806
HMS Epervier	14	Lieutenant James Higginson	Joined off Saint Thomas on 3 February 1806
Source: James, Vol. 4, p. 187

=== Admiral Cochrane's squadron ===
Following the Battle of San Domingo, Cochrane gathered a small squadron in anticipation of the arrival of the second French force under Willaumez. Based at Carlisle Bay, Barbados, Cochrane's forces patrolled the Leeward Islands for the French force during the spring, eventually locating Willaumez's ships at Fort-de-France on Martinique on 14 June 1806. An attempt to blockade the port ended in failure as several ships were damaged in high winds, but when Willaumez sailed on 1 July, Cochrane had planned ahead, and brought his squadron to Tortola, blocking the passage through which Willaumez would have to sail to attack the valuable Jamaica convoy, then gathering off Saint Thomas. With his squadron, Cochrane successfully drove off Willaumez on 4 July without a fight, and the French admiral retired to the Bahama Banks to await the convoy's passage northwards. Cochrane spent the next month preparing the convoy for its voyage, which it began during August while Willaumez was out of position to the north.

Admiral Cochrane's squadron
Ship	Guns	Commander	Notes
HMS Northumberland	74	Rear-admiral Sir Alexander Cochrane; Captain John Spear	
HMS Elephant	74	Captain George Dundas	
HMS Canada	74	Captain John Harvey	
HMS Agamemnon	64	Captain Jonas Rose	
HMS Ethalion	36	Captain Charles Stuart	
HMS Seine	36	Captain David Atkins	
HMS Galatea	32	Captain Murray Maxwell	
HMS Circe	32	Captain Hugh Pigott	
Source: James, Vol. 4, p. 204

=== Rochefort blockade squadrons ===
Although other British forces were deployed during the year, most were engaged on other operations incidental to the main Atlantic campaign, such as the expeditionary force to the Cape of Good Hope under Commodore Home Riggs Popham. In addition, a number of blockade squadrons were deployed to the major ports of the French Atlantic coast. These forces contained the French warships still at anchor in the ports and restricted the return of French warships from service at sea during the campaign. These forces included a Channel squadron under Rear-admiral Thomas Louis, whose ships intercepted and captured a frigate of Commodore Jean-Marthe-Adrien L'Hermite's squadron on 27 September, and blockade forces off Cádiz under the distant command of Vice-admiral Lord Collingwood and Brest under Admiral William Cornwallis. Cornwallis in particular was particularly effective: under his watch, only one French ship of the line successfully entered or departed Brest harbour during the year.

There was one blockade force that played a particular role in the campaign, the force deployed to the waters off Rochefort, initially under the command of Commodore Richard Goodwin Keats. Under Keats, the French squadron under Louis La-Marre-la-Meillerie was intercepted on 17 July, HMS Mars capturing a frigate and chasing the others into port. In August, Keats was replaced by Commodore Sir Samuel Hood, who was to achieve one of the more notable victories of the year at the action of 25 September 1806, when a French convoy of seven ships sailing to the West Indies was intercepted and defeated. Although Hood's force captured four large modern frigates, the French fought hard and Hood himself was seriously wounded by musket fire, losing an arm.

Commodore Keats' squadron
Ship	Guns	Commander	Notes
HMS Superb	74	Commodore Richard Goodwin Keats	
HMS Mars	74	Captain Robert Dudley Oliver	Captured frigate Rhin on 17 July
HMS Africa	64	Captain Henry Digby	
Keats' squadron also included two other ships of the line.
Source: James, Vol. 4, p. 253

Commodore Hood's squadron
Ship	Guns	Commander	Notes
HMS Monarch	74	Captain Richard Lee	Engaged at the action of 25 September 1806
HMS Centaur	74	Commodore Sir Samuel Hood	Engaged at the action of 25 September 1806
HMS Mars	74	Captain William Lukin	Engaged at the action of 25 September 1806
HMS Windsor Castle	98	Captain Charles Boyles	
HMS Achille	74	Captain Richard King	
HMS Revenge	74	Captain Sir John Gore	
HMS Atalante	16	Commander John Ore Masefield	
Source: James, Vol. 4, p. 262
