= Battle of San Domingo order of battle =

Duckworth's Action off San Domingo, 6 February 1806 (Nicholas Pocock, 1808)

The Battle of San Domingo was the last fleet engagement of the Napoleonic Wars, contested off the Southern coast of the Spanish colonial Captaincy General of Santo Domingo, then under French occupation, on 6 February 1806. A British squadron of seven ships of the line under Vice-Admiral Sir John Thomas Duckworth surprised and destroyed a French squadron of five ships of the line led by Counter-admiral Corentin Urbain de Leissègues as the French sailed westwards along the San Domingo coast. Using his superior numbers and speed, Duckworth struck at the head of the French line with his leading ships while the slower eastern division of his squadron intercepted and captured the French stragglers. The only French ships to escape were two frigates and a corvette – three ships of the line were captured and two destroyed, including Leissègues' flagship, the 120-gun Impérial. French casualties were estimated as more than 1,500 men killed and wounded and the British suffered nearly 350 casualties in the engagement, which lasted for just over two hours.

Leissègues' squadron had escaped from Brest on 13 December 1805, taking advantage of a lapse in the British blockade. Sailing with another squadron under Counter-admiral Jean-Baptiste Willaumez, Leissègues separated from Willaumez after two days and passed north of the Azores, where his ships were damaged and scattered by winter storms. Sailing for Santo Domingo to reconstitute his squadron and make urgent repairs, Leissègues arrived on 20 January 1806. Duckworth had been tasked with watching the remnants of the French and Spanish fleets in Cádiz following the Battle of Trafalgar in October 1805, but in November had gone hunting to the south in search of a French raiding squadron and on his route back to his station had encountered a frigate that reported the escape of Leissègues and Willaumez. Sailing in pursuit, Duckworth encountered Willaumez on 25 December but refused battle and instead sailed for the West Indies to replenish his supplies before making the journey back to European waters. News reached him of the French arrival while anchored at Basseterre on 1 February and he immediately sailed to investigate, joined by part of the West Indies squadron under Rear-Admiral Alexander Cochrane.

== British squadron ==
Duckworth's squadron was principally formed from his original Cádiz squadron, except for HMS Powerful which had been sent to the Indian Ocean in December 1805, and with the addition of two ships from the West Indies squadron under Cochrane, HMS Northumberland and HMS Atlas. Frigates and smaller craft joined the fleet as it sailed north through the Leeward Islands, but none were engaged during the battle itself except to act as tows for the more seriously damaged ships of the line. As he approached the French line, Duckworth separated his force into two divisions: a western force to windward under Duckworth himself and a slower eastern force led by Duckworth's second in command Rear-Admiral Thomas Louis. During the engagement the divisions became separated and as a result Duckworth's division fought the strongest French forces at the head of the line. Louis was initially engaged with the French rear, but later assisted his commander against the huge Impérial during the final stages of the battle. British casualties were recorded in detail in Duckworth's despatches, based on the returns of each ship, although they were not evenly distributed: HMS Agamemnon arrived late in the battle and suffered minimal losses, while Northumberland was heavily engaged with the French flagship and suffered correspondingly severe casualties.

Vice-Admiral Duckworth's squadron
Duckworth's division
Ship	Rate	Guns	Commander	Casualties			Notes
Ship	Rate	Guns	Commander	Killed	Wounded	Total	Notes
HMS Superb	Third rate	74	Vice-Admiral Sir John Thomas Duckworth; Captain Richard Goodwin Keats	6	56	62	Lightly damaged
HMS Northumberland	Third rate	74	Rear-Admiral Alexander Cochrane; Captain John Morrison	21	79	100	Mainmast collapsed and hull, rigging and remaining masts badly damaged
HMS Spencer	Third rate	74	Captain Robert Stopford	18	50	68	Severe damage to hull, but masts and rigging largely intact
HMS Agamemnon	Third rate	64	Captain Sir Edward Berry	1	13	14	
Louis' division
HMS Canopus	Third rate	80	Rear-Admiral Thomas Louis; Captain Francis Austen	8	22	30	Lightly damaged
HMS Donegal	Third rate	74	Captain Pulteney Malcolm	12	33	45	Foreyard shot away, otherwise lightly damaged
HMS Atlas	Third rate	74	Captain Samuel Pym	8	11	19	Bowsprit lost in collision with Canopus and tiller damaged by shot. Otherwise lightly damaged
Minor warships
HMS Acasta	Fifth rate	40	Captain Richard Dalling Dunn	0	0	0	Not engaged in the battle
HMS Magicienne	Fifth rate	32	Captain Adam Mackenzie	0	0	0	Not engaged in the battle
HMS Kingfisher	Brig	16	Commander Nathaniel Day Cochrane	0	0	0	Not engaged, sent to Britain with despatches after the battle
HMS Epervier	Brig	14	Lieutenant James Higginson	0	0	0	Not engaged in the battle
Total casualties: 74 killed, 264 wounded, 338 total
Source: James, pp. 196–197, "No. 15902". The London Gazette. 24 March 1806. pp. 371–374.

== French squadron ==
Leissègues' squadron was unchanged from the force that left Brest on 13 December. All ships however, especially Jupiter and Diomède, had been badly damaged by storms off the Azores in late December and repairs were incomplete by the time of Duckworth's attack, most of the fleet still undergoing caulking at Santo Domingo. Recognising that if he was caught at anchor he would be destroyed, Leissègues sent orders from his offices in Santo Domingo for the fleet to sail, joining them later by small boat. Trapped against the land with the wind from the west, Leissègues had no option but to form a line of battle and wait to meet the British squadron. Although his ships fought hard, they were unable to mutually support one another and were rapidly overwhelmed: three surrendered, while Diomède and Impérial were driven ashore and wrecked to prevent their capture. The only ships to escape were the two frigates and a corvette that and slipped between the French line and the land early in the battle and made sail to the west, eventually reaching France.

French casualties are hard to calculate, as the best available source is the vague totals submitted by Duckworth in his account to the Admiralty. He estimates, apparently based on reports by the senior remaining French officers on Alexandre, Jupiter and Brave, that those three ships suffered 760 casualties in total. These accounts were subsequently called into question by historian William James, who considered them too high. James also criticised the assumed totals for Impérial and Diomède, which are even less certain but reportedly totalled 500 and 250 respectively. In addition to those killed and wounded, the entire surviving crews of Alexandre, Jupiter and Brave were taken prisoner, as were 150 men from Diomède and six from Impérial seized by British boarding parties on 8 February.

Counter-admiral Leissègues' squadron
Ship	Rate	Guns	Commander	Casualties	Notes
Alexandre	Third rate	80	Captain Pierre-Elie Garreau	~300	Captured in a dismasted and sinking state with surviving crew. Repaired, but unfit for continued service and later broken up
Impérial	First rate	120	Counter-admiral Corentin Urbain de Leissègues; Captain Julien-Gabriel Bigot	~500	Driven ashore and wrecked, subsequently burnt by a British boarding party on 8 February. Six men taken prisoner
Diomède	Third rate	74	Captain Jean-Baptiste Henry	~250	Driven ashore and wrecked, subsequently burnt by a British boarding party on 8 February. 150 men taken prisoner
Jupiter	Third rate	74	Captain Gaspard Laignel	~200	Captured with surviving crew. Later commissioned into the Royal Navy as HMS Maida
Brave	Third rate	74	Commodore Louis-Marie Coudé	~260	Captured with surviving crew. Foundered during journey back to Europe
Minor warships
Comète	Fifth rate	40		0	Not engaged in the battle, returned to France
Félicité	Fifth rate	32		0	Not engaged in the battle, returned to France
Diligente	Corvette	20	Captain Raymond Cocault	0	Not engaged in the battle, returned to France
Total casualties: 1,510
Source: James, pp. 196–197, "No. 15902". The London Gazette. 24 March 1806. pp. 371–374.

== Bibliography ==
- Adkins, Roy & Lesley (2006). The War for All the Oceans. Abacus. ISBN 0-349-11916-3.
- Clowes, William Laird (1997) [1900]. The Royal Navy, A History from the Earliest Times to 1900, Volume V. Chatham Publishing. ISBN 1-86176-014-0.
- Gardiner, Robert, ed. (2001) [1998]. The Victory of Seapower. Caxton Editions. ISBN 1-84067-359-1.
- Hannah, P. (2021). Keats, A Treasure to the Service. Green Hill. ISBN 978-1-922629-73-9.
- James, William (2002) [1827]. The Naval History of Great Britain, Volume 4, 1805–1807. Conway Maritime Press. ISBN 0-85177-908-5.
- Woodman, Richard (2001). The Sea Warriors. Constable Publishers. ISBN 1-84119-183-3.
