= French ship Vengeur (1803) =

Ship of the line of the French Navy

- Impérial (centre) at the Battle of San Domingo

History

France
- Name: Peuple
- Namesake: People
- Renamed: Vengeur
- Namesake: Vengeur du Peuple
- Launched: 1 October 1803
- Completed: February 1804
- Renamed: Impérial March 1805
- Fate: Wrecked 6 February 1806; Burned 8 February 1806

General characteristics
- Class & type: Océan class ship of the line
- Displacement: 5,095 tonneaux
- Tons burthen: 2,794–2,930 port tonneaux
- Length: 65.18 m (213.8 ft) (196,6 French feet)
- Beam: 16.24 m (53.3 ft) (50 French feet)
- Draught: 8.12 m (26.6 ft) (25 French feet)
- Propulsion: sail, 3 265 m²
- Complement: 1 079 men
- Armament: Rated as 120-gun: lower deck: 32 36-pounder guns; middle deck: 34 24-pounder guns; upper deck: 34 18-pounder guns; forecastle: 18 8-pounder guns, 6 36-pounder carronades

Vengeur was a 118-gun Océan-class ship of the line of the French Navy launched in 1803. She was the first ship in French service to sport 18-pounder long guns on her third deck, instead of the lighter 12-pounder long guns used before for this role. Renamed Impérial in 1805, she was destroyed at the Battle of San Domingo in 1806.

== Career ==
Laid down as Peuple in covered basin no.3 at Brest Dockyard in October 1793, she was renamed as Vengeur after the Bataille du 13 prairial an 2 in honour of the Vengeur du Peuple by a decree passed by the National Convention. She was launched on 1 October 1803 and completed in February 1804. She was again renamed in March 1805, becoming Impérial.

During the War of the Third Coalition, Impérial was the flagship of a squadron under the overall command of Vice-Admiral Corentin-Urbain Leissègues which was part of a larger French force that sailed from Brest, France, on 13 December 1805 for what was planned as a 14-month cruise to attack British merchant shipping while avoiding combat with major Royal Navy forces. On 15 December 1805, the French force split into two squadrons which proceeded independently from one another. Aboard Impérial, Leissègues led his squadron across the Atlantic Ocean bound for the Caribbean. After encountering a storm off the Azores in late December 1805, Impérial and most of the squadron arrived at French-held Santo Domingo on Hispaniola on 20 January 1806, where Leissègues ordered the ships to be recaulked after their long and difficult transatlantic voyage.

On the morning of 6 February 1806, a Royal Navy squadron under the command of Vice-Admiral Sir John Thomas Duckworth arrived off Santo Domingo to attack Leissègues′s force. Leissègues was conducting business ashore when the British squadron was sighted, and the French force was delayed in getting underway while it awaited his return to Impérial. Several of Leissègues′s ships were not yet ready for sea, but once aboard Impérial, Leissègues ordered his ships to get underway and sail westward along the coast of Hispaniola toward Nizao.

In the resulting Battle of San Domingo, the French squadron maintained close formation, and the five French ships of the line formed a line of battle with Impérial second in line behind Alexandre and ahead of Diomède, Jupiter, and Brave. Duckworth ordered his squadron to concentrate fire on the three leading French ships of the line, and accordingly the flagship of Rear-Admiral Alexander Cochrane, the British 74-gun third-rate ship of the line HMS Northumberland, engaged Impérial closely, while another 74-gun third rate, HMS Spencer, opened fire on Impérial and Diomède simultaneously.

As the engagement at the head of the French line became confused, with ships of the two sides intermingled and smoke restricting visibility, Impérial engaged and threatened to overwhelm Duckworth′s flagship, the 74-gun third rate HMS Superb, which was leading the British line, but Cochrane placed Northumberland in between Impérial and Superb in an effort to protect Superb. Impérial inflicted severe damage on Northumberland, with some of her shots passing through Northumberland and striking Superb. As the battle continued, Impérial became increasingly isolated. The 98-gun second-rate ship of the line HMS Atlas steered toward Impérial, fired two broadsides into her, and then raked her. Atlas′s tiller then jammed and she was engaged by Diomède and the damaged Northumberland drifted out of the action, but the rest of the British squadron concentrated its fire on Impérial. Impérial′s mainmast and mizzenmast collapsed, most of her guns had been silenced, and she was losing her ability to maneuver, and Leissègues ordered her to turn toward shore.

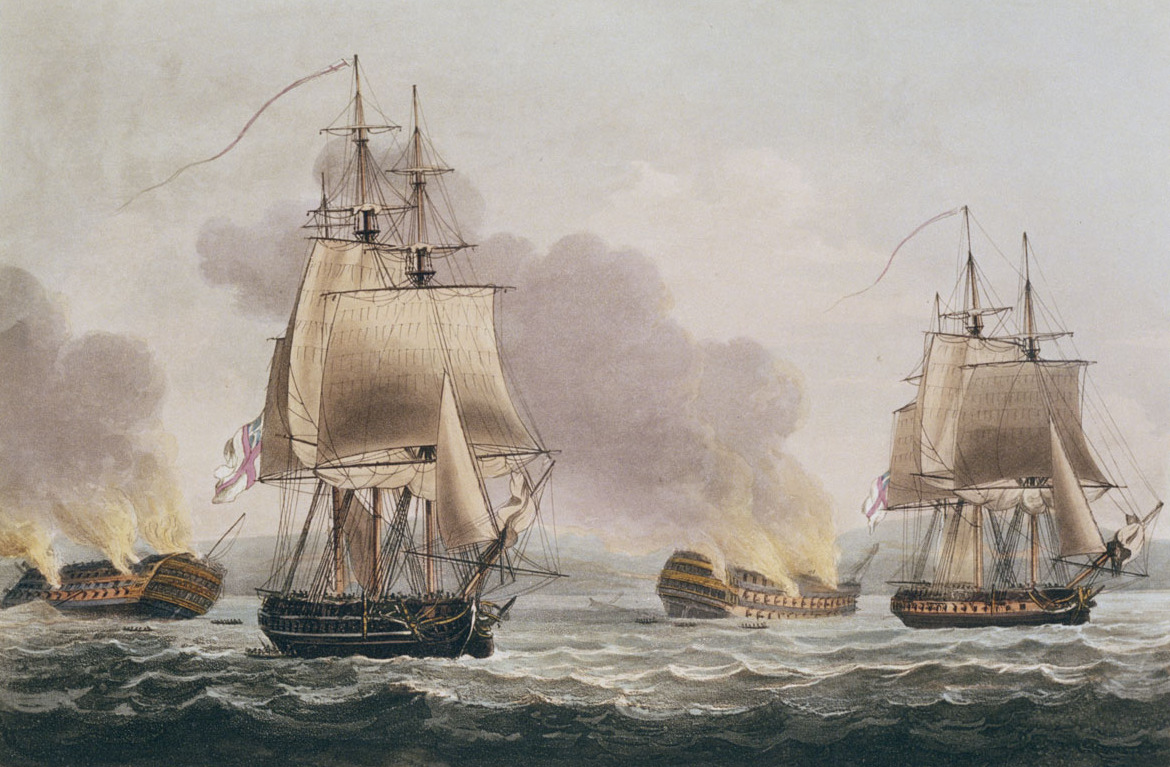
The burning wreck of Impérial (first from left) on 8 August 1806

Pursued by the 84-gun third-rate ship of the line HMS Canopus, Impérial ran hard aground parallel to the beach on a coral reef 1 nautical mile (1.9 km; 1.2 mi) off the coast of Hispaniola between Nizao and Point Catalan, suffering severe hull damage and losing all of her masts. The similarly damaged Diomède ran aground nearby. As the British ships moved out of gunnery range, the crews of Impérial and Diomède assembled on deck to abandon ship. Impérial had suffered about 500 casualties. Leissègues ordered Diomède and Impérial burned as soon as their crews had completed their abandonment of the ships, but before that order could be carried out, boat crews from the fifth-rate frigates HMS Acasta and HMS Magicienne boarded them on 8 February 1806 and captured them without meeting any resistance. The British boarding party took six prisoners aboard Impérial and then burned her wreck.
