= French ship Diomède (1803) =

Ship of the line of the French Navy

- Scale model of Achille, sister ship of French ship Diomède (1803), on display at the Musée national de la Marine in Paris.

History

France
- Name: Diomède
- Launched: 1 August 1799 as Union
- Renamed: Diomède 1803
- Fate: Wrecked 6 February 1806; Burned 8 February 1806

General characteristics
- Class & type: Téméraire-class ship of the line
- Displacement: 3,069 tonneaux
- Tons burthen: 1,537 port tonneaux
- Length: 55.87 metres (183.3 ft) (172 pied)
- Beam: 14.90 metres (48 ft 11 in)
- Draught: 7.26 metres (23.8 ft) (22 pied)
- Propulsion: Up to 2,485 m^{2} (26,750 sq ft) of sails
- Armament: 74 guns: Lower gun deck: 28 × 36-pounder long guns; Upper gun deck: 30 × 18-pounder long guns; Forecastle and quarterdeck: 16 × 8-pounder long guns; 4 × 36-pounder carronades

Diomède was a 74-gun Téméraire-class ship of the line built for the French Navy at Lorient and launched in 1799 as Union . She was renamed Diomède in 1803.

During the War of the Third Coalition, Diomède was part of a French force that sailed from Brest, France, on 13 December 1805 for what was planned as a 14-month cruise to attack British merchant shipping while avoiding combat with major Royal Navy forces. On 15 December 1805, the French force split into two squadrons which proceeded independently from one another. Diomède was part of the squadron under the overall command of Vice-Admiral Corentin-Urbain Leissègues, which headed across the Atlantic Ocean bound for the Caribbean. During the voyage, Diomède suffered serious damage in a storm off the Azores in late December 1805. She arrived with most of the squadron at French-held Santo Domingo on Hispaniola on 20 January 1806, where Leissègues ordered the ships to be recaulked after their long and difficult transatlantic voyage.

On the morning of 6 February 1806, a Royal Navy squadron under the command of Vice-Admiral Sir John Thomas Duckworth arrived off Santo Domingo to attack Leissègues's force. Although several of Leissègues's ships were not yet ready for sea, Leissègues ordered them to get underway and sail westward along the coast of Hispaniola toward Nizao. In the resulting Battle of San Domingo, the French squadron maintained close formation, and the five French ships of the line formed a line of battle with Diomède third in line behind Alexandre and Impérial and ahead of Jupiter and Brave. Duckworth ordered his squadron to concentrate fire on the three leading French ships of the line, and accordingly the British 74-gun third-rate ship of the line HMS Spencer opened fire on Impérial and Diomède simultaneously. As the engagement at the head of the French line became confused, with ships of the two sides intermingled and smoke restricting visibility, Diomède came across the 98-gun second-rate ship of the line HMS Atlas and fired a heavy broadside into her, after which Atlas engaged her at close range. Spencer also resumed firing at Diomède. Impérial turned toward shore and Diomède followed her, and late in the morning both ships ran aground parallel to the beach on a reef 1 nautical mile (1.9 km; 1.2 mi) off the coast of Hispaniola between Nizao and Point Catalan, suffering severe hull damage and losing all of their masts. As the British ships moved out of gunnery range, the crews of Diomède and Impérial assembled on deck to abandon ship. Diomède had suffered about 250 casualties.

Leissègues ordered Diomède and Impérial burned as soon as their crews had completed their abandonment of the ships, but before that order could be carried out, boat crews from the fifth-rate frigates HMS Acasta and HMS Magicienne boarded them on 8 February 1806 and captured them without meeting any resistance. The British boarding party took 150 prisoners aboard Diomède including her commanding officer, Captain Jean-Baptiste Henry, and then burned her wreck.

== Bibliography ==
- Clowes, William Laird (1997) [1900]. The Royal Navy, A History from the Earliest Times to 1900, Volume V. Chatham Publishing. ISBN 1-86176-014-0.
- Gardiner, Robert, ed. (2001) [1998]. The Victory of Seapower. Caxton Editions. ISBN 1-84067-359-1.
- James, William (2002) [1827]. The Naval History of Great Britain, Volume 4, 1805–1807. Conway Maritime Press. ISBN 0-85177-908-5.
- Winfield, Rif and Roberts, Stephen S. (2015) French Warships in the Age of Sail 1786-1861: Design, Construction, Careers and Fates. Seaforth Publishing. ISBN 978-1-84832-204-2
