= HMS Spencer (1800) =

British ship of the line (1800–1822)

- Spencer

History

Great Britain
- Name: HMS Spencer
- Ordered: 19 September 1795
- Builder: Adams, Bucklers Hard
- Laid down: September 1795
- Launched: 10 May 1800
- Honours and awards: Naval General Service Medal with clasps: "Gut of Gibraltar 12 July 1801"; "St. Domingo"
- Fate: Broken up, 1822

General characteristics
- Class & type: 74-gun third-rate ship of the line
- Tons burthen: 1917 (bm)
- Length: 180 ft 10 in (55.12 m) (gundeck)
- Beam: 49 ft 3 in (15.01 m)
- Depth of hold: 21 ft 10 in (6.65 m)
- Sail plan: Full-rigged ship
- Armament: Gundeck: 28 × 32-pounder guns; Upper gundeck: 30 × 18-pounder guns; QD: 12 × 9-pounder guns; Fc: 4 × 9-pounder guns

HMS Spencer was a 74-gun third-rate ship of the line of the Royal Navy, launched on 10 May 1800 at Bucklers Hard. Her designer was the French émigré shipwright Jean-Louis Barrallier. She served in two major battles, Algeciras Bay and San Domingo, and in a number of other campaigns. She was broken up in 1822.

== Wartime career ==
Captain Henry D'Esterre Darby commissioned Spencer in June 1800.

=== Battle of Algeciras Bay ===
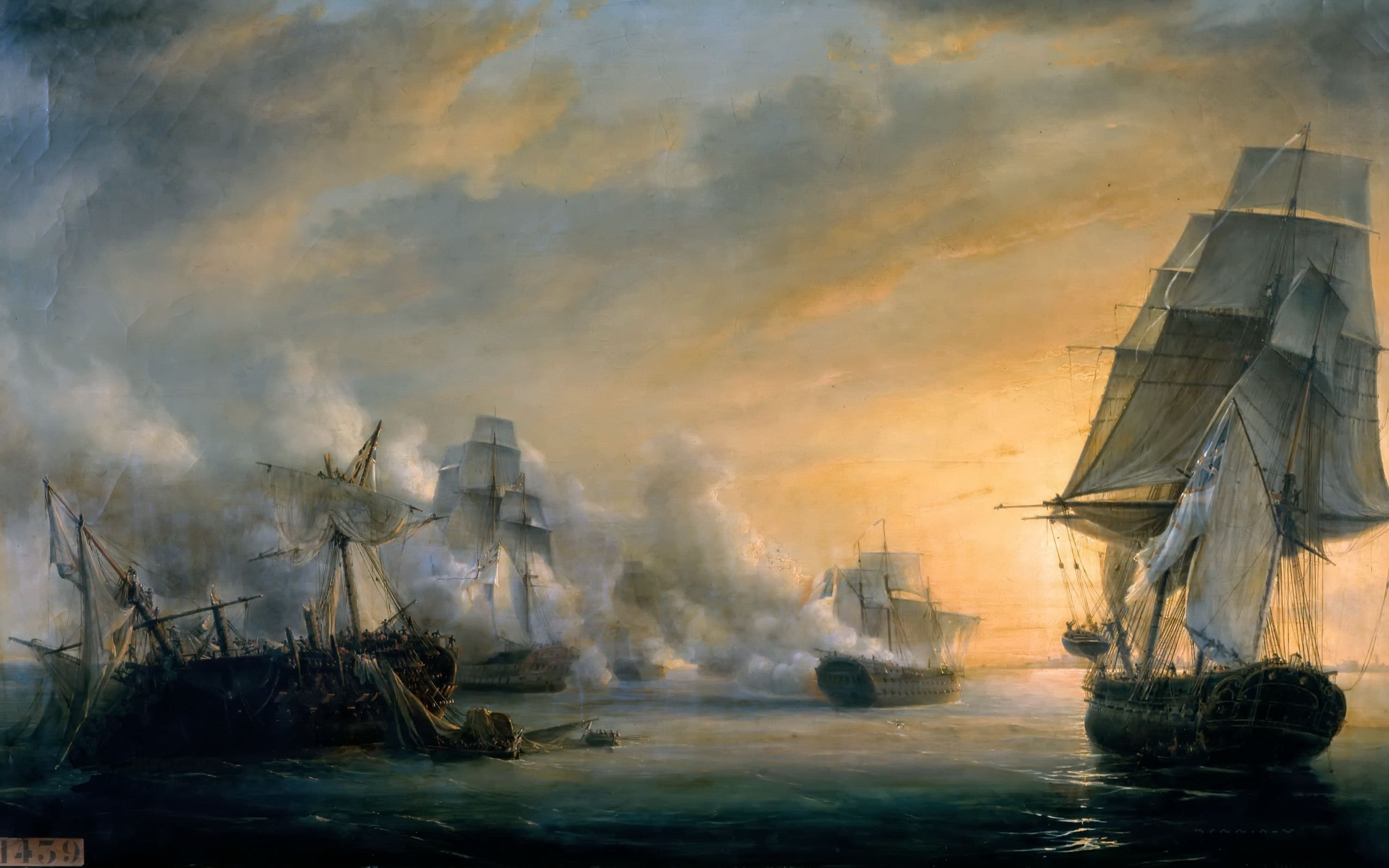
Naval combat between the French ship Formidable commanded by Captain Troude, and three British naval ships, Caesar, Spencer, Venerable and the frigate Thames in sight of Cadiz, 13 July 1801

By July 1801 Spencer was at the Rock of Gibraltar in the squadron under the command of Rear Admiral James Saumarez in Caesar On 6 July Saumarez sailed from Gibraltar with Caesar, Pompee, Spencer, Venerable, Hannibal and Audacious with the intention of attacking Admiral Linois's squadron of three French line-of-battle ships and a frigate, which were lying a considerable distance from the batteries at Algeciras. As Venerable, the leading ship, approached the wind dropped and she was forced to anchor. Pompee managed to get into action but Hannibal grounded and was forced to strike. In the battle the British drove two of the French ships ashore and badly damaged the rest. The total loss in the British squadron was 121 killed, 240 wounded, and 14 missing. The Franco-Spanish force lost 317 men killed and some 3-500 wounded.

On 8 July a squadron of five Spanish ships-of-the-line, a French 74, three frigates and a large number of gunboats reinforced the French ships. Hard work repaired all the British ships at Gibraltar, except Pompee in time for them to follow the Franco-Spanish fleet when it sailed on 12 July. In the subsequent second phase of the Battle of Algeciras Bay, the two first rates Real Carlos and Hermenegildo fired upon each other during the night, caught fire and exploded, with tremendous loss of life. The British captured the third rate St Antoine. In 1847 the Admiralty authorized the issue of the Naval General Service Medal with clasp "Gut of Gibraltar 12 July 1801" to all surviving claimants from the battle; 192 medals were issued.

Spencer joined Admiral Robert Calder's squadron in October 1801. In December she sailed in chase to the West Indies.

In May 1803 Captain Robert Stopford recommissioned Spencer. On 28 August Spencer recaptured the East Indiaman Lord Nelson. On 28 May she recaptured Castle Douglas, and the next month, on 10 June, she recaptured Lord North. On 20 November Spencer captured Virgin del Brien Consiglio, and then nine days later, Nostra Senora del Carmen, J. de Moro, Master.

=== San Domingo ===
Spencer joined Admiral Nelson off Toulon in August 1804. Spencer was then part of a squadron off Cadiz under Vice-admiral John Duckworth, when news reached Duckworth that two French squadrons had sailed from Brest in December 1805. Duckworth took his squadron to Barbados to search for them, eventually sighting Leissègues' squadron off San Domingo on 6 February 1806. Duckworth organised his ships into two lines, the weather line consisting of Superb, Northumberland and Spencer, while the lee line consisted of Agamemnon, Canopus, Donegal and Atlas. The lines moved to attack the French ships and the battle broke out.

During the battle, Superb badly damaged the French 74-gun Indivisible, leaving her adrift, her rigging shot off and her rudder destroyed. Spencer then took Indivisible. The battle was a victory for the Royal Navy, and Stopford and the other captains received a Naval Gold Medal for their actions. In 1847 the Admiralty authorized the issue of the Naval General Service Medal with clasp "St. Domingo" to all surviving claimants from the battle; 396 medals were issued.

Next, Stopford and Spencer participated in the British invasions of the Río de la Plata and Battle of Copenhagen.

=== Raid off Kristiansand ===
Spencer arrived off Kristiansand, Norway on 18 September 1807 with two other ships. The ships withdrew after they were fired on by Christiansholm Fortress. The ship's commander decided to occupy the abandoned Fredriksholm Fortress in the Kristiansand fjord, and demolish it. Charges were laid but after waiting some time for the explosion, men were sent back to check if the fuses had gone out. They had not, and four of the men were killed in the resulting explosion.

In April 1808 Captain John Quilliam took command and sailed Spencer in the Channel, where she served as the flagship for now Admiral Stopford.

=== American War of 1812 ===
Spencer underwent major repairs at Plymouth from October 1811 until March 1814. Captain Richard Raggett recommissioned her in January 1814, during the American War of 1812, and sailed her to British North America, escorting a convoy, remaining on the North America Station. Later in 1814 he patrolled in the Gulf of Maine. After a failed and embarrassing September attempt to gain ransom from a little coaster out of Boston, Raggett turned his wrath on lightly defended Cape Cod towns. Eastham coughed up over $1,200 and Brewster paid $4,000 to avoid bombardment. Bolder people resided in Barnstable and Orleans. The two towns rejected Raggett's demands and prepared to resist. Raggett decided to move on, but locals tagged his ship with the nickname "Terror of the Bay". Earlier, Spencer shared in the capture of the American brigantine Superb.

After a successful cruise in the summer of 1814 during which she captured the Royal Navy schooner Landrail, the American privateer Syren returned to the United States but as she approached the Delaware River the British blockading ships gave chase. To escape the boats of Spencer and Telegraph, on 16 November Syren ran ashore under Cape May. Her crew set her on fire before making their escape. (Note: Ragget's share of the bounty was £32 4s 3¼d; an ordinary seaman's share was 3s 6¾d.)

== Post-war career ==
From August 1815, Spencer served as a guardship in Plymouth under the command of Captain William Robert Broughton. On 16 March 1817, Wolf, a tender to Spencer, captured two smuggling boats, Albeona and Two Brothers, and their cargo. Wolf was in company with the revenue cruiser Vigilant. (Note: Broughton's share of prize money was £45 12s 3d; that of an ordinary seaman was 4s 2d.) In 1818 Captain Sir Thomas Hardy replaced Broughton.

Captain Samuel Rowley replaced Hardy in September. Spencer then served as the flagship for Rear Admiral Sir Josias Rowley at Cork. Sir Thomas Lavie replaced Rowley in turn in December 1821.

== Fate ==
Spencer was broken up at Plymouth in April 1822.
