= French frigate Comète (1796) =

History

France
- Name: Comète
- Namesake: Comet
- Laid down: October 1794
- Launched: 11 March 1796
- In service: January 1798
- Fate: Broken up in 1810

General characteristics
- Class & type: Romaine-class frigate
- Displacement: 700 tonnes (690 long tons)
- Length: 45.5 m (149 ft 3 in)
- Beam: 11.8 m (38 ft 9 in)
- Draught: 5 m (16 ft 5 in)
- Propulsion: Sail
- Armament: 40 guns: 24 × 24-pounders; 16 × 8-pounders
- Armour: Timber

Comète was a Romaine-class frigate of the French Navy. She took part in the Atlantic campaign of 1806 and in the Battle of San Domingo.

== Construction ==
Comète was laid down at Le Havre, France, in October 1794 and launched on 11 March 1796. She entered service in January 1798.

== Service history ==
On 19 February 1806, Comète, the frigate Félicité, and the corvette Diligente captured and burned the American vessel Lark, Moore, master, which was sailing from Philadelphia, Pennsylvania, to Jamaica. (Note: The report in Lloyd's List refers to the "brig Diligente". The French navy had a brig Diligent, but she was not in the area.)

From June 1808, Comète served as a mast machine at Bayonne, France. She was broken up in 1810.
