= French ship Constitution =

Ship of the line of the French Navy

- Scale model of Achille, sister ship of French ship Constitution, on display at the Musée national de la Marine in Paris.

History

France
- Name: Viala
- Namesake: Joseph Agricol Viala
- Builder: Lorient
- Launched: 28 September 1795
- Renamed: Voltaire in 1795; Constitution in 1795; Jupiter in 1803
- Captured: 6 February 1806

United Kingdom
- Name: Maida
- Namesake: Battle of Maida
- Fate: Broken up in June 1817

General characteristics
- Class & type: Téméraire-class ship of the line
- Displacement: 3,069 tonneaux
- Tons burthen: 1,537 port tonneaux French service; 1,899 (bm) British service
- Length: 55.87 m (183.3 ft) (172 French feet)
- Beam: 14.90 m (48.9 ft) (44' 6"; French)
- Draught: 7.26 m (23.8 ft) (22 French feet)
- Sail plan: Full-rigged ship (sail area up to 2485 m^{2})

General characteristics (French service)
- Complement: 3 officers + 690 men
- Armament: Lower gundeck: 28 × 36-pounder long guns; Upper gundeck: 30 × 18-pounder long guns; Fc and QD:16 × 8-pounder long guns + 4 × 36-pounder carronades

General characteristics (British service)
- Complement: 121 officers and men
- Armament: Lower deck: 30 × 24-pounder guns; Upper deck: 24 × 24-pounder guns; QD: 2 × 24-pounder guns + 12 × 24-pounder carronades; Fc: 2 × 24-pounder guns + 2 × 24-pounder carronades

Constitution was a 74-gun Téméraire-class ship of the line built for the French Navy launched as Viala (or Vialla) in 1795. The Royal Navy captured her in 1806 and sold her in 1814.

== French service ==
Between 1794 and 1795, the French successively named her Viala (in honour of Joseph Agricol Viala), Voltaire (in honour of François-Marie Arouet), and Constitution (after the Constitution of the National Convention).

In the winter of 1796–1797, she took part in the Expédition d'Irlande. She managed to reach Bantry Bay, where on 22 December 1797 she was damaged in a collision with Révolution.

Between 29 September 1800 and 18 June 1802, she underwent fitting at Toulon. In 1802, she was recommissioned in Toulon, under Captain Faure.

On 5 February 1803, she was renamed again to Jupiter. On 13 December 1805 she joined Vice-Admiral Corentin Urbain Leissègues's squadron bound for Santo Domingo, under Captain Laignel. On 27 December she separated from the squadron in a gale. She rejoined the squadron on 24 January 1806 at Saint Domingue.

Donegal, while serving in a Royal Navy squadron under the command of Vice Admiral Duckworth, captured her at the Battle of San Domingo (6 February 1806). In the battle, Jupiter lost some 200 men killed and wounded; Donegal had 12 men killed and 33 wounded. (Note: In November 1807 prize money was paid. The amount for a petty officer on Donegal £14 8s 2d; the amount for a seaman was £2 14s 2d.)

== British service ==
Jupiter (second from left) at the Battle of San Domingo

Jupiter arrived in Portsmouth on 6 May 1806. The Royal Navy then commissioned her as Maida, in honour of the Battle of Maida, the name Jupiter being already used for the 50-gun fourth rate Jupiter. She was commissioned in February 1807 under Captain Samuel Hood Linzee.

Maida was one of the vessels at the Second Battle of Copenhagen. There she landed a party of seamen who manned the breaching battery before the city. Because she was one of the vessels present at the seizure of the Danish fleet on 7 September, her officers and crew were entitled to share in the prize money. (Note: The share for an able seaman was £3 8s.) By the end of the year she was back in Portsmouth.

On 26 October 1807, Tsar Alexander I of Russia declared war on Great Britain. The official news did not arrive there until 2 December, at which time the British declared an embargo on all Russian vessels in British ports. Maida was one of some 70 vessels that shared in the proceeds of the seizure of the 44-gun Russian frigate Speshnoy (Speshnyy), and the Russian storeship Wilhelmina (or Vilghemina) then in Portsmouth harbour. The Russian vessels were carrying the payroll for Vice-Admiral Dmitry Senyavin's squadron in the Mediterranean. (Note: Consequently, a seaman on any one of the 70 British vessels received 14s 7½d in prize money.)

Maida was paid off at Portsmouth on 9 March 1808 and placed into ordinary. In 1813 she came under the command of Captain John Hayes. She remained in ordinary, i.e., she was not recommissioned, but served as flagship at Portsmouth to Rear-Admiral Edward Griffith Colpoys.

== Fate ==
On 25 July 1814 the Principal Officers and Commissioners of His Majesty's Navy put her up for sale. The conditions of sale included that the purchaser was to give a bond, with two sureties for £3000, that they would not sell or otherwise dispose of the ship but that they would break her up within twelve months from the date of sale. She was sold on 11 August 1814 for £4,700.
