= Battle of San Domingo =

1806 battle of the War of the Third Coalition

- Part of the War of the Third Coalition and the Caribbean campaign of 1803–1810
- Duckworth's Action off San Domingo, 6 February 1806; Nicholas Pocock, 1808
Date	6 February 1806
Location	Off Santo Domingo, Caribbean Sea 18°18′N 70°03′W
Result	British victory

Belligerents
United Kingdom	France

Commanders and leaders
Sir John Duckworth	Corentin de Leissègues

Strength
7 ships of the line 2 frigates 2 brigs (OOB)	5 ships of the line 2 frigates 1 corvette (OOB)

Casualties and losses
74 killed 264 wounded	1,510 killed or wounded 1,156 captured 3 ships of the line captured 2 ships of the line wrecked

The Battle of San Domingo was a naval battle of the War of the Third Coalition fought on 6 February 1806 between squadrons of French and British ships of the line off the southern coast of the French-occupied Captaincy General of Santo Domingo (San Domingo in contemporary English-language accounts) in the Caribbean.

All five of the French ships of the line commanded by Counter-admiral Corentin Urbain de Leissègues were captured or destroyed. The Royal Navy led by Vice-Admiral of the Blue Sir John Duckworth lost no ships and suffered fewer than a hundred killed while the French lost approximately 1,500 men. Only a small number of the French squadron were able to escape.

The battle was the last major engagement of the French Revolutionary and Napoleonic Wars between British and French ships of the line in open water.

== Background ==
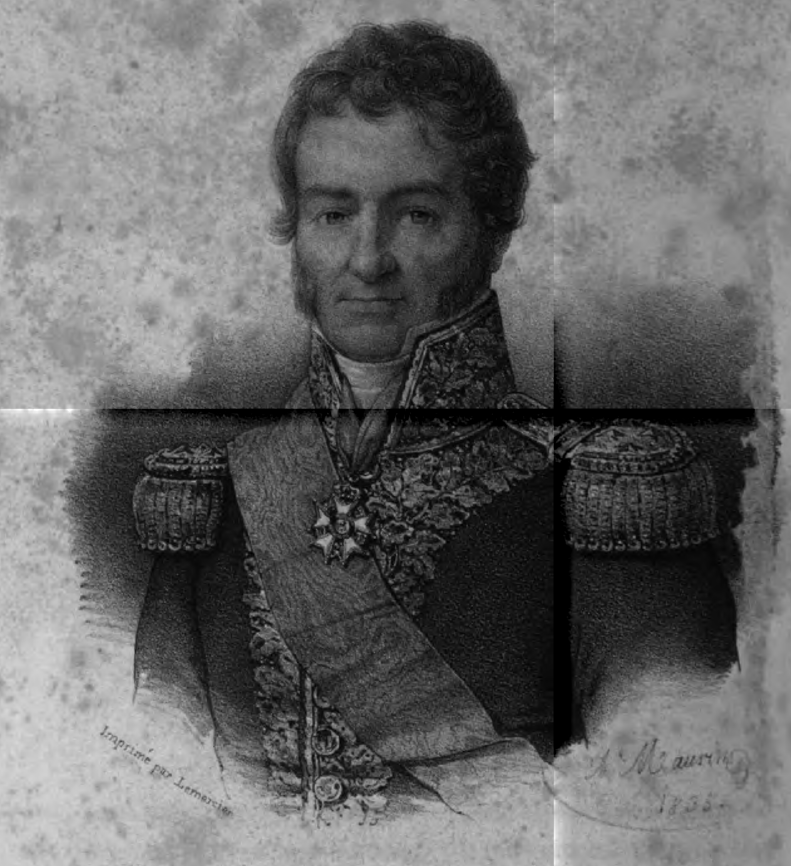
1835 portrait of de Leissègues

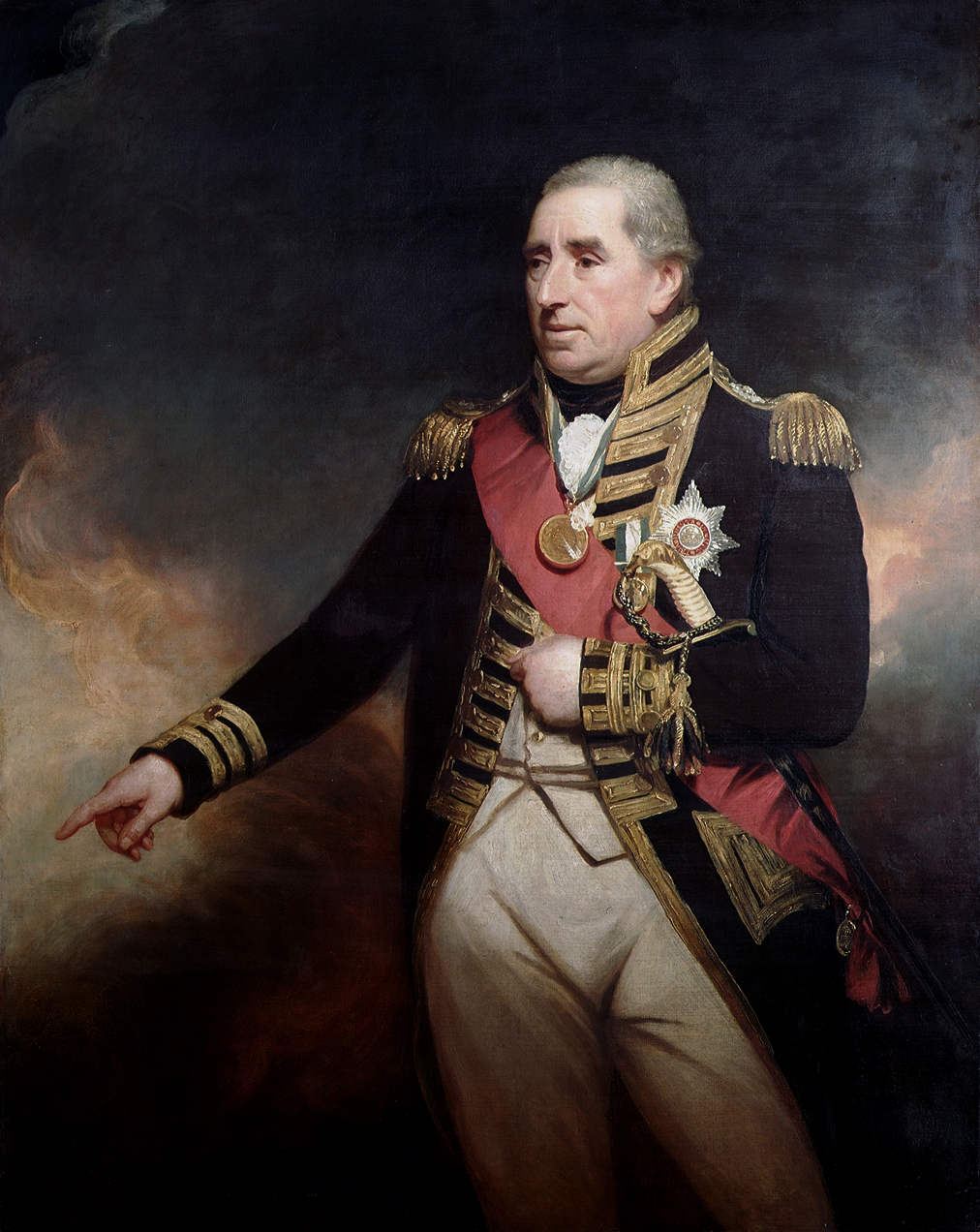
1809 portrait of Duckworth

In late 1805, First Lord of the Admiralty Lord Barham withdrew the Royal Navy blockade of the French Atlantic ports following the Trafalgar campaign, in which the French Navy had lost 14 ships of the line. Barham believed that the French, having suffered such heavy losses, would be unable and unwilling to launch a major offensive in the Atlantic until after the winter. However, he had miscalculated the strength of the fleet at Brest, the principal French Atlantic seaport.

Taking advantage of the withdrawal of the British blockade, Emperor Napoleon ordered two squadrons to put to sea with orders to raid the British trade routes that crossed the Atlantic. These forces were to inflict as much economic damage to Britain as possible without engaging an equivalent British naval squadron and risking defeat and capture. The cruise was expected to last as long as 14 months, sustained by captured food supplies from British merchant ships. Sailing unopposed on 13 December 1805, the squadrons separated two days later in pursuit of British merchant convoys, one squadron steering for the South Atlantic under Counter-admiral Jean-Baptiste Philibert Willaumez and the other, under Counter-admiral Corentin Urbain de Leissègues, sailing for the Caribbean. The British Admiralty did not discover that the French had sailed until 24 December, and the two squadrons they prepared in pursuit, under Rear-Admiral of the Blue Sir Richard Strachan and Vice-Admiral of the Blue Sir John Borlase Warren, did not sail until January 1806, by which time the French had disappeared into the Atlantic.

There was however one British squadron that had maintained contact with the French: since the Battle of Trafalgar in October 1805, the Admiralty had stationed a squadron under Vice-Admiral of the Blue Sir John Duckworth off Cádiz to watch the remnants of the combined fleet. In November 1805, reports reached Duckworth of a French squadron operating against British convoys off the Savage Islands between Madeira and the Canary Islands. This squadron, which belonged to Counter-admiral Zacharie Allemand, had left France in July 1805. Immediately sailing to investigate, Duckworth abandoned Cádiz, leaving just two frigates to watch the Allied fleet at anchor. Passing the Savage and Canary Islands, Duckworth continued to the Cape Verde Islands before conceding that the French had escaped him and turning northwards again. Allemand was already far to the north. He eventually returned to France without incident on 23 December.

=== Duckworth's cruise ===
During his return journey to Cádiz, on 23 December Duckworth encountered HMS Arethusa under Captain Charles Brisbane escorting a small group of merchant ships. Leissègues had intercepted, chased and dispersed Brisbane's convoy in the Bay of Biscay on 15 December, Brisbane retaining only the largest merchant ships to help cover the flight of the smaller vessels. Once he had escaped Leissègues' pursuit, Brisbane sailed in search of support at Cádiz, continuing southwards after realizing that Duckworth was not at his appointed station. Immediately setting a course that he believed would intercept Leissègues, Duckworth turned to the northwest and on 25 December discovered an enemy squadron approximately 200 nautical miles (370 km) northwest of the Canary Islands. Duckworth ordered his squadron to pursue, the chase lasting throughout the day and continuing into 26 December, by which time it had become clear that his quarry was not Allemand. In fact, Duckworth had discovered Willaumez's squadron. However, Willaumez ordered his ships to run before Duckworth rather than give battle. By 13:00 on 26 December, it seemed certain that the British flagship, HMS Superb, Captain Richard Goodwin Keats, would outstrip the rearmost French ship, when Duckworth suddenly called off the pursuit. He later claimed that he was concerned that the leading ships of his squadron would be overwhelmed by the concentrated French squadron before the stragglers, some of which were more than 45 nautical miles (83 km) behind Superb, could join the battle.

As Willaumez escaped into the South Atlantic, Duckworth ordered his squadron to sail for Barbados to resupply before making the long journey back to Cádiz. When he arrived on 12 January 1806, he ordered the frigate HMS Acasta to Saint Kitts to arrange the required water supplies, and moved the squadron to an anchorage off Basseterre on 19 January. There two ships of the Leeward Islands squadron, HMS Northumberland and HMS Atlas, joined him. Northumberland was the flagship of Rear-Admiral of the White Alexander Cochrane, commander of the station. Cochrane's arrival raised the number of admirals in the squadron to three, as Duckworth's second in command was Rear-Admiral of the White Thomas Louis in HMS Canopus. Leissègues was also en route to the Caribbean, winter storms off the Azores having delayed him, separated Alexandre and Brave and inflicted damage on Jupiter and Diomède. Arriving at the French-held city of Santo Domingo on the island of Hispaniola on 20 January, Leissègues disembarked over 1,000 soldiers as reinforcements for the garrison, and made hasty repairs as he awaited the arrival of his missing ships, which appeared on 29 January. During his time in the harbour, Leissègues moved ashore and gave orders for the ships to be recaulked following their Atlantic voyage, a difficult and time-consuming process.

On 1 February the small sloop-of-war HMS Kingfisher arrived at Basseterre with information that three French ships of the line had been sighted off Santo Domingo. Duckworth gave orders for the fleet to sail immediately. On 3 February the brig HMS Epervier joined him at Saint Thomas and on 5 February the frigate HMS Magicienne under Captain Adam Mackenzie joined near the Mona Passage. Mackenzie was accompanied by a Danish schooner that had sailed from Santo Domingo a few days before, and whose crew were able to provide a detailed account of the French squadron's composition. Before the schooner had sailed, a number of French officers had commented on the risk involved in allowing the vessel to leave port, but Leissègues rejected their demands that he order the Danish ship burnt. Duckworth was now confident that he outnumbered and outgunned Leissègues. During the night of 5 February the British squadron slowly approached Santo Domingo, Acasta and Magicienne scouting ahead of the main fleet.

== Battle ==
=== Duckworth's attack ===
At 06:00 on 6 February Duckworth's scouts sighted the French, observing two frigates, five ships of the line and one large merchant ship anchored in line at the entrance to Santo Domingo. Leissègues had reportedly issued orders for the squadron to sail for Jamaica, even though several of the French ships were not yet ready for sea, and two frigates were already under sail when the British arrived. Leissègues was not aboard Impérial; he and a number of his officers were still conducting their business in the town and were therefore forced to join the squadron in small boats, which delayed the squadron. Several officers, possibly including Leissègues, did not reach their ships until after the engagement had begun. Recognising that his enemy was in a vulnerable position, Duckworth raised all sail in an effort to close with the French. Leissègues too recognised the danger his ships were in and ordered them to raise anchor and then to sail westwards along the coast in the direction of Nizao. (Note: Several sources, including Gardiner, give the location of the anchored French squadron as Ocoa Bay, approximately 25 miles (40 km) west of Santo Domingo. However, Duckworth, in his despatch to the Admiralty, states that "the Enemy were in a compact Line, under all sail, going before the Wind to Cape Nisao, to Windward of Ocoa [sic] Bay", placing the engagement in the "Bay of St. Domingue" instead.) Maintaining close formation, the French formed a line of battle, Captain Pierre-Elie Garreau in Alexandre leading, with Impérial, Diomède, Jupiter and Brave following. The frigates and corvette took a position between the battle line and the shore. Duckworth was concerned that there might be other French forces to the west. He therefore angled his line of attack to pass across the front of the French line and signaled to his squadron to direct their fire at the front three ships: Alexandre, Impérial and Diomède.

At 08:00 Duckworth's ships divided into two divisions, a westerly line to windward under Duckworth with Superb, Northumberland, HMS Spencer and HMS Agamemnon, and an eastern line under Louis with Canopus, HMS Donegal and Atlas. The British frigates were gathered in formation to the west of the British lines, awaiting orders to assist if required. Over the next two hours the British slowly closed with the French squadron, the British divisions breaking up as the faster ships outpaced the slower. Louis' squadron fell behind Duckworth's, while Agamemnon dropped behind the other three vessels in her division, which otherwise remained in a tight formation. A slight shift in the wind allowed Leissègues to adjust his direction to the southwest, but the close presence of the land restricted French movements. Keats and his crew having accompanied Nelson in the pursuit of Villeneuve to the West Indies were still lamenting having missed Trafalgar. Keats silently suspended a portrait of Nelson from the mizzen stay before addressing the men in a manner intended to encourage enthusiasm for the cause in the coming battle. With the band playing ‘God save the King’ and ‘Nelson of the Nile’ the Superb having made up all ground on the fleeing enemy fired her starboard broadside as she was laid up against the Imperiale, the largest ship in the French navy before the conflict became general. In a few minutes Northumberland was engaged with the Alexandre and Imperiale, quickly followed by the Spencer who made the Diomede her more immediate opponent.

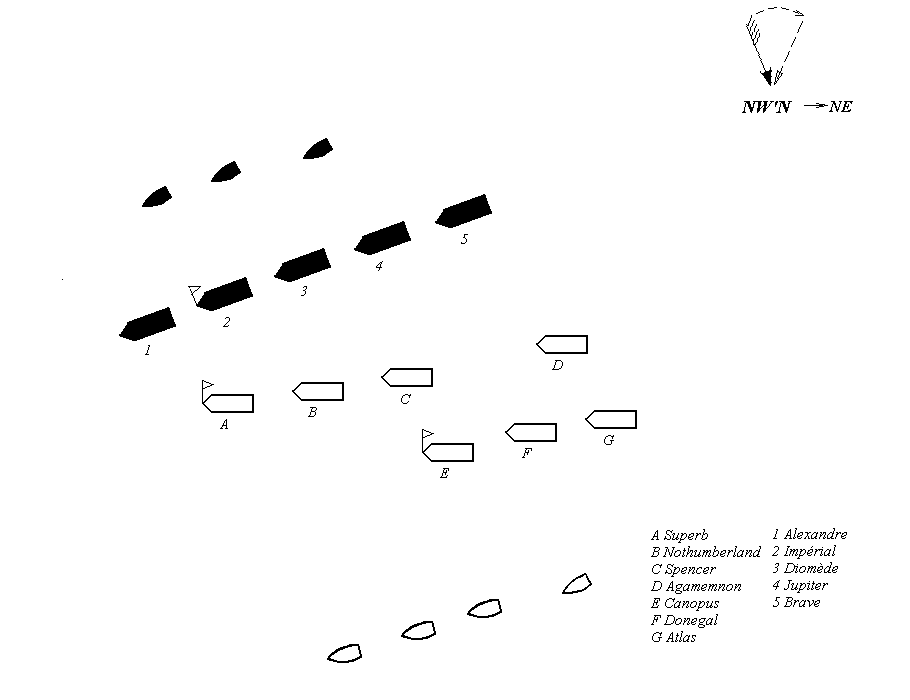
Map of the battle at around 10am

Leissègues' flagship Impérial carried 120 guns to Northumberland's 74, but Cochrane engaged closely, rapidly supported by Spencer, which opened fire on Impérial and Diomède simultaneously. For 15 minutes the British continued to close, both squadrons sailing westwards along the coast with the wind. At 10:25, the damaged Alexandre suddenly swung out of the line in an attempt to drive between Spencer and Northumberland and rake them both. Captain Robert Stopford on Spencer responded rapidly, turning across Alexandre's bow and raking her, before pulling along the opposite side of Garreau's Alexandre and opening fire from close range. In the smoke and confusion neither Superb nor Northumberland noticed Spencer's move; both fired several shots into Spencer before they realized their mistake. With Spencer and Alexandre out of the way, Impérial was able to engage both of the leading British ships, threatening to overwhelm them. Cochrane moved to defend the flagship by pulling Northumberland between Impérial and Superb, suffering terrible damage but preserving Duckworth's ship intact. Impérial's fire was so heavy that several shot passed straight through Northumberland into Superb.

=== Destruction of the French rear ===
As the combat raged at the head of the line, the remainder of both squadrons strained to join the battle. The British eastern division under Louis reached the battling Alexandre and Spencer at 10:35, the two ships locked together to the south of the main engagement. As they passed, Canopus, Donegal, and Atlas all raked the French ship, bringing down her masts and leaving her crippled. Canopus then steered directly towards the battle around Impérial, as Donegal and Atlas turned northwest to intercept Brave and Jupiter respectively. At 11:00, Spencer followed Canopus while Alexandre's crew were preoccupied with extinguishing a fire that had broken out on board. Alexandre was so badly damaged that she was unable to either escape or continue the action; she formally surrendered ten minutes later.

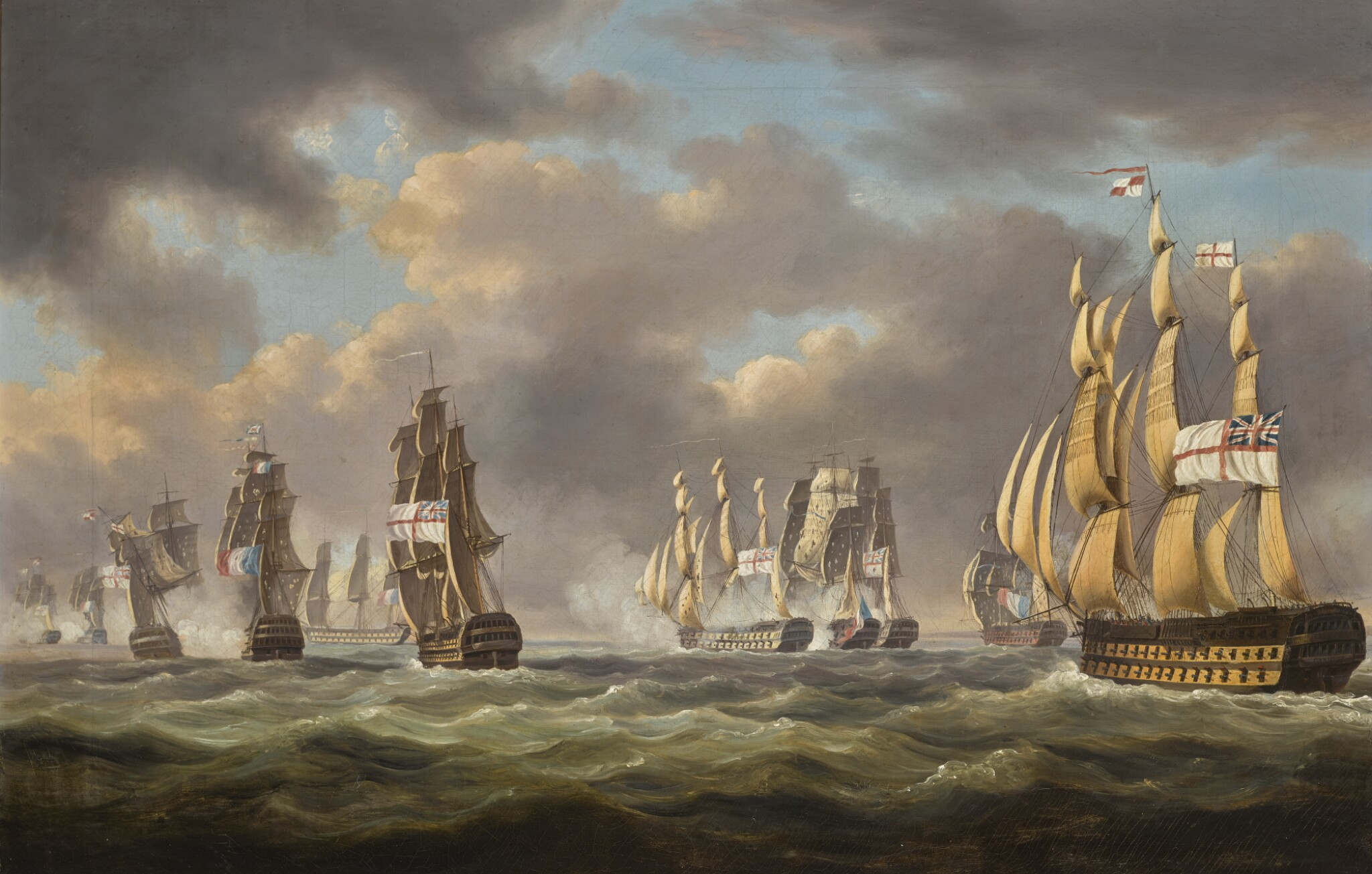
Painting of the battle by Robert Dodd

Captain Pulteney Malcolm on Donegal attacked Brave directly, firing his starboard guns and then crossing Brave's stern, inflicting severe damage with a raking broadside, before pulling alongside again and engaging from close range. Badly damaged, Brave surrendered. Malcolm then ordered Captain Richard Dunn in Acasta to take possession as Donegal moved forward to engage Jupiter. With Donegal alongside Jupiter, Captain Samuel Pym in Atlas abandoned his brief engagement with the French ship and steered for the melee surrounding the increasingly isolated Impérial. Taking advantage of his ship's superior speed, Malcolm pulled ahead of Jupiter and then rammed her bow, securing the ships together to prevent the French vessel from escaping. Recognising that further resistance was hopeless, Captain Gaspard Laignel surrendered immediately. Malcolm then sent 100 men on board as a prize crew and attached a towline to the French ship, just as the trailing Agamemnon finally reached the battle.

=== Leissègues drives ashore ===
Under the shroud of heavy smoke that confused the positions and identities of the ships at the head of the line, manoeuvering became hazardous: Atlas fired two broadsides into Impérial as she arrived and then raked the French flagship before her tiller jammed just as Diomède loomed out the smoke. Receiving a heavy broadside from the French ship, Atlas subsequently collided with Canopus as she too appeared immediately ahead, tearing off her bowsprit in the collision. Turning back into the battle, Atlas engaged Diomède at close range as the rest of the British squadron concentrated their fire on the beleaguered Impérial, with the exception of the damaged Northumberland, which was drifting out of the line.

With his main and mizzen masts collapsed and escape impossible, Leissègues turned his ship towards the shore at 11:30, outdistancing the fire from the drifting Northumberland and leaving Superb behind, Duckworth reluctant to risk his ship in the shallow coastal shoals. Canopus maintained the pressure, pursuing the French flagship until it was clear at 11:40 that Impérial was hard aground on a coral reef, less than a mile from the beach. Diomède, under attack by Atlas and the recently returned Spencer, followed Impérial ashore. As they struck the reef, both French ships lost their remaining masts and suffered severe damage to their hulls. Their crews then gathered on deck and made preparations to abandon ship as the British squadron pulled back out of range of fire from the shore. During the engagement the French frigates and corvette had all slipped between the battling squadrons and the shoreline and escaped to the westwards. The British frigates were too preoccupied with boarding and towing prizes to initiate a chase.

=== Destruction of Impérial and Diomède ===
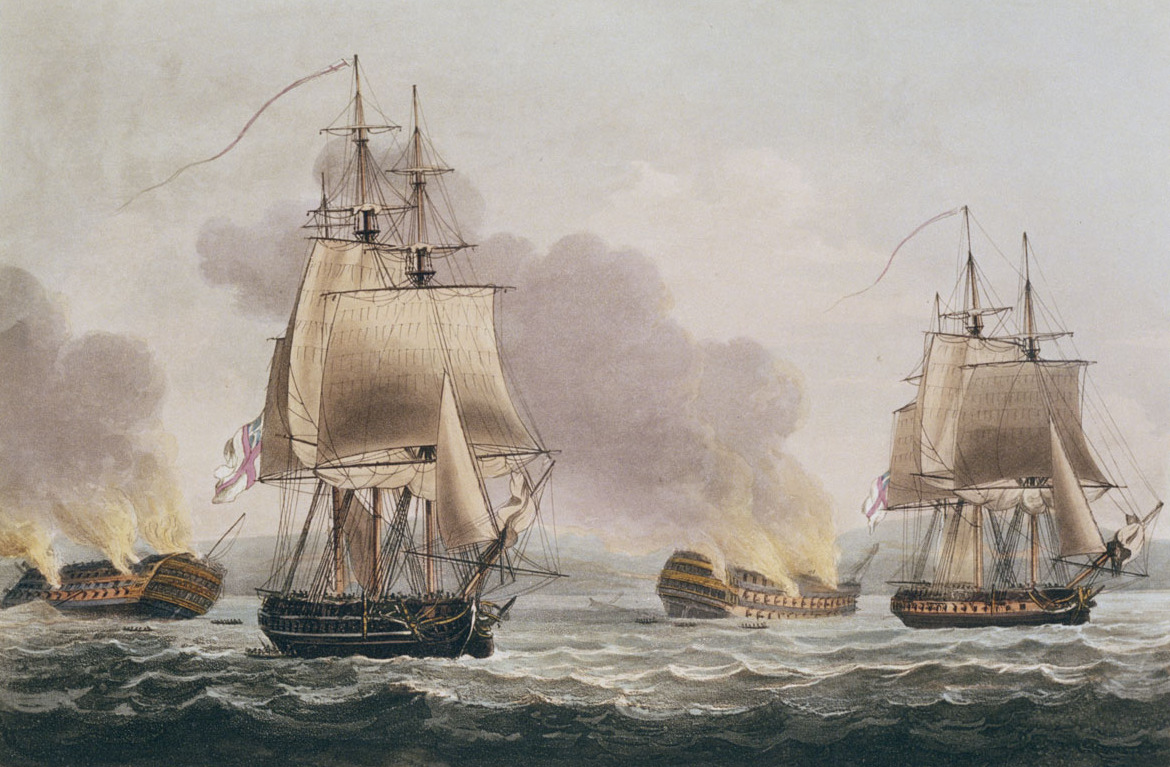
Acasta and Magicienne sailing away from Impérial and Diomède's wrecks on 8 February

As Duckworth gathered his squadron, Northumberland's mainmast collapsed across the deck, causing severe damage to the ship's fittings. Although Cochrane's flagship was the most severely damaged of the squadron, all had suffered to a degree: Superb's men counted 60 shot holes while Atlas was out of control and Donegal had lost one of her topmasts. Casualties were also distributed throughout the fleet, with Northumberland and Spencer suffering the worst and Atlas the least except for the barely engaged Agamemnon. Total losses were 74 killed and 264 wounded and several ships were damaged, but Duckworth was rapidly able to effect repairs as his ships remained on station to observe the situation ashore.

Impérial and Diomède had both run aground between Nizao and Point Catalan, their hulls broadside to the beach and their bottoms stove in by the reefs that lay offshore. Using the remaining ship's boats and with assistance from the shore, the wounded and survivors were ferried to the beach. These operations continued uninterrupted until 8 February, when Duckworth sent boats from Acasta and Magicienne to the wrecks. Boarding unopposed, the boat parties removed the remaining French crewmen as prisoners and set both ships on fire to deny their potential use to the French, although Leissègues had in fact already issued orders for them to be burnt once the last men had been evacuated. Her captain, Jean-Baptiste Henry, was among the 150 prisoners the British took from Diomède. By contrast, the British found only six men still aboard Impérial, none of them officers. French casualties in the engagement were very heavy, with over 500 men estimated to have been killed or wounded on Impérial alone and over 1,000 additional casualties shared among the rest of the fleet. Jupiter had not been severely damaged in the engagement and Brave, although damaged in the hull, was in a sailing condition. Both ships had surrendered early in the engagement after losing their captains killed or wounded, in the initial exchanges. Alexandre, by contrast, was a shattered wreck. Her British prize crew only just prevented the gaping holes smashed in her hull from sinking her.

Duckworth was fortunate to have with him captains on the Superb, Canopus, Spencer, and Donegal who had all been part of Nelson's Mediterranean fleet and who worked instinctively together, feeling no need to wait for any direction from the Admiral – for little was forthcoming. Duckworth remained at anchor off Santo Domingo for several more days until his entire squadron and their prizes were ready for the voyage to Jamaica, sending Commander Nathaniel Day Cochrane to Britain in Kingfisher with the official despatches. Admiral Cochrane separated from the fleet on the day of departure and Northumberland and Agamemnon sailed for Barbados in case other French forces should appear in the Leeward Islands while the main fleet was repairing at Jamaica. Duckworth was received at Jamaica with "rapturous acknowledgments" and his prizes were refitted for the journey back to Britain. In the event, Brave foundered off the Azores with the loss of three men, and Alexandre was too badly damaged for further service, being broken up on arrival. Only Jupiter, renamed HMS Maida after the recent French defeat at the Battle of Maida in Italy, had any continued career in the Royal Navy. The only surviving French ships, the frigates Comète and Félicité, and the corvette Diligente all returned to France without incident over the following months.

== Aftermath ==
The victory, just four months after the success at Trafalgar, was celebrated in Britain and across the Empire, particularly in the Caribbean. Mere rumours of Leissègues' presence had stifled trade and caused panic among the merchant houses of the West Indies and Duckworth's victory helped to restore confidence in commercial ocean travel once more. In Britain both the House of Commons and the House of Lords voted their thanks to the entire squadron when Duckworth's account of the action was read out, the motions led by Lord Grenville and Charles Grey, who both made expansive speeches in praise of Duckworth. Head money, a bounty on enemy servicemen killed, wounded or captured, was paid for 4,268 men, even though records showed that the French fleet carried significantly fewer men than that. Additional prize money was paid for the captured Jupiter and awards of money, ceremonial plate and ornate swords were made by patriotic societies and Lloyd's of London insurers. Admiral Louis was made a baronet and Cochrane a Knight Companion of the Order of the Bath, while a number of promotions were distributed among the first lieutenants.

Duckworth, however, received nothing beyond his share of the general rewards. Vice-admiral Lord Collingwood, commander in chief of the Mediterranean, was furious that Duckworth had deserted his post off Cádiz, failed to bring Willaumez to battle in December and then sailed for the West Indies to resupply rather than returning to the Spanish coast. Historians William James and William Laird Clowes both considered that if Duckworth had not defeated Leissègues he would probably have faced a court martial. Duckworth's absence forced Collingwood to divert some of his own ships to the Cádiz blockade. The force provided still proved inadequate – on 26 February a French frigate squadron broke out of the port and escaped to Rochefort. Collingwood's influence was enough to block additional rewards to Duckworth, who subsequently returned to the Mediterranean and in 1807 commanded the fleet at the failed Dardanelles operation. Over four decades later the battle was among the actions recognised by a clasp attached to the Naval General Service Medal, awarded upon application to all British participants still living in 1847.

In France, the government press misrepresented the battle. Le Moniteur Universel published a report purportedly written by Captain Raymond Cocault of the corvette Diligente. The report began by inaccurately claiming that the British squadron consisted of nine ships of the line. The report concluded with the information that two British ships had been destroyed on the San Domingo coast alongside three French and that two others had been dismasted and were badly damaged. The official French report, written by Leissègues but not published in France, contradicted this version of events. Leissègues stated that Cocault, with the other smaller warships, had made all sail to the westwards at the start of the engagement and that by the time the flagship drove ashore, Diligente was already out of sight. Leissègues remained on Santo Domingo for some time, but had returned to Europe by the time the colony fell to a joint British and Spanish force in July 1809. He later received a regional command in the Ionian Sea and took part in the Adriatic campaign.

The Atlantic campaign continued throughout the spring and summer. Willaumez was able to avoid the British squadrons searching for him by remaining deep in the South Atlantic. However, on 13 March 1806 the British under Warren intercepted and defeated an unrelated French squadron under Counter-admiral Charles-Alexandre Léon Durand Linois while it was returning from the Indian Ocean. Eventually forced north in search of additional food supplies, Willaumez entered the Caribbean, where he hoped to intercept the Jamaica convoy to Britain. The disobedience of one of his own captains foiled Willaumez's plan and he ordered his squadron to its final cruising ground, off Newfoundland. On 18 August 1806, while it was deep in the Central Atlantic, a ferocious hurricane caught the squadron and scattered it. Willaumez eventually found shelter in Havana; a number of his ships reached ports in the United States, some too badly damaged to ever sail again. Only four of the 11 ships of the line that left Brest in December 1805 ever returned to France. San Domingo was the last fleet battle of the Wars to be fought in open water; the only subsequent engagement between fleets was the Battle of Basque Roads, fought in the narrow, shallow waters at the mouth of the river Charente.

== Bibliography ==
- Adkins, Roy; Adkins, Lesley (2006). The War for All the Oceans. London: Abacus. ISBN 0-349-11916-3.
- Clowes, William Laird (1997) [1900]. The Royal Navy, A History from the Earliest Times to 1900, Volume V. Chatham Publishing. ISBN 1-86176-014-0.
- Gardiner, Robert, ed. (2001) [1998]. The Victory of Seapower. Caxton Editions. ISBN 1-84067-359-1.
- Grocott, Terence (2002) [1997]. Shipwrecks of the Revolutionary & Napoleonic Era. Caxton Editions. ISBN 1-84067-164-5.
- Hannah, P (2021). Keats, A Treasure to the Service. Green Hill. ISBN 978-1-922629-73-9.
- James, William (2002) [1827]. The Naval History of Great Britain, Volume 4, 1805–1807. Conway Maritime Press. ISBN 0-85177-908-5.
- Rodger, N.A.M. (2004). The Command of the Ocean. Allan Lane. ISBN 0-7139-9411-8.
- Rose, J. Holland (1929). "British West India Commerce as a Factor in the Napoleonic War". Cambridge Historical Journal. 3 (1): 34–46. doi:10.1017/S1474691300002092. OCLC 48537238.
- Woodman, Richard (2001). The Sea Warriors. Constable Publishers. ISBN 1-84119-183-3.
