= Sir John Duckworth, 1st Baronet =

Royal Navy officer, colonial administrator and politician (1748–1817)

Admiral of the Blue Sir John Duckworth Bt GCB
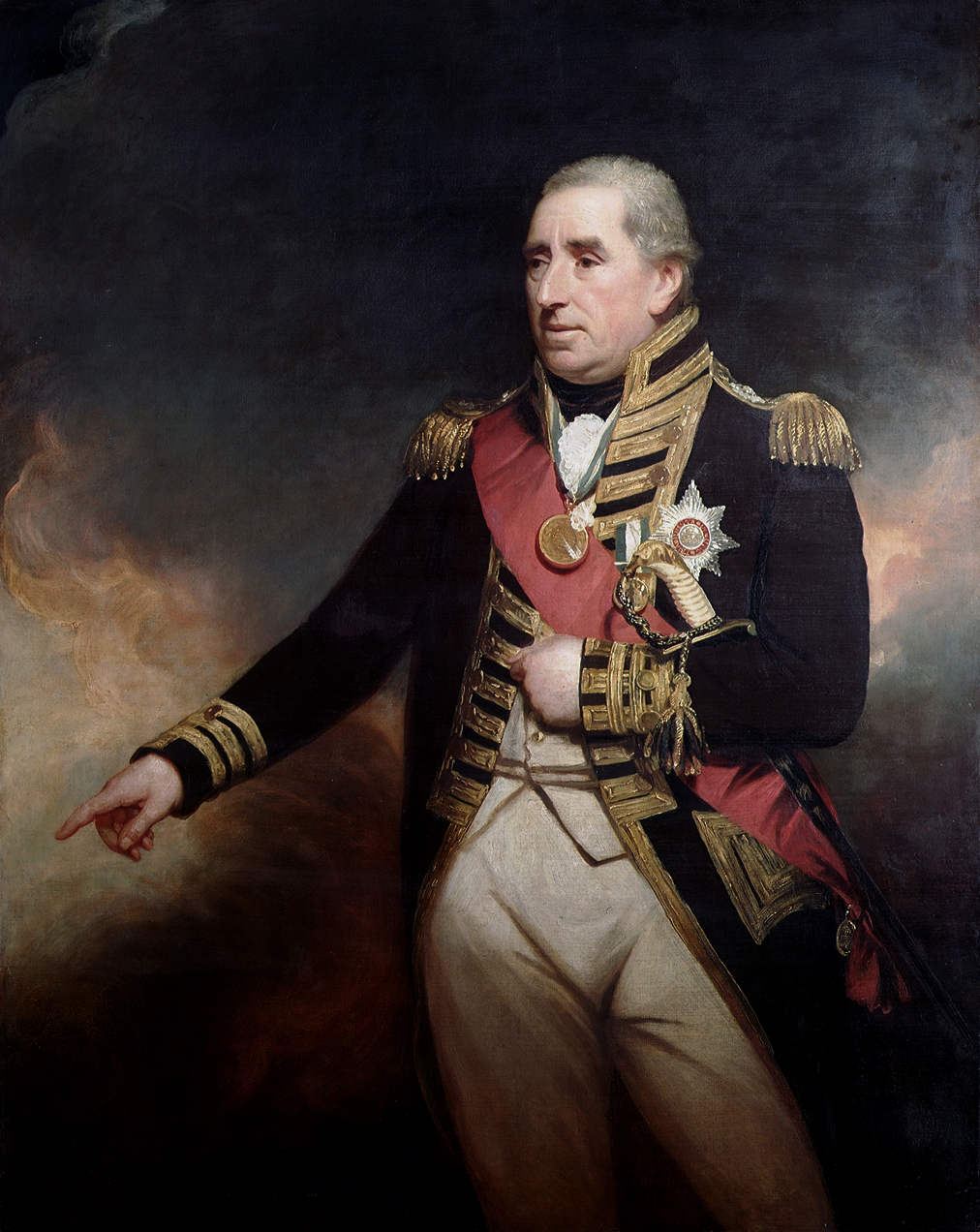
- Portrait by Sir William Beechey, 1810

Governor of Newfoundland
- In office 1810–1812
- Preceded by: John Holloway
- Succeeded by: Sir Richard Keats

Member of Parliament for New Romney
- In office 1812–1817 Serving with William Mitford
- Preceded by: The Earl of Clonmell; George Ashburnham
- Succeeded by: Cholmeley Dering; William Mitford
- Military career
- Born: 9 February 1748; Leatherhead, Surrey
- Died: 31 August 1817 (aged 69); HMNB Devonport, England
- Allegiance: Great Britain; United Kingdom
- Branch: Royal Navy
- Service years: 1759–1817
- Rank: Admiral of the Blue
- Commands: HMS Rover; HMS Terrible; HMS Yarmouth; HMS Bristol; HMS Bombay Castle; HMS Princess Royal; HMS Orion; HMS Leviathan; Leeward Islands Station; Jamaica Station; Newfoundland Station; Mediterranean Fleet; Governor of Newfoundland; Plymouth Command
- Conflicts: Seven Years' War; Battle of Quiberon Bay; American War of Independence; Battle of Grenada; French Revolutionary Wars; Glorious First of June; Assault on Cádiz (1797); Capture of Minorca; Capture of St. Bartholomew and St. Martin; Ferrol Expedition; Napoleonic Wars; Atlantic campaign of 1806; Battle of San Domingo; Dardanelles operation; Alexandria expedition of 1807; Haitian Revolution; War of 1812
- Awards: Naval Gold Medal; Knight Grand Cross of the Order of the Bath; Swords of Honour from London and Jamaica

Viceregal styles of Sir John Duckworth
- Reference style: His Excellency
- Spoken style: Your Excellency

Admiral of the Blue Sir John Thomas Duckworth, 1st Baronet, GCB (9 February 1748 – 31 August 1817) was a Royal Navy officer, colonial administrator and politician who served in the Seven Years' War, American War of Independence, French Revolutionary and Napoleonic Wars and War of 1812. In addition to serving as the governor of Newfoundland, he was also a member of the British House of Commons during his semi-retirement. Duckworth, a vicar's son, achieved much in a naval career that began at the age of 11.

Serving with most of the great names of the Royal Navy during the later 18th and early 19th centuries, he fought almost all of Britain's enemies on the seas at one time or another, including a Dardanelles operation that would be remembered a century later during the First World War. He was in command at the Battle of San Domingo, the last major battle fought between British and French ships of the line in open water during the French Revolutionary and Napoleonic Wars.

== Early life ==
Born in Leatherhead, Surrey, England, Duckworth was one of five sons of Sarah Johnson and the vicar Henry Duckworth A.M. of Stoke Poges, County of Buckinghamshire. The Duckworths were descended from a landed family, with Henry later being installed as Canon of Windsor. John Duckworth briefly attended Eton College, but began his naval career in 1759 at the suggestion of Edward Boscawen, when he entered the Royal Navy as a midshipman on HMS Namur. Namur later became part of the fleet under Sir Edward Hawke, and Duckworth was present at the Battle of Quiberon Bay on 20 November 1759.

On 5 April 1764, he joined the 50-gun HMS Guernsey at Chatham, after leaving HMS Prince of Orange, to serve with Admiral Hugh Palliser, then Governor of Newfoundland. He served aboard HMS Princess Royal, on which he suffered a concussion when he was hit by the head of another sailor, decapitated by a cannonball. He spent some months as an acting lieutenant, and was confirmed in the rank on 14 November 1771. He then spent three years aboard the 74-gun HMS Kent, the Plymouth guardship, under Captain Charles Fielding. Fielding was given command of the frigate HMS Diamond in early 1776, and he took Duckworth with him as his first lieutenant.

Duckworth married Anne Wallis in July 1776, with whom he had a son and a daughter.

After some time in North America, where Duckworth was acquitted by court-martial for negligence after an accident at Rhode Island on 18 January 1777 left five men dead, the Diamond was sent to join Vice-Admiral John Byron's fleet in the West Indies. Byron transferred him to his own ship, HMS Princess Royal, in March 1779, and Duckworth was present aboard her at the Battle of Grenada on 6 July 1779. Duckworth was promoted to commander ten days after this and given command of the sloop-of-war HMS Rover (1779).

After cruising off Martinique for a time, he was promoted to post captain on 16 June 1780 and given command of the 74-gun HMS Terrible. He returned to the Princess Royal as flag-captain to Rear-Admiral Sir Joshua Rowley, with whom he went to Jamaica. He was briefly in command of HMS Yarmouth, before moving into HMS Bristol in February 1781, and returned to England with a trade convoy. In the years of peace before the French Revolution he was a captain of the 74-gun HMS Bombay Castle, lying at Plymouth.

== Revolutionary wars service ==
Fighting against France, Duckworth distinguished himself both in European waters and in the Caribbean. He was initially in command of the 74-gun HMS Orion from 1793 and served in the Channel Fleet under Admiral Lord Howe. He was in action at the Glorious First of June. Duckworth was one of few commanders specifically mentioned by Howe for their good conduct, and one of eighteen commanders honoured with the Naval Gold Medal, and the thanks of both Houses of Parliament.

He was appointed to command the 74-gun HMS Leviathan in early 1794, and went out to the West Indies where he served under Rear-Admiral Sir William Parker. He was appointed commodore at Santo Domingo in August 1796. In 1798 Duckworth was in command of a small squadron of four vessels.^{[a]} He sailed for Minorca on 19 October 1798, where he was a joint commander with Sir Charles Stuart, initially landing his 800 troops in the bay of Addaya, and later landing sailors and marines from his ships, which included HMS Cormorant and HMS Aurora, to support the Army. He was promoted to Rear-Admiral of the White on 14 February 1799 following Minorca's capture, and "Minorca" was later inscribed on his coat of arms. In June his squadron of four ships captured Courageux.

In April 1800 was in command of the blockading squadron off Cádiz, and intercepted a large and rich Spanish convoy from Lima off Cádiz, consisting of two frigates (both taken as prizes) and eleven merchant vessels, with his share of the prize money estimated at £75,000. In June 1800 he sailed to take up his post as the newly appointed Commander-in-Chief at Barbados and the Leeward Islands Station, succeeding Lord Hugh Seymour.

Duckworth was nominated a Knight Companion of the most Honourable Military Order of the Bath in 1801 (and installed in 1803), for the capture of the islands of St. Bartholomew, St. Martin, St. Thomas, St. John and St. Croix and defeat of the Swedish and Danish forces stationed there on 20 March 1801.

Lieutenant-General Thomas Trigge commanded the ground troops, which consisted of two brigades under Brigadier-Generals Fuller and Frederick Maitland, of 1,500 and 1,800 troops respectively. These included the 64th Regiment of Foot (Lieutenant-Colonel Edward Pakenham), and the 2nd and 8th West Indies Regiments, two detachments of Royal Artillery, and two companies of sailors, each of about 100 men. The ships involved, in addition to Leviathan, included HMS Andromeda, HMS Unite, HMS Coromandel, HMS Proselyte, HMS Amphitrite, HMS Hornet, the brig HMS Drake, hired armed brig Fanny, schooner HMS Eclair, and tender Alexandria.

Aside from the territory and prisoners taken during the operation, Duckworth's force took two Swedish merchantmen, a Danish ship (in ballast), three small French vessels, one privateer brig (12-guns), one captured English ship, a merchant-brig, four small schooners, and a sloop.

== Service against Napoleon ==
=== West Indies ===
From 1803 until 1804, Duckworth assumed command as the commander-in-chief of the Jamaica Station, during which time he directed the operations which led to the surrender of General Rochambeau and the French army, following the successful Blockade of Saint-Domingue. Duckworth was promoted to Vice-Admiral of the Blue on 23 April 1804, and he was appointed a Colonel of Marines. He succeeded in capturing numerous enemy vessels and 5,512 French prisoners of war. In recognition of his service, the Legislative Assembly of Jamaica presented Duckworth with a ceremonial sword and a gold scabbard, inscribed with a message of thanks.^{[b]} The merchants of Kingston provided a second gift, an ornamental tea kettle signifying Duckworth's defence of sugar and tea exports. Both sword and kettle were subsequently gifted to the National Maritime Museum in Greenwich.

Duckworth remained in Jamaica until 1805, returning to England that April aboard HMS Acasta. On his return to England again, he was called to face court-martial charges brought by Captain James Athol Wood of HMS Acasta, who claimed that Duckworth had transgressed the 18th Article of War; "Taking goods onboard other than for the use of the vessel, except gold & etc." Duckworth had apparently acquired some goods, and in wishing to transport them home in person reassigned Captain Wood to another vessel on Jamaica station knowing that the vessel was soon to be taken under command by another flag officer. Consequently, Duckworth was able to take the goods to England as personal luggage, and Wood was forced to sail back as a passenger on his own ship. The court-martial was held on board HMS Gladiator in Portsmouth on 25 April 1805, but the charge was dropped on 7 June 1805.

=== Atlantic ===
In 1805 the British Admiralty decided that Duckworth should raise his flag aboard HMS Royal George and sail to join Vice-Admiral Horatio Nelson off Cádiz as third in command. However, the Plymouth Dockyards could not make Royal George ready to sail in time, and Duckworth was directed to raise his flag in HMS Superb, with Captain Richard Keats as his flag-captain. Keats was to have been Nelson's second. The Superb was exiting the Channel when she intercepted the Pickle carrying news of the victory and of Nelson's death and did not arrive off Cádiz until well after the battle. On the basis of the writings of ships boy Edward Trelawney some have said the delay was due to Duckworth's refusal to sail from Portsmouth until his favourite musicians had arrived from another ship. Correspondence between Duckworth and the Admiralty confirms his upset at being required to sail ‘without his comforts’, but that his final orders were not issued until 28 October when Superb had finally been released from the docks after an urgent refit. They did not arrive off Cádiz until 15 November, after the Battle of Trafalgar had been fought. Duckworth was then ordered to take command of the West Indies squadron involved in the blockade of Cádiz, with seven sail of the line, consisting of five 74-gun ships, the 80-gun HMS Canopus and the 64-gun HMS Agamemnon, and two frigates.

Although known for a cautious character, he abandoned the blockade and sailed in search of a French squadron under Admiral Zacharie Allemand, which had been reported by a frigate off Madeira on 30 November, on his own initiative. While searching for the French, which eventually eluded him, he came across another French squadron on 25 December, consisting of six sail of the line and a frigate. This was the squadron under Contre-Admiral Jean-Baptiste Willaumez, heading for the Cape of Good Hope, and pursued by Rear-Admiral Sir Richard Strachan. Duckworth gave chase and came within seven miles of the enemy, but at that point his ships being well separated, to the dismay and disappointment of the men, he decided not to risk engaging and abandoned the pursuit.

== Return to the West Indies ==
Duckworth then set sail for the Leeward Islands to take on water, dispatching the 74-gun HMS Powerful to reinforce the East Indies squadron. There, at Saint Kitts, he was joined on 21 January 1806 by the 74-gun ships HMS Northumberland and HMS Atlas commanded by Sir Alexander Cochrane, and on 1 February a brig Kingfisher commanded by Nathaniel Day Cochrane, which brought news of French at San Domingo.^{[c]} The French had a squadron of five ships: the 120-gun Imperial, two 84-gun and two 74-gun ships and two frigates, under the command of Counter-admiral Corentin Urbain Leissègues which escaped from Brest and sought to reinforce the French forces at San Domingo with about 1,000 troops. Arriving at San Domingo on 6 February 1806, Duckworth found the French squadron with its transports anchored in the Occa bay. The French commander immediately hurried to sea, forming a line of battle as they went. Duckworth gave the signal to form two columns of four and three ships of the line.

=== Battle of San Domingo ===
1808 painting of the Battle of San Domingo

In the Battle of San Domingo, Duckworth's squadron defeated the squadron of French when

Duckworth at once made the signal to attack. Keats and his crew having accompanied Nelson in the pursuit of Villeneuve to the West Indies were still lamenting having missed Trafalgar. Keats silently suspended a portrait of Nelson from the mizzen stay before addressing the men in a manner intended to encourage enthusiasm for the cause in the coming battle. With the band playing ‘God save the King’ and ‘Nelson of the Nile’ the Superb having made up all ground on the fleeing enemy fired her starboard broadside as she was laid up against the Imperiale, the largest ship in the French navy. The conflict soon became general. In a severe action of two hours, two of the French ships were driven ashore and burnt with three others captured. Only the French frigates escaped.

Despite this, it is thought that Duckworth was lucky to have with him captains who were used to working together instinctively and who consistent with the Nelson approach, had no need to wait for any central direction from the Admiral and the credit for the victory was due more to the initiative of the individual British captains. Duckworth's victory over Leissègues' squadron was a fatal blow to France's military efforts in the West Indies and played a major part in the ultimate British victory in the Caribbean campaign of 1803–1810. It was judged sufficiently important to have the Tower of London guns fire a salute. San Domingo was added to Duckworth's coat of arms as words; a British sailor was added to the supporters of the Arms in 1814.

Annuity to Admiral Duckworth Act 1806
- Act of Parliament
- Parliament of the United Kingdom
- Long title: An Act to enable his Majesty to grant a certain annuity to vice-admiral Sir John Thomas Duckworth, knight of the most honourable Order of the Bath, in consideration of the eminent services which he has rendered to his Majesty and the publick.
- Citation: 46 Geo. 3. c. 40
- Territorial extent: United Kingdom

Dates
- Royal assent: 5 May 1806
- Commencement: 5 May 1806 (Note: The Acts of Parliament (Commencement) Act 1793.)
- Repealed: 6 August 1872
Other legislation
Repealed by	Statute Law Revision Act 1872

Status: Repealed

Text of statute as originally enacted

A promotion to Vice-Admiral of the White in April 1806 followed,^{[d]} along with the presentation of a sword of honour by the House of Assembly of Jamaica, while his naval feats were acknowledged with several honours, including a sword of honour by the corporation of the City of London.^{[e]} A great dinner was also held in his honour as the Mansion House. On his return to England, Duckworth was granted a substantial pension of £1,000 by an act of Parliament, and the freedom of the city of London.

Santo Domingo was the last major battle fought between British and French ships of the line in open water during the French Revolutionary and Napoleonic Wars. Despite negative claims made about his personality, the battle displayed Duckworth's understanding of the role of naval strategy in the overall war by securing for Britain mastery of the sea, and thus having sea-oriented mentality having placed a British fleet in the right strategic position. Duckworth also displayed the willingness of accept changing tactics employed by Nelson, and maintained the superiority of British naval gunnery in battle. It was, however, widely thought that but for this graphic demonstration of British sea-power and significant victory he may well have faced a court martial for having abandoned his post off Cádiz without orders to do so.

=== Mediterranean ===
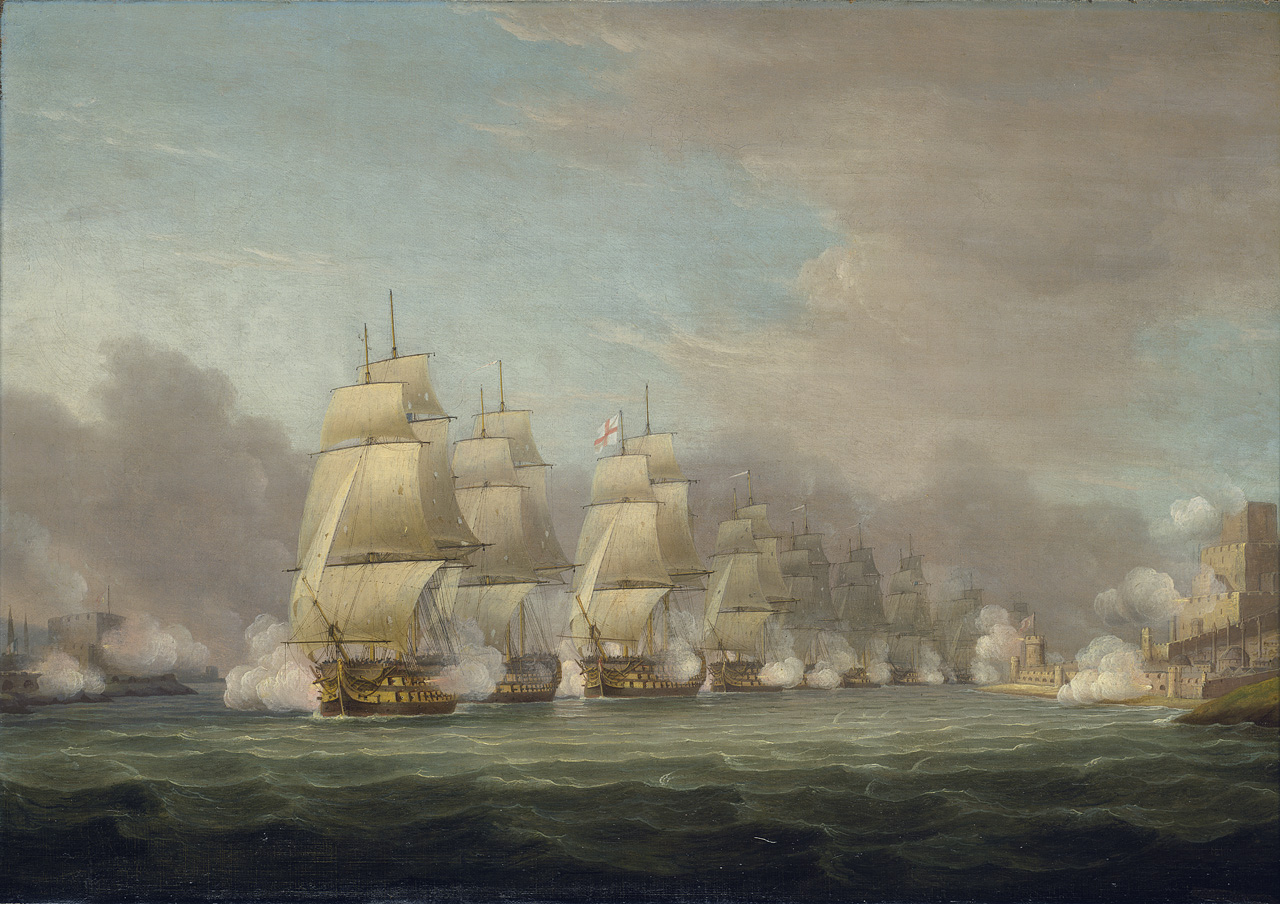
Duckworth's squadron forcing the Dardanelles, by Thomas Whitcombe

Duckworth was appointed second in command of the Mediterranean Fleet in 1805 primarily on consideration by the Admiralty of having a senior officer in the forthcoming operations with the Imperial Russian Navy. Sailing in the 100-gun first-rate HMS Royal George with eight ships of the line and four smaller vessels, he arrived at the island of Tenedos with orders to take possession of the Ottoman fleet at Constantinople, thus supporting Dmitry Senyavin's fleet in the Dardanelles operation. Accompanying him were some of the ablest Royal Navy officers such as Sidney Smith, Richard Dacres and Henry Blackwood but he was in doubt of having the capability to breach the shore batteries and reach the anchored Ottoman fleet. Aware of Turkish efforts to reinforce the shore artillery, he nevertheless took no action until 11 February 1807 and spent some time in the strait waiting for a favourable wind. In the evening of the same day Blackwood's ship, HMS Ajax accidentally caught fire while at anchor off Tenedos, and was destroyed, although her captain and most of the crew were saved and redistributed among the fleet.

Finally, on 19 February, at the action at Point Pisquies (Nagara Burun), a part of the British force encountered the Ottoman fleet which engaged first. One 64-gun ship of the line, four 36-gun frigates, five 12-gun corvettes, one 8-gun brig, and a gunboat were forced ashore and burnt by the part of the British fleet.

The British fleet consisted of HMS Standard, under Captain Thomas Harvey, HMS Thunderer, under Captain John Talbot, HMS Pompee, under flag captain Richard Dacres, and HMS Repulse, under Captain Arthur Kaye Legge, as well as the frigate HMS Active, under Captain Richard Hussey Mowbray, under the command of Rear-admiral Sir Sidney Smith, commanding the rear division. They took one corvette and one gunboat, and the flags of the Ottoman Vice-admiral and Captain Pasha in the process, with adjacent fortifications destroyed by landing parties from HMS Thunderer, HMS Pompée, and HMS Repulse, while its 31 guns were spiked by the marines. The marines were commanded by Captain Nicholls of HMS Standard who had also boarded the Turkish ship of the line. There were eight 32 lb and 24 lb brass guns and the rest firing marble shot weighing upwards of 200 pounds.

On 20 February, the British squadron under Duckworth, having joined Smith with the second division of ships under command of Rear-admiral Sir Thomas Louis, reached the Ottoman capital, but had to engage in fruitless negotiations with the Sultan's representatives, advised by Napoleon's ambassador Sébastiani, and with the accompanying British ambassador Charles Arbuthnot and Russian plenipotentiary Andrey Italinski, the latter being carried aboard on HMS Endymion, under the command of Captain Thomas Bladen Capel, due to the secret instructions that were issued as part of his orders for the mission, and therefore losing more time as the Turks played for time to complete their shore batteries in the hope of trapping the British squadron.

Smith was joined a week later by Duckworth, who observed the four bays of the Dardanelles lined with five hundred cannon and one hundred mortars as his ships passed towards Constantinople. There he found the rest of the Turkish fleet of twelve ships of the line and nine frigates,^{[f]} all apparently ready for action in Constantinople harbour. Exasperated by Turkish intransigence, and not having a significant force to land on the shore, Duckworth decided to withdraw on 1 March after declining to take Smith's advice to bombard the Turkish Arsenal and gunpowder manufacturing works. The British fleet was subjected to shore artillery fire all the way to the open sea, and sustaining casualties and damage to ships from 26-inch calibre (650 mm) guns firing 300–800 pound marble shot.

Though blamed for indecisiveness, notably by Thomas Grenville, the First Lord of the Admiralty, Duckworth announced that

I must, as an officer, declare to be my decided opinion that, without the cooperation of a body of land forces, it would be a wanton sacrifice of the squadrons to attempt to force the passage

After his departure from Constantinople, he commanded the squadron protecting transports of the Alexandria expedition of 1807, but that was forced to withdraw after five months due to lack of supplies. Duckworth summed up this expedition, in reflection on the service of the year by commenting that

Instead of acting vigorously in either one or the other direction, our cabinet comes to the miserable determination of sending five or six men-of-war, without soldiers, to the Dardanelles, and 5000 soldiers, without a fleet, to Alexandria.

Soon after, he married again, on 14 May 1808 to Susannah Catherine Buller, a daughter of William Buller, the Bishop of Exeter. They had two sons together before his death, she survived him, dying on 27 April 1840.

== The Channel Fleet ==
Duckworth's career however did not suffer greatly, and in 1808 and 1810 he went on to sail in HMS San Josef and HMS Hibernia, some of the largest first-rates in the Royal Navy, as commander of the Channel Fleet, In the summer of 1809 he served on the panel of judges at the Court-martial of James, Lord Gambier which assessed whether Admiral Lord Gambier had failed to support Captain Lord Cochrane at the Battle of Basque Roads in April 1809. Gambier was controversially cleared of all charges.

== Newfoundland and War of 1812 ==
Probably because he was thought of as irresolute and unimaginative, on 26 March 1810 Duckworth was appointed Governor of Newfoundland and Commander-in-Chief of the Newfoundland Station's three frigates and eight smaller vessels. Although this was a minor command in a remote station spanning from Davis Strait to the Gulf of St Lawrence, he also received a promotion to Admiral of the Blue, flying his flag aboard the 50-gun HMS Antelope.

While serving as Governor he was attacked for his arbitrary powers over the territory, and retaliated against the pamphleteer by disallowing his reappointment as surgeon of the local militia unit, the Loyal Volunteers of St John, which Duckworth, renamed the St John's Volunteer Rangers, and enlarged to 500 officers and militiamen for the War of 1812 with the United States.

Duckworth also took an interest in bettering relationship with the local Beothuk Indians, and sponsored Lieutenant David Buchan's expedition up the Exploits River in 1810 to explore the region of the Beothuk settlements.

As the governor and station naval commander, Duckworth had to contend with American concerns over the issues of "Free Trade and Sailor's Rights." His orders and instructions to captains under his command were therefore directly concerned with fishing rights of US vessels on the Grand Banks, the prohibition of United States trade with British colonials, the searching of ships under US flag for contraband, and the impressment of seamen for service on British vessels. He returned to Portsmouth on 28 November in HMS Antelope after escorting transports from Newfoundland.

== Semi-retirement ==
On 2 December 1812, soon after arriving in Devon, Duckworth resigned as governor after being offered a parliamentary seat for New Romney on the coast of Kent. At about this time he found out that his oldest son George Henry had been killed in action while serving in the rank of a Colonel with the Duke of Wellington, during the Peninsular War. George Henry had been killed at the Battle of Albuera at the head of the 48th (Northamptonshire) Regiment of Foot.

Sir John was created a baronet on 2 November 1813, adopting a motto Disciplina, fide, perseverantia (Discipline, fidelity, perseverance), and in January 1815 was appointed Commander-in-Chief, Plymouth 45 miles from his home; a post considered one of semi-retirement by his successor, Lord Exmouth. However, on 26 June that year it became a centre of attention due to the visit by HMS Bellerophon bearing Napoleon to his final exile, with Duckworth being the last senior British officer to speak with him before his departure on board HMS Northumberland.

Duckworth died at his post on the base in 1817 at 1 o'clock, after several months of illness; after a long and distinguished service with the Royal Navy. He was buried on 9 September at the church in Topsham, where he was laid to rest in the family vault, with his coffin covered with crimson velvet studded with 2,500 silvered nails to resemble a ship's planking.

== Memorials ==
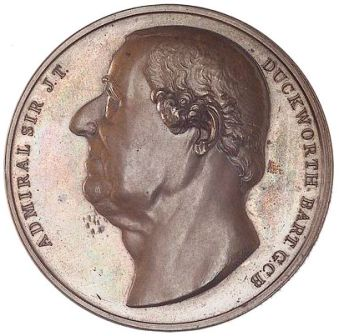
Duckworth depicted in his last year on a commemorative medal minted by his friends.

When in England for winters during his term as Governor of Newfoundland, Duckworth lived on a property called Weare House of Weare Park in Topsham, Devon.^{[g]} He had purchased the house in 1804 and rebuilt over several years. His property, and half of the golf course that the Exeter Golf and Country Club now occupies, was the largest US Navy Supply Depot in the south of England during the Second World War, with some later retained for use by a UK MOD Naval Store.

During the Second World War one Royal Navy warship, the destroyer HMS Duckworth was named after the Admiral.

In England, The Duckworth House is in Kent St, Portsmouth PO1 to be found not far from the Portsmouth Historic Dockyard complex.

The memorial to Admiral John Thomas Duckworth in the south transept of St Margaret's Church, Topsham, was erected by his wife, Susannah née Buller, daughter of William Buller, Bishop of Exeter. The memorial describes him as Admiral of the White Squadron of his Majesty's Fleet and depicts a naval scene which, by comparison with artworks on the same theme, represents his famous passage through the Dardanelles in 1807. The sculptor, Sir Francis Chantrey (1781 – 1841), is regarded as the foremost portrait sculptor of his generation. The adjacent memorial, also by Chantrey, is to the Admiral's son Colonel George Duckworth who died in action at Albuera in 1811. It depicts a soldier and an angel.

Duckworth Street in St. John's, Newfoundland and Labrador, is named in his honour.

== Archives ==
The Beinecke Rare Book & Manuscript Library at Yale University holds the Sir John Thomas Duckworth papers (1739-1908), containing correspondence, letter books, printed material, artwork, commemorative medals, and other papers by or relating to British Admiral Sir John Thomas Duckworth. The materials are open for research.

== Notes ==
a. Some accounts mention only Leviathan, HMS Swiftsure, and HMS Emerald.

b. The sword was forged by Richard Teed (1756–1816) of Lancaster Court, London, and carried the inscription: Presented in 1804 by the Assembly of Jamaica to Vice Admiral Sir I.T. Duckworth in remembrance of his effectual protection afforded to the commerce and coasts of the island. By his able disinterested distribution of H.M. Naval Forces under his command & as a testimony of the high sense entertained by the Assembly of the eminent service he has thereby rendered to that country."

c. Brenton records a story of amazingly lucky wind changes that allowed this news to be delivered to Duckworth within two days.

d. The Naval Chronicle gives 9 November 1805.

e. Richard Teed was responsible for the manufacture and supply of the swords presented by the Lloyd's Patriotic Fund to deserving sailors and soldiers during the Napoleonic Wars, 1803–14; the sword is now part of the sword collection of the National Maritime Museum, Greenwich.

f. Miller (p. 311) reports "twelve ships of the line and nine frigates", but Howard (p. 37) gives "twelve ships of the line, two of them three-deckers, and nine frigates filled with troops"

g. The new spelling is Wear, in Countess Wear on the outskirts of Exeter.

== Bibliography ==
- Allen, Joseph, Esq. R.N., New Navy Lists and General Record of Services of Officers of the Royal Navy and Royal Marines, Greenwich Hospital, Parker, Furnivall and Parker, Military Library, Whitehall, London, 1850
- Anderson, William, The Scottish Nation: Or The Surnames, Families, Literature, Honours, and Biographical History of the People of Scotland, Fullarton, 1862
- Barham (Lord), Charles Middleton, Letters and Papers of Charles, Lord Barham, Admiral of the Red Squadron: 1758–1813, Volume III Adamant Media Corporation, 2004
- Brenton, Edward Pelham, The Naval History of Great Britain, from the Year MDCCLXXXIII. to MDCCCXXXVI.: From the Year MDCCLXXXIII. to MDCCCXXXVI, Volume II, Henry Colburn Publisher, London 1837
- Bisset, Robert, The History of the Reign of George III.: To which is Prefixed, A View of the Progressive Improvement of England, in Prosperity and Strength, to the Accession of His Majesty ..., Volumes II–III, E. Littell, London, 1828
- Burke, John, A General and Heraldic Dictionary of the Peerage and Baronetage of the British Empire, Vol. II, 5th edition, Published by H. Colburn and R. Bentley, London, 1832
- Cates, William Leist Readwin, A Dictionary of General Biography: With a Classified and Chronological Index of the Principal Names, Longmans, Green & Co., London, 1867
- Chatterton, E. Keble, Dardanelles Dilemma; The Story of the Naval Operations, Rich & Cowan, Ltd., London, 1935
- Clarke, The Georgian Era: Memoirs of the Most Eminent Persons, who Have Flourished in Great Britain, from the Accession of George the First to the Demise of George the Fourth, Vizetelly, Branston and Co., London, 1833
- Cundall, Frank (1915). Historic Jamaica. West India Committee.
- Debrett, John, (Ed.), The Peerage of the United Kingdom of Great Britain and Ireland in two volumes, Volume Two, Scotland and Ireland, Thirteenth edition, London, 1820
- Debrett, John, Debrett's baronetage of England revised, corrected and continued by George William Collen, William Pickering Publisher, London 1840
- Hannah, P., Keats, A Treasure to the Service, Green Hill, Adelaide, 2021, ISBN 978-1922629739
- Higgins, Trumbull, Winston Churchill and the Dardanelles; A Dialogue in Ends and Means, McMillan, London, 1963.
- Howard, Edward, Memoires of Admiral Sir Sidney Smith, K.C. B., & c., Volume 2, Adamant Media Corporation, 2003
- Ireland, Bernard, Naval Warfare in the Age of Sail: War at Sea 1756–1815, Collins, 2001
- James, William M., A Naval History of Great Britain: During the French Revolutionary and Napoleonic Wars, Vol. 3: 1800–1805, Stackpole Books, 2002
- James, William & Chamier, Frederick, The Naval History of Great Britain: From the Declaration of War by France in 1793 to the Accession of George IV, volume IV, R. Bentley, 1837
- Knight, Charles, Popular History of England: An Illustrated History of Society and Government from the Earliest Period to Our Own Times, Volume VII, Bradbury and Evans, London, 1861
- Lysons, Daniel and Samuel, General history: Baronets, Magna Britannia: volume 6, Devonshire, 1822
- McAleer, John (February 2009). ""Eminent Service": War, Slavery and the Politics of Public Recognition in the British Caribbean and the Cape of Good Hope, c. 1782–1807". The Mariner's Mirror. 95 (1). Portsmouth, United Kingdom: The Society for Nautical Research: 33–51. doi:10.1080/00253359.2009.10657082. S2CID 154396622.
- Miller, Nathan, Broadsides: The Age of Fighting Sail, 1775–1815, Wiley, 2001
- Mostert, Noel, The line upon a wind: an intimate history of the last and greatest war fought at sea under sail, 1793-1815, Jonathan Cape, London, 2007
- Nelson, Horatio, Lord Viscount, The Dispatches and Letters of Vice Admiral Lord Viscount Nelson: With Notes by Sir Nicholas Harris Nicolas G.C.M.G., The Fifth Volume, January 1802 to April 1804, Henry Colburn, London, 1845
- Osler, Edward, The Life of Admiral Viscount Exmouth, BiblioBazaar, 2007
- Phillips, Richard, (ed.), The Monthly Magazine, Volume XI, Part I, January to June, London, 1801
- Ross, Sir John, Memoirs and Correspondence of Admiral Lord De Saumarez: From original papers in possession of the family, Volume 1, Adamant Media Corporation, 2001
- Sconce, Robert Clement, Life and Letters of R. C. Sconce, formerly Secretary to Admiral Sir John Duckworth, Compiled by Sarah S. Bunbury. in two volumes, Cox & Wyman, London, 1861
- Stanier Clarke, James, Jones, Stephen & Jones, John, The Naval Chronicle for 1805 containing a general and biographical history of the Royal Navy of the United Kingdom, Volume the fourteenth (from July to December), Published by I.Gold, London, 1805
- Stephens, Alexander, Public Characters of 1807, volume IX, R. Phillips, by T. Gillet, 1807
- Watts, Sir Percy, The Ships of the Royal Navy as they existed at the time of Trafalgar, Read to the Institution of Naval Architects, 19 July 1905
- Wegener, Edward, H. Wegener (Translator), The Soviet Naval Offensive, Naval Institute Press, 1976
- Whiteley, William H., Duckworth, Sir John Thomas, Dictionary of Canadian Biography online, http://www.biographi.ca/009004-119.01-e.php?&id_nbr=2380

Military offices
Preceded by Lord Hugh Seymour	Commander-in-Chief, Leeward Islands Station; 1800–1801	Succeeded by Thomas Totty
Preceded by Robert Montagu	Commander-in-Chief, Jamaica Station; 1803–1804	Succeeded by James Richard Dacres
Political offices
Preceded by John Holloway	Commodore Governor of Newfoundland; 1810–1812	Succeeded by Sir Richard Goodwin Keats
Parliament of the United Kingdom
Preceded by The Earl of Clonmell; Hon. George Ashburnham	Member for New Romney; 1812–1817; With: William Mitford	Succeeded by William Mitford; Cholmeley Dering
Military offices
Preceded by Sir William Domett	Commander-in-Chief, Plymouth; 1815–1817	Succeeded by Viscount Exmouth
Baronetage of the United Kingdom
New creation	Baronet (of Topsham); 1813–1817	Succeeded by John Thomas Buller Duckworth
