= Corentin Urbain de Leissègues =

French Navy officer (1758–1832)

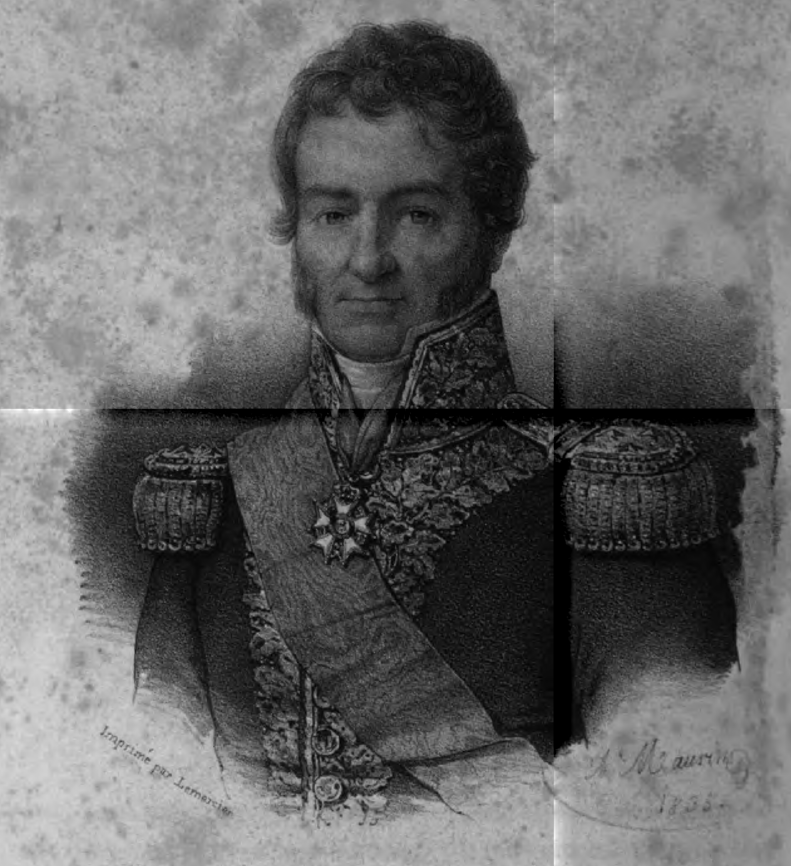
1835 portrait of Leissègues by Antoine Maurin

Vice-Admiral Corentin Urbain de Leissègues (29 August 1758 – 26 March 1832) was a French Navy officer who served in the French Revolutionary and Napoleonic Wars. He is best known for commanding the French fleet which was defeated at the Battle of San Domingo in 1806.

== Early life ==
Corentin Urbain de Leissègues was born on 29 August 1758. He joined the French Navy in 1778 at the age of 20, serving on the frigate Oiseau and participating in her patrols in the English Channel, before being transferred to Nymphe. In 1780, he was promoted to frigate lieutenant and joined the crew of Magicienne. In 1781, Leissègues joined the fleet of Vice-admiral Pierre André de Suffren, which was sent to the Indian Ocean and fought five fleet actions with the Royal Navy. Leissègues received a wound at the head during the Battle of Providien. In 1785, he began serving in the North Sea on the frigate Vigilante. Promoted to sub-ship-of-the-line lieutenant, he served in the Indian Ocean aboard the frigate Méduse from 1787 to 1791. He took his first command with the brig Furet, off Newfoundland.

== French Revolutionary Wars ==
Leissègues was promoted to ship-of-the-line captain in early 1793 and subsequently placed in command of a convoy bound for the Windward Islands. Arriving at the French colony of Guadeloupe in 1794, he found the island under British control, and participated in the French campaign to recapture it, which successfully concluded on 10 December. Leissègues was subsequently promoted to counter admiral. Upon his return to France, Leissègues was put in charge of harbour inspection from Saint-Malo to Vlissingen. He was then given command of the harbours of Ostend, Vlissingen, and Antwerp, as well of the naval forces stationed near Walcheren. Leissègues later led a French squadron to the Barbary Coast to reduce attacks by Barbary corsairs on French shipping. He obtained assurances from the rulers of Algiers and Tunis that they would not attack French ships, and brought back gifts and the ambassador of Tunis to Paris. In the same years, he transported General Guillaume Marie-Anne Brune to Constantinople.

== Napoleonic Wars and death ==
1808 painting of the Battle of San Domingo by Nicholas Pocock

In 1806, Leissègues led a squadron of five ships to reinforce the French colony of Santo Domingo. A British squadron under Vice-admiral John Thomas Duckworth intercepted the convoy, and destroyed it in the ensuing Battle of San Domingo. Leissègues was not captured and successfully returned to France. On 7 April 1809, Leissègues was put in charge of the defence of Venice. He was then tasked to bring supplies to Corfu, staying there until the island was surrendered to the Sixth Coalition in 1814 on the orders of Louis XVIII. Leissègues returned to Toulon in August 1814. Leissègues served under the Bourbon Restoration until 1818, rising to the rank of vice admiral. He died on 26 March 1832.

== Honours ==
- Commander of the Order of Saint Louis
- Commander of the Legion of Honour
