= HMS Atlas (1782) =

Ship of the line of the Royal Navy

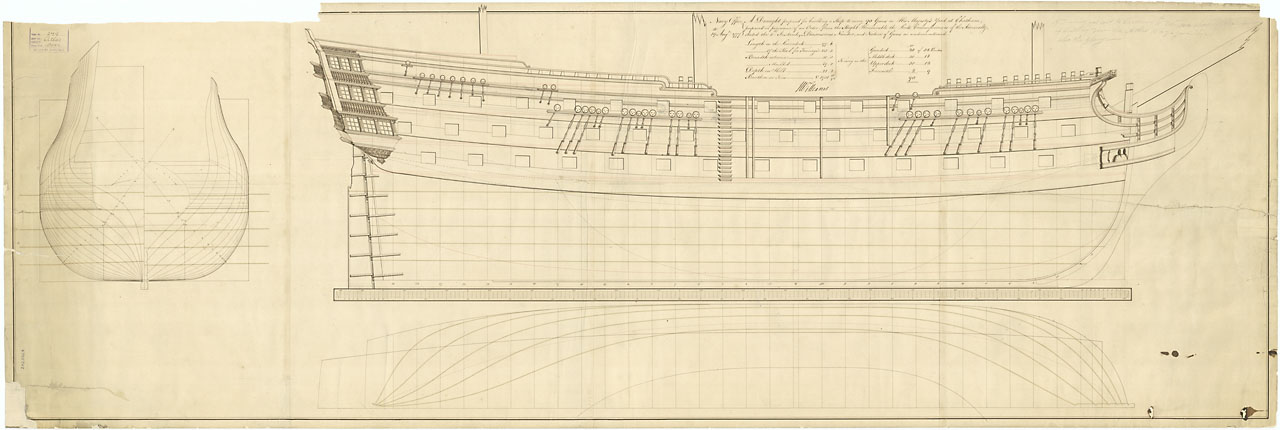
- Atlas the plan includes pencil alterations dated 1802 for cutting her down to 74-gun two-decker third rate

History

Great Britain
- Name: HMS Atlas
- Ordered: 5 August 1777
- Builder: Chatham Dockyard
- Laid down: 1 October 1777
- Launched: 13 February 1782
- Fate: Broken up, 1821

General characteristics
- Class & type: Duke-class ship of the line
- Tons burthen: 1950 bm
- Length: 177 ft 6 in (54.10 m) (gundeck)
- Beam: 50 ft (15 m)
- Depth of hold: 21 ft 2 in (6.45 m)
- Sail plan: Full-rigged ship
- Armament: 98 guns: Gundeck: 28 × 32-pounders; Middle gundeck: 30 × 18-pounders; Upper gundeck: 30 × 12-pounders; Quarterdeck: 8 × 12-pounders; Forecastle: 2 × 12-pounders

HMS Atlas was a 98-gun second-rate ship of the line of the Royal Navy, launched on 13 February 1782. She was a Duke-class ship of the line built at Chatham Dockyard by Nicholas Phillips.

== History ==
For some of the period between 1798 and 1802, she was under the command of Captain Theophilus Jones.

In 1802 she was reduced to a 74-gun ship.

In 1798, some of her crew were court-martialed for mutiny.

She participated in the naval Battle of San Domingo on 6 February 1806, when she suffered eight killed and 11 wounded. Her captain was Samuel Pym, who had joined her the year before.

In 1808, while off Cádiz and serving as the flagship of Rear Admiral Purvis, she came under fire from French batteries on many occasions. In all, she lost about 50 men killed and wounded. She was responsible for the destruction of Fort Catalina.

Atlas was fitted as a temporary prison ship at Portsmouth from 1813 to 1814. She then spent some months as a powder magazine. She was finally broken up in 1821.
