= List of ship launches in 1796 =

The list of ship launches in 1796 includes a chronological list of some ships launched in 1796.

Date	Ship	Class	Builder	Location	Country	Notes
11 January	Raven	Albatross-class sloop	William Wallis	Blackwall	Great Britain	For Royal Navy.
9 February	Shannon	Maidstone-class frigate	Thomas Pollard	Deptford Dockyard	Great Britain	For Royal Navy.
10 February	Diane	Fifth rate		Toulon	France	For French Navy.
10 February	Libre	Romaine-class frigate		Le Havre	France	For French Navy.
23 February	Cynthia	Sloop-of-war	Wells & Co.	Rotherhithe	Great Britain	For Royal Navy.
24 February	Princess Charlotte	East Indiaman	Peter Everitt Mestaer	Rotherhithe	Great Britain	For British East India Company.
24 February	Trent	Amazon-class frigate	John Tovery	Woolwich Dockyard	Great Britain	For Royal Navy.
February	Harpy	Diligence-class brig-sloop	Thomas King	Dover	Great Britain	For Royal Navy.
February	Watt	West Indiaman	Edward Grayson	Liverpool	Great Britain	For private owner.
10 March	Henry Addington	East Indiaman	Wells	Deptford	Great Britain	For British East India Company.
11 March	Comète	Romaine-class frigate		Le Havre	France	For French Navy.
23 March	Loire	Frigate		Nantes	France	For French Navy.
24 March	Glenmore	Amazon-class frigate	John Tovey	Woolwich Dockyard	Great Britain	For Royal Navy.
24 March	York	Third rate	Barnard	Deptford	Great Britain	For Royal Navy.
26 March	Clyde	Artois-class frigate	Thomas Pollard and Edward Sisson	Chatham Dockyard	Great Britain	For Royal Navy.
26 March	Tamar	Artois-class frigate	Edward Sison	Chatham Dockyard	Great Britain	For Royal Navy.
7 April	Bittern	Bittern-class sloop	Balthazar Adams	Bucklers Hard	Great Britain	For Royal Navy.
9 April	Ardent	Third rate	Pitcher	Northfleet	Great Britain	For Royal Navy.
9 April	Cyane	Bittern-class sloop	William Wyatt	Fridsbury	Great Britain	For Royal Navy.
22 April	Thames	East Indiaman	Perry, Sons & Green	Blackwall	Great Britain	For British East India Company.
23 April	Désirée	Romaine-class frigate		Dunkirk	France	For French Navy.
23 April	Monmouth	Third rate	Randall & Co.	Rotherhithe	Great Britain	For Royal Navy.
23 April	Plover	Bittern-class sloop	James Betts	Mistley	Great Britain	For Royal Navy.
23 April	Termagant	Bittern-class sloop	John Dudman	Deptford	Great Britain	For Royal Navy.
9 May	Tellicherry	Merchantman	Joshua Young	Rotherhithe	Great Britain	For John St Barbe.
23 May	Glatton	East Indiaman	John & William Wells	Rotherhithe	Great Britain	For British East India Company.
23 May	Poursuivante	Romaine-class frigate		Dunkirk	France	For French Navy.
23 May	Walmer Castle	East Indiaman	Frances Barnard	Deptford	Great Britain	For British East India Company.
24 May	Hound	Diligence-class brig-sloop	Thomas Hills	Sandwich	Great Britain	For Royal Navy.
1 June	Merlin	Merlin-class ship-sloop	John Dudman	Deptford	Great Britain	For Royal Navy.
6 June	Sir Stephen Lushington	East Indiaman	Randall, Brent & Sons	Rotherhithe	Great Britain	For British East India Company.
7 June	Volontaire	Virginie-class frigate		Bordeaux	France	For French Navy.
7 June	Wellington	Merchantman	Hugh Edwards, Jonathan Gillett and Michael Larkins	Calcutta	India	For private owner.
23 June	Bellona	Merchantman	David Glass & John Wood	Calcutta	India	For private owner.
June	Foudre	Aviso		Toulon	France	For French Navy.
5 July	Martha	Merchantman	Peter Everitt Mestaer	Rotherhithe	Great Britain	For Peter Everitt Mestaer.
7 July	Princess Mary	Merchantman	Bernard & Edward Adams	Bucklers Hard	Great Britain	For private owner.
23 July	Agincourt	Third rate	Perry	Blackwall Yard	Great Britain	For Royal Navy.
July	Beresford	Merchantman		Liverpool	Great Britain	For Messrs. Lake & Brown.
Unknown date	Pollux	Brig		Venice	Republic of Venice	For Venetian Navy.
9 August	Washington	Ship of the line	R. Dorman	Amsterdam	Batavian Republic	For Batavian Navy.
11 August	Najaden	Fifth rate	Nyholm Naval Dockyard	Copenhagen	Denmark-Norway	For Dano-Norwegian Navy.
11 August	Nymfen	Fifth rate	Nyholm Naval Dockyard	Copenhagen	Denmark-Norway	For Dano-Norwegian Navy.
24 August	Aziia	Aziia-class ship of the line	G. Ignatyev	Arkhangelsk	Russia	For Imperial Russian Navy.
5 September	Triton	Triton-class frigate	Frances Barnard	Deptford	Great Britain	For Royal Navy.
6 September	Vsevolod	Yaroslav-class ship of the line	G. Ignatyev	Arkhangelsk	Russia	For Imperial Russian Navy.
9 October	Sviatoi Konstantin	Aleksandr-class rowing frigate	D. Masalsky	Saint Petersburg	Russia	For Imperial Russian Navy.
9 October	Sviatoi Nikolai	Aleksandr-class rpwing frigate	D. Masalsky	Saint Petersburg	Russia	For Imperial Russian Navy.
31 October	Sviatoi Mikhail	Fourth rate	A. S. Katsanov	Kherson	Russia	For Imperial Russian Navy.
October	Ajax	Corvette		Harlingen	Batavian Republic	For Batavian Navy.
15 November	Warley	East Indiaman	Perry & Co.	Blackwall	Great Britain	For British East India Company.
29 November	Stork	Cormorant-class ship-sloop	Thomas Pollard	Deptford Dockyard	Great Britain	For Royal Navy.
30 November	Neptune	East Indiaman	Wells	Deptford	Great Britain	For British East India Company.
15 December	Earl of Abergavenny	East Indiaman	Pitcher	Northfleet	Great Britain	For British East India Company.
Unknown date	Admiral Kingsmill	Brig			Great Britain	For J. Roche.
Unknown date	Affinity	Merchantman	John & Philip Laing	Sunderland	Great Britain	For J. Davie.
Unknown date	Alknomac	Brig		Boston, Massachusetts	United States	For Gairdner & Mitchell.
Unknown date	Amphitrite	Merchantman		Hull	Great Britain	For Mr. Atkinson.
Unknown date	Armenia	Merchantman		Calcutta	India	For Mr. Walker.
Unknown date	Arrow	Dart-class sloop	Hobbs & Hellyer	Redbridge	Great Britain	For Royal Navy.
Unknown date	Beaver	Slave ship		Liverpool	Great Britain	For Mr Molineaux.
Unknown date	Brilliant	Schooner		Itchen Ferry	Great Britain	Purchased on the stocks by the Royal Navy.
Unknown date	Bülheves	Fifth rate	Mustafa Molla	Kalas	Ottoman Empire	For Ottoman Navy.
Unknown date	Ceres	East Indiaman	John Perry	Blackwall Yard	Great Britain	For British East India Company.
Unknown date	Cicero	West Indiaman		Sunderland	Great Britain	For private owner.
Unknown date	Coutts	East Indiaman			Great Britain	For British East India Company.
Unknown date	Dart	Privateer			Great Britain	For private owner.
Unknown date	Dart	Experimental sloop-of-war	Hobbs & Hellyer	Redbridge	Great Britain	For Royal Navy.
Unknown date	Deux Amis	Privateer			France	For private owner.
Unknown date	Dilgencia	Fifth rate	Reales Astilleros de Esteiro	Ferrol	Spain	For Spanish Navy.
Unknown date	Don Quixote	Brig	Nicholas Bools	Bridport	Great Britain	For Mr. Tremlett.
Unknown date	Eagle	Brig			United States	For private owner.
Unknown date	Earl Talbot	East Indiaman	John Perry	Blackwall Yard	Great Britain	For British East India Company.
Unknown date	Eliza	Sloop	Nicholas Bools & William Good	Bridport	Great Britain	For Joseph Down and others.
Unknown date	Galgo	Sloop-of-war		Ferrol	Spain	For Spanish Navy.
Unknown date	Gemini	Merchantman	John & Philip Laing	Sunderland	Great Britain	For James Swan.
Unknown date	Hardi	Privateer		Bordeaux	France	For private owner.
Unknown date	Harrington	Brig		Calcutta	India	For Bengal Pilot Service.
Unknown date	Heybetendaz	Third rate	Nikoli Kalfa	Bodrum	Ottoman Empire	For Ottoman Navy.
Unknown date	Hindostan	East Indiaman			Great Britain	For British East India Company.
Unknown date	Hypomenes	Merchantman	John & Philip Laing	Sunderland	Great Britain	For W. White.
Unknown date	L'Actif	Privateer	Mathurin Crucy	Nantes	France	For [private owner.
Unknown date	Gaieté	Bonne Citoyenne-class corvette		Bayonne	France	For French Navy.
Unknown date	Libre	Romaine-class frigate		Le Havre	France	For French Navy.
Unknown date	La Nouvelle Eugenie	Privateer		Nantes	France	For Feliz Cossin de Chourses.
Unknown date	Mesken-i Gazi	Fourth rate	Jacques Balthazar Brun de Sainte Catherine	Constantinople	Ottoman Empire	For Ottoman Navy.
Unknown date	Mürg-ı Bahri	Sixth rate	Çamlicali Kalfa		Ottoman Empire	For Ottoman Navy.
Unknown date	Neptune	Merchantman	John & Philip Laing	Sunderland	Great Britain	For Peddie & Co.
Unknown date	Princess of Wales	Hoy	Barnstaple	Broadstairs	Great Britain	For private owner.
Unknown date	Rambler	Cutter	Thomas Jones King	Dover	Great Britain	For Royal Navy.
Unknown date	Rattler	Collier			Great Britain	For private owner.
Unknown date	Rehber-i Nusret	Sixth rate	Fredirk Ludwig af Klintberg	Rhodes	(Ottoman Empire) Ottoman Greece	For Ottoman Navy.
Unknown date	Rosina	Merchantman	James Walmsley	North Shields	Great Britain	For private owner.
Unknown date	Rover	Sloop-of-war	Nathaniel Tynes	Bermuda	(Kingdom of Great Britain) Bermuda	For Royal Navy.
Unknown date	San José	Polacca			Spain	For Spanish Navy.
Unknown date	Şehper-i Zafer	Fourth rate	Antuvan Kalfa	Rhodes	(Ottoman Empire) Ottoman Greece	For Ottoman Navy.
Unknown date	Şevketnüma	Fourth rate	Filip Kalfa	Lemnos	(Ottoman Empire) Ottoman Greece	For Ottoman Navy.
Unknown date	Stag	Sloop	Nicholas Bools & William Good	Bridport	Great Britain	For William Styles and others.
Unknown date	Tarleton	Slave ship		Liverpool	Great Britain	For Tarleton & Co.
Unknown date	Vaillante	Bonne Citoyenne-class corvette			France	For French Navy.
Unknown date	Varuna	Merchantman		Calcutta	India	For Prinsep & Co.
Unknown date	Zafer Küsa	Sixth rate	Jacques Balthazar Brun de Sainte Catherine	Constantinople	Ottoman Empire	For Ottoman Navy.
Unknown date	Ziver-i Bahri	Third rate	Ahmed Hoca Kaptan	Midilli	Ottoman Empire	For Ottoman Navy.
Unknown date	Name unknown	Merchantman		Batavian Republic or Denmark-Norway	Unknown	For private owner.
Unknown date	Name unknown	Merchantman			United States	For private owner.
Unknown date	Name unknown	Merchantman			France	For private owner.
Unknown date	Name unknown	Merchantman			United States	For private owner.
