= Thames (ship) =

Several vessels have been named Thames, for the River Thames:

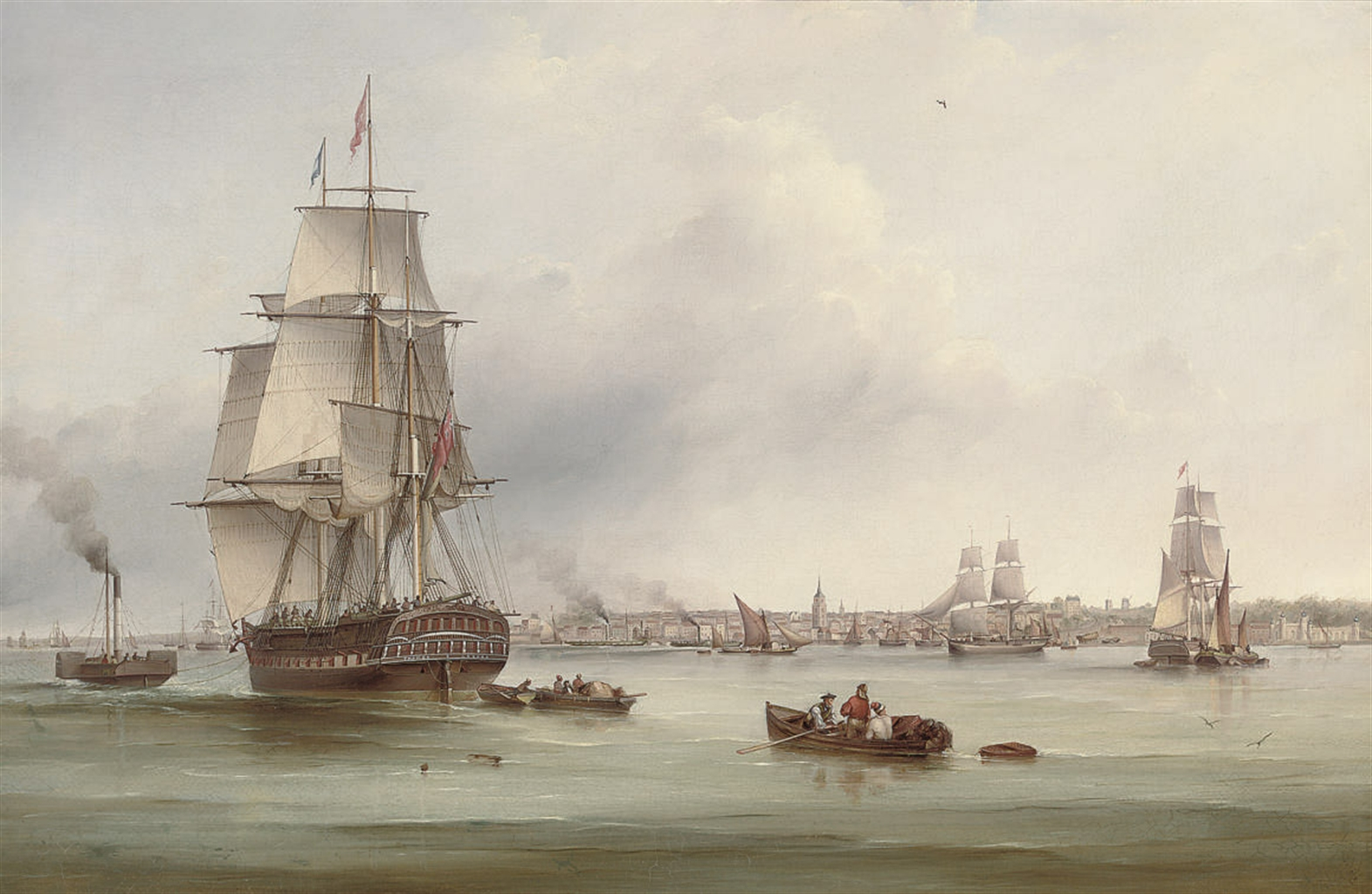
The Thames, launched in 1829, under tow off Gravesend

- Thames was launched in 1774 in Virginia, possibly under another name. Between at least 1781 and 1786 she was a London transport. Then from 1786 until 1794, she became the Hull-based whaler Ranger (1786 ship). She was last listed in 1798, but with no record of voyages after 1794.
- Thames (1786 ship) was launched in 1786 on the Thames. She sailed between London and Africa; she was last listed in 1790.
- Thames (1790 ship) was launched at Southampton in 1790. Until 1798 she sailed across the Atlantic, trading primarily with The Bahamas. She then became a slave ship, making seven voyages transporting enslaved people between Africa and the Caribbean. After the abolition of the British slave trade in 1807, Thames returned to trading with the West Indies. A French privateer captured Thames on 17 July 1811, and burnt her.
- Thames (1794 ship) was launched in London. The French captured her in late 1795, but the British Royal Navy recaptured her within weeks. She then disappeared from the registers for some years. She reappeared as Thames in 1800, sailing as a West Indiaman. In 1802 new owners sailed her as a slave ship. She made one full voyage as a slave ship before French privateers captured her in 1805 after she had gathered captives in West Africa but before she could deliver them to a port in the British Caribbean.
- Thames (1796 EIC ship) was launched on the Thames as an East Indiaman. She made eight voyages for the British East India Company (EIC). She was sold for breaking up in 1816.
- Thames (1805 ship) was a Spanish vessel launched in 1804, almost certainly under a different name, and captured circa 1805. She became a whaler, making eight whaling voyages between 1805 and 1826. Although the registers carried Thames for some years after her return from her eighth voyage, there is no evidence that she ever sailed again.
- Thames (1807 ship) was launched in Howden. She first sailed as a West Indiaman, and later traded with Brazil. Privateers captured her twice. The first time the British Royal Navy was able swiftly to recapture her. The second time Thames's American captor sent her into Portland, Maine.
- Thames (1807 American ship) was launched in New York in 1798, probably under another name. Bebby & Co., of Liverpool, acquired her circa 1807. An American privateer captured Thames in 1813 as Thames was sailing from Africa, and sent her into Boston.
- Thames (1818 ship) was launched as an East Indiaman, trading with India and Ceylon under a license from the British East India Company (EIC). She made one voyage transporting convicts to Van Diemen's Land. She became leaky and was condemned at Swan River in 1830 as she was sailing to Île de France from having delivered her convicts at Hobart.
- Thames, of 454 or 455 tons, was built in London in 1829 as a West Indiaman. Her first owners were Hibberts & Co., of London. Later, Thompson, of London owned her. She sailed for over thirty years.

== See also ==
- HMS Thames – any one of eight vessels of the British Royal Navy
- HM Hired Armed Ship Thames, of 11850/94 tons (bm), and ten 18-pounder carronades, served the Royal Navy between 12 May 1804 and 6 December 1805. She primarily escorted convoys in the North Sea between Leith and Elsinore.
