= Transport vessels for the cancelled British invasion of Manila =

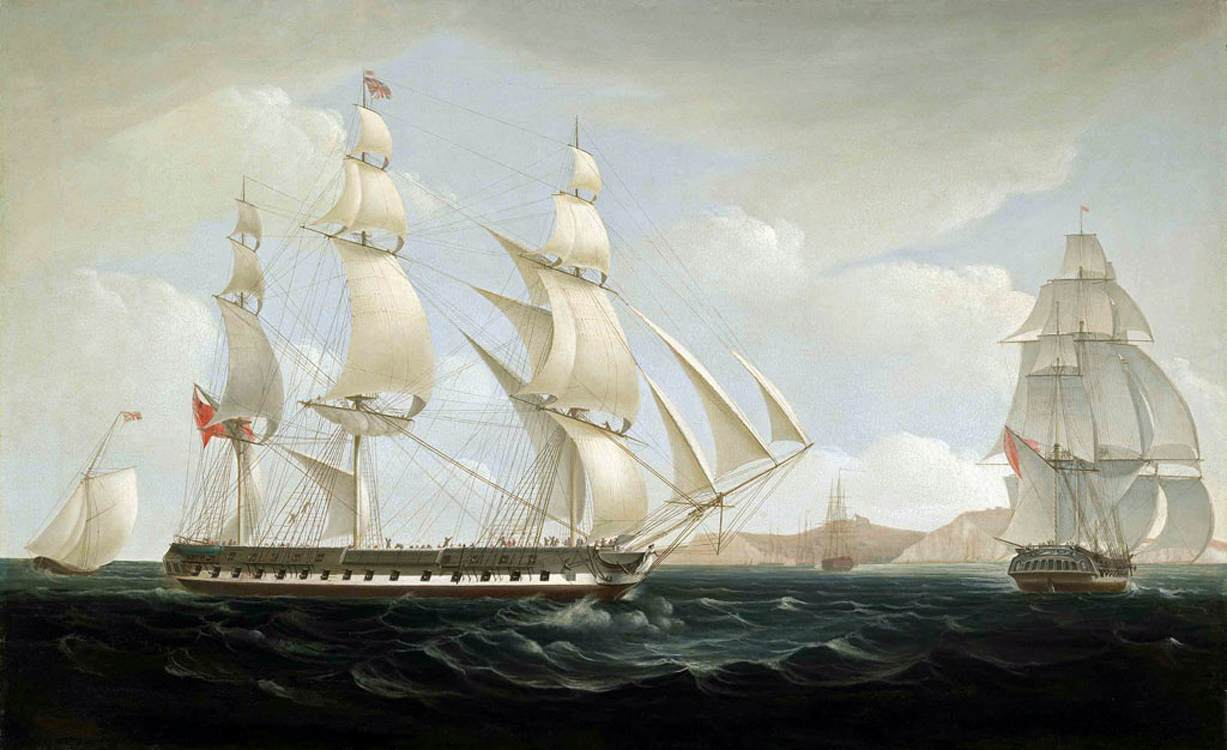
Ceres, one of the transport vessels chartered for the cancelled invasion

In 1797, the East India Company (EIC) chartered a number of East Indiamen and "country ships" to serve as transport vessels for a planned British invasion of Manila, the capital of the Spanish Captaincy General of the Philippines. The vessels gathered at Penang in September and waited there. However, the British government cancelled the invasion following a diplomatic overtures with Spain and the EIC released the vessels it had engaged. After the invasion was cancelled, the captains of the ships engaged sued the EIC for demurrage.

The EIC held several vessels in India to support the expedition. There were eight regular ships: Lord Camden, Busbridge, Minerva, Lord Macartney, Lord Hawkesbury, Sir Stephen Lushington, Phoenix and General Goddard, and three "dismantled ships": Pitt, Lascalles, and Royal Admiral. Several EIC "extra ships" on a voyage charter were also engaged for the cancelled invasion. The captains of all the vessels sued the EIC for demurrage, citing expenses they had incurred due to the delay to their homeward bound journeys, and for the eight regular ships, the additional risks involved in the detours to Penang. In 1800, British authorities awarded six of the captains of the regular ships £750 each, and further ordered that the officers of all vessels involved receive payment from the EIC.

== EIC ships ==
Vessel	Claim for transport services (£sd)	Claim for demurrage (days)	Claim for demurrage (£sd)
Atlantic	7,600 – 7 – 2		
Busbridge		292	6,083 – 6 – 8
Ceres		59	1,597 – 18 – 4
Crown	6,753 - 18 - 3		
Duckenfield Hall	6,401 – 19 – 2		
Earl Talbot		59	1,597 – 18 – 4
Eliza Ann	13,249 – 6 – 6		
General Goddard		179	3,729 – 3 – 4
Harriott (or Harriet)	10,438 – 3 – 2		
Lascelles		272	8,440 – 16 – 0
Lord Camden		206	4,291 – 13 – 4
Lord Hawkesbury		207	4,312 – 10 – 0
Lord Macartney		217	4,520 – 16 – 8
Minerva		106	2,308 – 6 – 8
Phoenix		292	6.083 – 6 – 8
Pitt		229	6,655 – 6 – 3
Princess Mary	10,148 – 13 – 7		
Princess Royal	5,819 – 15 – 5		
Sir Stephen Lushington		210	3,192 – 0 – 0

== Country ships ==
The list of the names of the country ships comes from a House of Commons Select Committee report. The charter costs and period come from the Bengal Journal (April 1798; p. 614.)

Vessel	Burthen (bm)	Charter rate sicca rupees	Period
Abercromby	600	8,500/mo.	10 June 1797 to 10 February 1798
Ajax	460	6,000/mo.	3 June 1797 to 3 February 1798
Calcutta		10,000/mo.	25 May 1797 to 28 February 1798
Charlotte	350	£4,000/mo.	Three months advance
Chichester	450	6,000/mo.	20 June to 20 December 1797
Hercules	450	6,000/mo.	3 June 1797 to 3 February 1798
India	800	10,500/mo.	25 May to 25 November 1797 + 10 days demurrage@£100/day
Munster Lass	350	3,500/mo.	2 June 1797 to 3 April 1798
Nancy	705	10,0000/mo.	11 June to 10 December 1797
Triton	950	10,500/mo.	25 May 1797 to 25 March 1798
Union	350	4,000/mo.	20 June 1797 to 20 March 1798
Brisk (Note: Purchased for £38,000 for service as a ship's tender.)			
Eliza Ann (Note: Possibly same Eliza Ann as above.)			
Goonony (Note: Fireship)			
Trident (Note: Possibly HMS Trident, listed by mistake.)			

In addition Martha was lost in the Hooghli River in July "going on an expedition".
