= Walmer (disambiguation) =

Walmer is a town in England. It may also refer to:

== Places ==
=== Australia ===
- Walmer, Victoria

=== South Africa ===
- Walmer Estate, Cape Town
- Walmer, Port Elizabeth

=== United Kingdom ===
- Walmer Crescent

== People ==
- Cassie Walmer (1888–1980), British entertainer
- Walmer Martinez (born 1998), American-Salvadoran footballer

== Ships ==
- Walmer Castle (ship)

== See also ==
- Walder
