= French expedition to Ireland order of battle =

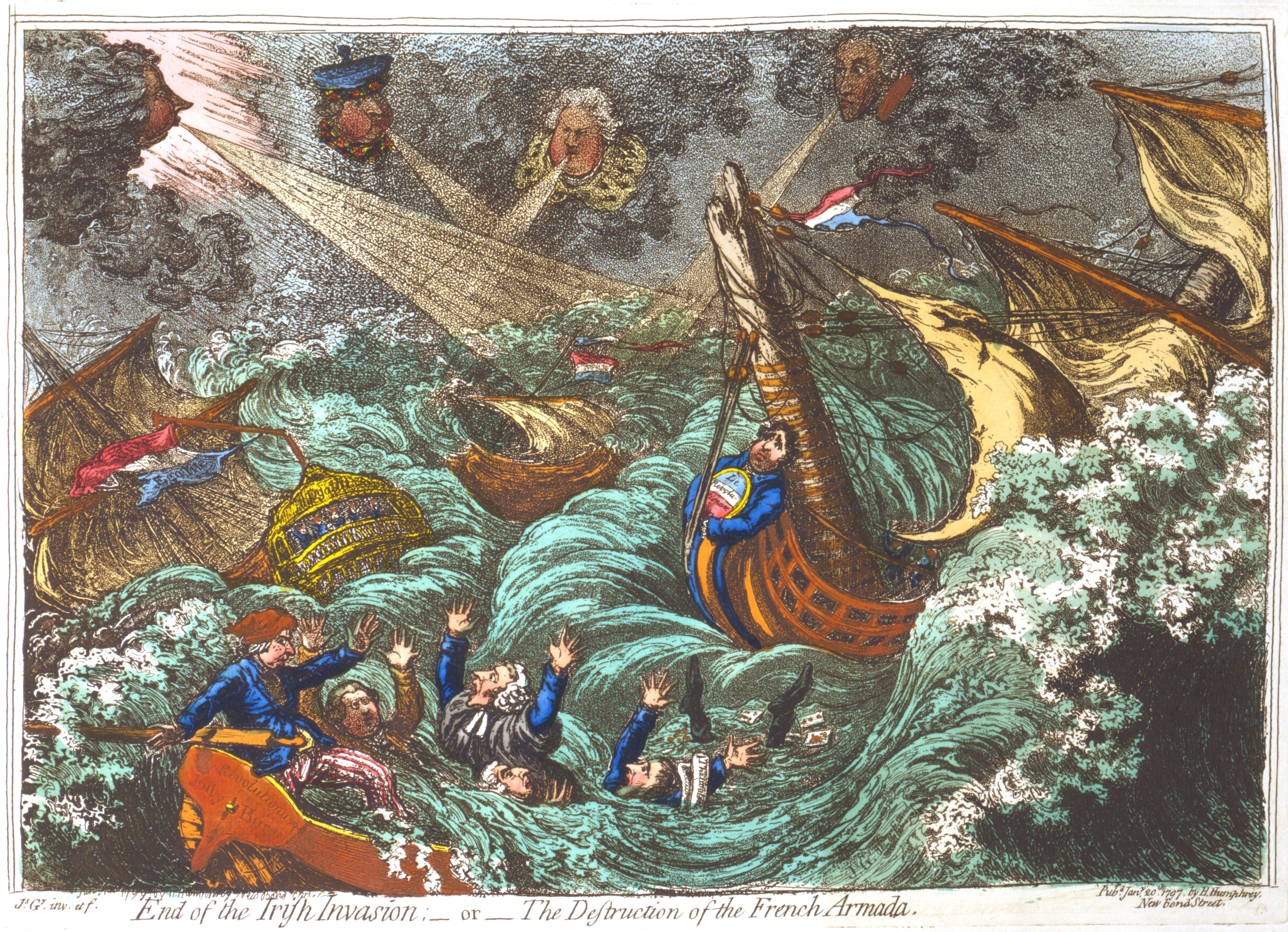
Cartoon by James Gillray mocking the expedition's failure

A French expedition to Ireland was launched in December 1796 during the War of the First Coalition. Encouraged by representatives of the Society of United Irishmen, an Irish republican organisation, the French Directory decided that the best strategy for knocking Britain out of the war was to invade British-ruled Ireland. It was hoped that a substantial invasion in the summer of 1796 would encourage a widespread uprising among the Irish population and force the British to abandon Ireland, providing a major strategic and propaganda coup for the French Republic and a staging point for a subsequent invasion of Britain. Assigned to lead the operation was General Lazare Hoche, the Republic's most successful military commander, who was provided with a significant body of troops and the services of the entire French Atlantic fleet.^{[A]}

Preparation for the invasion was slow throughout the autumn, and it was not until December that the force was ready to leave Brest. The delay was principally the result of poor organisation and discipline within the French Navy, and preparations were only completed once the commander at Brest, Vice-amiral Villaret de Joyeuse, had been replaced with Vice-amiral Morard de Galles and Hoche given direct command of discipline within the fleet. Departing Brest on 15 December, the French invasion fleet was almost immediately scattered: a combination of bad weather, inexperience at sea and the depredations of British frigates dispersing the force and destroying one ship of the line. As separate ships and small squadrons made their way independently to the rendezvous point off Mizen Head, the flagship frigate Fraternité was chased deep into the Atlantic by a British frigate and took more than a week to return to Ireland. In that time the rest of the fleet, buffeted by the worst winter storms since 1708, broke up off the landing beaches in Bantry Bay, the weather too fierce to allow any amphibious landings.

By the last week of December 1796 the fleet was in full retreat, having failed to land a single soldier in Ireland. Several ships were wrecked or foundered in heavy seas, and a British frigate squadron based at Cork managed to seize a number of lone frigates and transports during the first two weeks of January. The main British fleet, although ordered to intercept the invasion force, made little progress and did not arrive in the Western Approaches until 13 January, by which time all except three French ships had been accounted for. Two, including the flagship Fraternité, were chased by the British fleet, eventually reaching safety at Rochefort. The third, the ship of the line Droits de l'Homme, was intercepted by two British frigates led by Captain Sir Edward Pellew and destroyed in a running action that cost the lives of over 1,000 Frenchmen.

In total, French losses were 12 ships captured or destroyed and over 2,000 men drowned. The Brest fleet was so badly damaged by the operation that they launched no major operations during 1797 and were unable to respond when the British fleet was paralysed by the Spithead Mutiny a few months later. A second French attempt to invade Ireland was launched in the summer of 1798, in response to the Irish Rebellion, but this too ended in disaster: all of the men landed were captured a few weeks later at the Battle of Ballinamuck. A third and final invasion effort was defeated and destroyed by a British squadron at the Battle of Tory Island in October 1798.

== Order of battle ==
Ships of the line
Ship	Guns	Commander	Notes
Indomptable	80	Commodore Jacques Bedout	Returned to Brest on 1 January.
Droits de l'Homme	74	Commodore Jean-Baptiste Raymond de Lacrosse	Wrecked on 14 January 1797 in action with HMS Indefatigable and HMS Amazon. 253 of her crew were killed or wounded and a further 400-900 drowned.
Constitution	74	Commodore Louis Lhéritier	Returned to Brest on 11 January.
Pégase	74	Counter-admiral Joseph de Richery; Commodore Clement Laronier	Returned to Brest on 11 January.
Nestor	74	Commodore Charles Linois	Returned to Brest on 13 January.
Révolution	74	Commodore Pierre Dumanoir le Pelley	Returned to Rochefort on 13 January.
Fougueux	74	Commodore Esprit-Tranquille Maistral	Returned to Brest on 1 January.
Trajan	74	Commodore Julien Le Ray	Returned to Brest on 11 January.
Mucius	74	Commodore Pierre Quérangal	Returned to Brest on 1 January.
Tourville	74	Ship-of-the-line Captain Jean-Baptiste Henry	Returned to Brest on 13 January.
Pluton	74	Ship-of-the-line Captain Jean-Marie Lebrun	Returned to Brest on 11 January.
Éole	74	Ship-of-the-line Captain Joseph-Pierre-André Malin	Returned to Brest on 13 January.
Wattignies	74	Ship-of-the-line Captain Henri-Alexandre Thévenard	Returned to Brest on 11 January.
Cassard	74	Ship-of-the-line Captain Dufay	Returned to Brest on 13 January.
Redoutable	74	Ship-of-the-line Captain Pierre-Augustin Moncousu	Returned to Brest on 1 January.
Patriote	74	Ship-of-the-line Captain La Fargue	Returned to Brest on 1 January.
Séduisant	74	Commodore Jean-Baptiste Henry	Wrecked on 16 December 1796 on the Stevenant Rock near Brest; between 530 and 1,150 men drowned.
Source: James, pp. 4–5, Clowes, p. 298

Frigates
Ship	Guns	Commander	Notes
Scévola	44	Frigate Captain Le Bozec	Scuttled after storm damage on 30 December 1796.
Impatiente	40		Wrecked on 30 December 1796 near Crookhaven; 420 of her crew drowned.
Romaine	40		Returned to Brest.
Immortalité	40	Flagship of Contre-amiral François Joseph Bouvet	Returned to Brest.
Tartu	40		Captured on 30 December 1796 by HMS Polyphemus.
Bellone	32		Returned to Brest.
Bravoure	40		Returned to Lorient.
Charente	36		Returned to Brest.
Cocarde	40		Returned to Brest.
Fraternité	32	Flagship of Vice-amiral Morard de Galles	Returned to Rochefort on 13 January.
Résolue	32	Flagship of Contre-amiral Joseph Marie Nielly	Badly damaged in collision with Indomptable. Returned to Brest on 13 January.
Sirène	36		Returned to Brest.
Surveillante	32		Scuttled in Bantry Bay on 30 December 1796.
Source: James, pp. 4–5, Clowes, p. 298

Corvettes
Ship	Guns	Commander	Notes
Affronteur	16		Returned to Brest.
Vautour	16		Returned to Brest.
Atalante	20		Captured on 10 January 1797 by HMS Phoebe.
Voltigeur	16		Returned to Brest.
Mutine	14		Captured on 29 May 1797 at Santa Cruz.
Renard	16		Returned to Brest.
Source: James, pp. 4–5, Clowes, p. 298

Transports
Ship	Guns	Commander	Notes
Nicodème			Returned to Brest.
Justine			Disarmed frigate. Captured on 30 December 1796 by HMS Polyphemus.
Fille Unique			Sank in the Bay of Biscay on 6 January 1797.
Ville de Lorient			Disarmed frigate. Captured on 7 January 1797 by HMS Unicorn, HMS Doris and HMS Druid.
Suffren			Disarmed frigate. Captured on 30 December 1796 by HMS Jason, recaptured by Tartu and captured again and destroyed on 8 January 1797 by HMS Daedalus.
Allègre			Captured on 12 January 1797 by HMS Spitfire.
Expériment			Returned to Brest.
Source: James, pp. 4–5, Clowes, p. 298

== Notes ==
A. Sources vary on the exact number of French troops that eventually participated in the campaign. Pakenham gives 12,000, Clowes, James, Woodman and Henderson suggest 18,000 (although James quotes estimates between 16,200 and 25,000), while Regan and Come indicate approximately 20,000, although Come comments that they were of low quality.

== Bibliography ==
- Clowes, William Laird (1997) [1900]. The Royal Navy, A History from the Earliest Times to 1900, Volume IV. Chatham Publishing. ISBN 1-86176-013-2.
- Come, Donald R. (Winter 1952). "French Threat to British Shores, 1793–1798". Military Affairs. 16 (4). Society for Military History: 174–188. doi:10.2307/1982368. JSTOR 1982368.
- Gardiner, Robert, ed. (2001) [1996]. Fleet Battle and Blockade. Caxton Editions. ISBN 1-84067-363-X.
- Henderson CBE, James (1994) [1970]. The Frigates. Leo Cooper. ISBN 0-85052-432-6.
- James, William (2002) [1827]. The Naval History of Great Britain, Volume 2, 1797–1799. Conway Maritime Press. ISBN 0-85177-906-9.
- Pakenham, Thomas (2000) [1997]. The Year of Liberty: The Story of the Great Irish Rebellion of 1798. London: Abacus. ISBN 978-0-349-11252-7. Rev. ed.
- Regan, Geoffrey (2001). Naval Blunders. Andre Deutsch. ISBN 0-233-99978-7.
- Woodman, Richard (2001). The Sea Warriors. Constable Publishers. ISBN 1-84119-183-3.
