= Barwell (1782 ship) =

History

Great Britain
- Name: Barwell
- Namesake: William Barwell
- Owner: Sir Richard Neave, 1st Baronet (1782-1804); Fletcher & Company (1804-??)
- Builder: John & William Wells, Deptford
- Launched: 23 September 1782
- Fate: Last listed 1807

General characteristics
- Tons burthen: 796, or 796 91/94 (bm)
- Length: 145 ft 7 in (44.4 m) (overall; 118 ft 4 in (36.1 m) (keel)
- Beam: 35 ft 7 in (10.8 m)
- Depth of hold: 14 ft 9 in (4.5 m)
- Complement: 1793: 105; 1800: 70
- Armament: 1793:26 x 12 & 6-pounder guns; 1800:26 x 9 & 12 & 18-pounder guns

Barwell was a merchantman launched in 1782. She made six voyages for the British East India Company (EIC). She then left the EIC's service but continued to sail. She made one voyage in 1797 transporting convicts in 1797 from England to Australia. She was last listed in 1807.

== East India Company service ==
=== Voyage 1 (1783-84) ===
Captain Robert Carr left Portsmouth on 11 March 1783, sailing for Madras and Bengal. On 19 June Barwell reached Johanna (Anjouan in the Comoros), on 22 July Madras, and 14 September she arrived at Kedgeree. For her return to England she reached Saugor (West Bengal) on 31 December, St Helena on 28 April 1784, and Deptford on 2 August.

=== Voyage 2 (1785-86) ===
Captain Robert Carr sailed Barwell for China, leaving the Downs on 12 March 1785. She reached Whampoa on 21 September. For her return leg she crossed the Second Bar on 14 January 1786. She reached St Helena on 6 May and Deptford on 10 August. Carr died in his lodgings on St James's Street in London on 14 December.

=== Voyage 3 (1787-89) ===
Captain Thomas Welladvice took command of Barwell. He would be her captain for this and her subsequent three voyages for the EIC. She left Portsmouth on 21 December 1787 and reached Madras on 5 May 1788. From there she sailed to Benkulen, which she reached on 15 July, and 15 September Whampoa, which she reached on 15 September. For her return to England she crossed the Second Bar on 29 November. She reached the Cape on 5 February 1789, and St Helena on 14 February. Barwell arrived at Long Reach on 4 April.

It was during this homeward voyage that Welladvice narrowly avoided the disaster of wrecking on the Isles of Scilly as Admiral Cloudesley Shovell had in the Scilly naval disaster of 1707. Welladvice had with him a naval chronometer made by John Arnold. One night, when Welladvice calculated Barwell's position, he determined that she had to be near the Isles and moored her at midnight. Daybreak revealed the rocks in front of her.

=== Voyage 4 (1790-91) ===
Welladvice left the Downs on 18 January 1790. Barwell reached Bombay on 15 May, and Whampoa on 6 August. She crossed the Second Bar on 15 November, arrived at the Cape on 10 April 1791, St Helena on 28 April, and Long Reach on 29 June.

=== Voyage 5 (1793-94) ===
War with France having broken out, Welladvice acquired a letter of marque on 21 March 1793. This gave him the right to act offensively vis-a-vis the French, not just defensively, should the opportunity arise. He sailed from Portsmouth on 22 May 1793, bound for Bombay. Barwell was part of a convoy that also included the East Indiamen Prince William, Lord Thurlow, William Pitt, Glatton, Pigot, Earl of Oxford, Osterley, Fort William, London, Houghton, Marquis of Landsdown, Hillsborough, Ceres, and Earl of Abergavenny, amongst numerous other vessels, merchant and military, most of the non-Indiamen travelling to the Mediterranean.

Barwell reached Johanna on 26 August and Bombay 17 September. She then visited a number of ports in area, arriving on 26 October at Tellicherry, on 12 November at Anjengo, three days later at Quilon, on 27 November at Cochin, and on 1 December at Calicut. She returned to Tellicherry on 4 December and Bombay on 14 December. On 27 February 1794 Barwell reached the Cape. She arrived at St Helena on 18 March, Galway on 20 July, and Long Reach on 31 August.

=== Voyage 6 (1795-96) ===
For her last voyage for the EIC, Welladvice left Portsmouth on 24 May 1795. Barwell reached Bombay on 3 September, Calicut on 6 November, Anjengo on 16 November, Quilon on 22 November, Calicut on 7 December, Tellicherry on 12 December, and Bombay on 28 December. On her return voyage Barwell arrived at St Helena on 22 March 1796, and Long Reach on 8 August.

Barwell then left the EIC's service. However, she made one more trip for the company, but this time on contract.

== Convict transport ==
Under the command of John Cameron, Barwell sailed from Portsmouth on 7 November 1797, She arrived at the Cape on 21 February 1798. While sailing to Australia, Cameron suppressed a mutiny on board the Barwell. She arrived at Port Jackson on 18 May 1798. She embarked 296 male convicts; nine convicts died on the voyage.

When Barwell reached Port Jackson Cameron charged Ensign George Bond, of the New South Wales Corps, with mutiny. Bond counter-sued, charging Cameron with false imprisonment, assault, defamation, deprivation of rations, false testimony, and loss of employment. Bond sought £10,000 in damages. Unfortunately, there is no record of the outcome of either case.

Barwell left Port Jackson on 17 August bound for China. Between 17 September and 2 December she was at Whampoa.

For her return to England she crossed the Second Bar on 20 January 1799. She reached Malacca on 22 February, the Cape on 3 May, and St Helena on 18 June. She left St Helena on 6 July in the company of the Indiamen Tellicherry, Triton, and Armenian, and under escort by the 18-gun Cornwallis. (Note: Armenian is probably the EIC country ship Armenia. She was built in 1796; the French 18-gun privateer Clarisse captured her in 1800 after a fight that resulted in Armenia losing one man killed and several wounded before she surrendered. HMS Cornwallis was an 18-gun brig that did not enter into Admiralty records. A few passing mentions in other contexts are the sole indicators of her existence. She appears to have been purchased at the Cape of Good Hope. Lieutenant Richard Byron was appointed to command her in March 1798 and to Commander on 22 June. He sailed her "with dispatches" to Britain, where she was paid off and seemingly never returned to service.) Barwell left the convoy on 24 July off the Western Islands. She arrived at Plymouth on 11 September. There she discharged her passengers, one of whom was carrying dispatches for the British government from Governor Hunter in Australia. She left Plymouth on 13 September with the 18-gun ship-sloop HMS Voltiguer as escort. Barwell reached Long Reach on 17 September.

== Later career ==
Lloyd's Register for 1799 has Scott & Co. as her owner, E. Redman as her master, and her trade as London and Botany Bay. In 1800 her ownership transferred to Fletcher & Co., and her master was listed as John Toole. Her trade was given as Lisbon. On 3 February 1800, Toole received a letter of marque for Barwell. In 1805 Barwell, J. Toole, master, was still listed as trading between London and Lisbon.

She was reportedly stolen by her master, Captain John Poole, in 1811. (Note: It is not clear what the original source of this account is. The report shows up in Hackman, but Hackman does not link the report to a source. Barwell last appears in Lloyd's Register in 1807, still with Fletcher & Co. as owners and J. Toole as master. Lloyd's List does not mention the event either.)
