= Munster Lass =

Several vessels have been called Munster Lass:

- Munster Lass (1760 ship) was launched in the Thirteen Colonies in 1760 or 1762. She was captured and recaptured in 1780. She served the Royal Navy in 1781, and then disappeared from online records.
- Munster Lass, of 350 tons (bm), and of unknown origin and fate, was chartered in 1798 by the British Government for the later cancelled attack on Manila.
- Munster Lass (1828 ship), of 280 tons (bm), was launched on 25 October 1828 at St Johns, New Brunswick, as a steam trader and three-masted schooner. She made at least one voyage to Ireland. She was wrecked in 1830 in the St Lawrence river; her crew was saved.
- Munster Lass (1834 ship) was built at Ipswich in 1834. She was wrecked in 1844 at Coblers Rock, Barbados after gathering guano at Ichaboe Island.
