= Glatton (EIC ship) =

Four vessels named Glatton sailed as East Indiamen for the British East India Company (EIC)".

- Glatton (1762 EIC ship) was launched at Deptford. She made four voyages for the EIC before her owners sold her in 1772. She became the transport Lord Howe, which was last listed in 1781, and may have foundered in 1781.
- Glatton (1777 EIC ship) was launched at Deptford. She made four voyages for the EIC. She was sold in 1789 for breaking up.
- HMS Glatton (1795) was a 56-gun fourth rate of the Royal Navy. Wells & Co. of Blackwell launched her on 29 November 1792 for the EIC as Glatton. The Royal Navy bought her in 1795 and converted her into a warship. She served in the North Sea and the Baltic, and transported convicts to Australia. She then returned to naval service in the Mediterranean. After the end of the Napoleonic Wars the Admiralty converted her to a water depot at Sheerness. In 1830 the Admiralty converted Glatton to a breakwater and sank her at Harwich.
- Glatton (1796 EIC ship) was launched in Rotherhithe. Between 1796 and 1815 she made eight voyages to South-East Asia, China, and India for the EIC. In 1815 her owners sold her for use as a hulk.
