= Carnatic (1787 EIC ship) =

History
- Name: Carnatic
- Namesake: Carnatic region
- Owner: EIC voyages #1-2:Gilbert Slater; EIC voyages #3-6:John Jackson
- Builder: Randall, Rotherhithe
- Launched: 10 November 1787
- Fate: Sold for breaking up 1802

General characteristics
- Tons burthen: 1169, or 11694/94 (bm)
- Length: Overall:163 ft 2 in (49.7 m); Keel:132 ft 7 1/2 in (40.4 m)
- Beam: 40 ft 8 1/2 in (12.4 m)
- Depth of hold: 16 ft 4 in (5.0 m)
- Propulsion: Sail
- Complement: 1793:110; 1800:110
- Armament: 1793:26 × 9&4-pounder guns; 1800::26 × 9-pounder guns
- Notes: Three decks

Carnatic was launched in 1787. She made six voyages as an East Indiaman for the British East India Company (EIC). She was sold for breaking up in 1802.

== Career ==
EIC voyage #1 (1788–1789): Captain John Corner sailed from The Downs on 29 January 1788, bound for Madras and China. Carnatic was at Madeira on 3 March, reached Madras on 26 June, was at Penang on 24 August, and arrived at Whampoa anchorage on 15 October. Homeward bound, she crossed the Second Bar on 26 January 1789, reached St Helena on 18 March, and arrived at Long Reach on 3 July.

EIC voyage #2 (1791–1792): Captain Corner sailed from Portsmouth on 3 February 1791, bound for Madras and China. Carnatic reached Madras on 30 May and Malacca on 22 August. She arrived at Whampoa on 22 September. Homeward bound, she crossed the Second Bar on 12 December, reached Batavia on 19 January 1792 and St Helena on 7 April; she arrived at Long Reach on 10 June. Captain Corner brought several Camellia japonica 'Alba Plena' back with him for Gilbert Slater.

EIC voyage #3 (1794–1795): War with France had broken out in 1793. Captain James Jackson acquired a letter of marque on 30 November 1793.

The British government held Carnatic at Portsmouth, together with 38 other Indiamen in anticipation of using them as transports for an attack on Île de France (Mauritius). The government gave up the plan and released the vessels in May 1794. It paid £3,440 for having delayed Carnatic's departure by 129 days.

Captain Jackson sailed from Portsmouth on 2 May, bound for Madras and China. Carnatic reached Madras on 11 September and Penang on 23 October. On 25 December she sighted Pulo Anna, from which it can be inferred that she sailed to China via the Pacific rather than the South China Sea. She arrived at Whampoa on 21 January 1795. Homeward bound, she crossed the Second Bar on 5 March, and reached Malacca on 26 April and St Helena on 31 August. She was at Finish Roads, Ireland, on 13 November, and arrived at Long Reach on 27 December.

EIC voyage #4 (1796–1798): Captain Jackson sailed from Portsmouth on 11 August 1796. Carnatic reached St Helena and 16 October and Amboina on 8 January 1797. She reached Whampoa on 18 March. Homeward bound, she crossed the Second Bar on 28 April. On 3 August she was in company with Thames and again sighted Pulo Anna. On 23 October she reached the Cape of Good Hope and on 3 December St Helena. She arrived at Long Reach on 4 February 1798. George Palmer, later commander of Boddam, made his first voyage on this trip.

EIC voyage #5 (1798–1800): Captain Jackson sailed from Portsmouth on 31 December 1798, bound for Bombay and China. Carnatic reached the Cape of Good Hope on 25 March 1799, Johanna on 12 May, and Bombay on 11 June. She reached Malacca on 14 September and arrived at Whampoa on 30 October. Homeward bound, she crossed the Second Bar on 22 December, and reached Malacca on 18 January 1800. She reached St Helena on 11 April and arrived at Long Reach on 26 June.

EIC voyage #6 (1801–1802): Captain Horatio Beevor acquired a letter of marque on 10 December 1800. He sailed from Portsmouth on 9 January 1801, bound for St.Helena, Bencoolen and China. Carnatic reached St Helena on 4 April and Bencoolen on 12 July. She was at Penang on 26 August and Malacca on 10 September. She arrived at Whampoa on 29 September. Homeward bound, she crossed the Second Bar on 8 December, reached St Helena on 12 April 1802, and arrived at Long Reach on 14 June.

== Fate ==
In 1802 her owners sold Carnatic for breaking up.
