= French brig Gironde =

History

France
- Name: Gironde
- Namesake: Gironde
- Builder: Rochefort Dockyard
- Laid down: May 1793
- Launched: July 1793
- Renamed: 1794: Bec d'Ambez (for the Bec d'Ambès); 1795:Gironde (16 May 1795)
- Captured: 14 July 1800

Great Britain
- Name: HMS Gironde
- Acquired: 1800 by capture
- Fate: Sold 7 September 1801

General characteristics
- Class & type: Dédaigneuse-class gun-brig
- Tons burthen: 2592/94 bm
- Length: Overall: 91 ft 7 in (27.9 m); Keel: 72 ft 6 in (22.1 m)
- Beam: 25 ft 11 in (7.9 m)
- Depth of hold: 12 ft 1 3/4 in (3.7 m)
- Sail plan: Brig
- Complement: Privateer:141; British service:67 men
- Armament: French Navy: 3 × 24-pounder guns + 10 swivel guns.; Privateer: 16 guns; British service: 14 × 18-pounder carronades + 2 × 6-pounder chase guns

The French brig Gironde was launched at Rochefort in 1793 as a Dédaigneuse-class gun-brig of the French Navy. In 1797 she was struck from the lists and sold. She became a privateer operating out of Bordeaux. The British Royal Navy captured her in 1800 but never commissioned her; it sold her in 1801.

== French service ==
Gironde was renamed Bec d'Ambez in early 1794, but reverted to Gironde in May 1795. She took part in the Expédition de Cayenne in 1795. The French Navy struck her from the lists in 1797.

Gironde was sold at Bordeaux in 1797 and re-rigged. She then became a privateer.

In February 1798, Gironde captured Blinmont, of Wilmington, and took her into Bordeaux.

In November 1798 Lloyd's List reported that Gironde had captured several vessels near the Newfoundland Banks. The vessels were Clermont, Commerce, and George, and two other English vessels and one Portuguese. (Note: The slave ship Brooks recaptured Clermont as Brooks was returning to England after having delivered her slaves to Jamaica.)

Gironde captured George, Christopher Whipple, master, of New York, in August 1798. The British recaptured her on 23 September.

Commerce, Robert Caleff, master, Richard Calef, owner, had departed her homeport of Norfolk (Virginia), with a cargo of tobacco for London. Gironde, Captain Darigand, captured Commerce on 11 October off Newfoundland and took her into Santander, where she arrived on 8 November. There the French consul condemned vessel and cargo as English property; they were sold for 723,916 Spanish reals.

HMS Pomone recaptured, on 9 April 1799, an American schooner that Gironde had taken on 1 April. The schooner had been sailing from Caracas to Corunna with a cargo of cocoa and indigo.

On 17 April, Gironde captured Minerva, James Thomas, master, which was sailing in company with Nymphe, James Hardy, master, of Philadelphia. Both vessels were armed and they resisted before being forced to strike. Gironde brought them into Bordeaux.

In early 1800 Gironde captured the American ship Alknomac, Francis Miller, master, James and Edwin Gairdner, owners, and sent her into Lorient and Île de Ré. Following the Convention of 1800, the Conseil des Prises released Alknomac on 28 October 1801, with no damages.

HMS Fisgard captured the privateer Gironde on 28 July 1800. Captain T.B.Martin, of Fisgard, stated Gironde had been a particularly successful and active vessel. She had on board 53 English prisoners, the masters and crews of four vessels that she had captured.

The four vessels Gironde had captured whose crew were aboard her were:

- Swan sloop, Andrew Miller, Master, from Oporto and carrying wine; (Note: A Portuguese vessel recaptured Swan and sent her into Lisbon.)
- Countess of Lauderdale, Thomas Bennett, master, from Demerary, carrying sugar and cotton;
- Active brig, Benjamin Tucker, master, from Bermuda, carrying sugar and cotton; and
- Young William, Charles Bacon, master, returning from the South Sea's with a cargo of (whale) oil. (Note: Young William was recaptured and sent into Cork.)

== Royal Navy ==
Gironde arrived at Plymouth on 14 August 1800. After her arrival she was laid up. The Royal Navy named and registered her, but did not commission her.

The "Principal officers and commissioners of His Majesty's Navy" offered Gironde for sale on 24 August 1801. She sold 7 September for £705.
