= John Easty =

British marine and diarist

John Easty (fl. 1786–1793) was a marine in the New South Wales Marine Corps who served in the First Fleet that establish the British colony of New South Wales, Australia in 1788. Easty joined the marines no later than January 1784, and was appointed to Captain-Lieutenant Meredith's company on 4 November 1787. He arrived with the First Fleet on the Scarborough,

Easty was the lowest ranking author of the surviving journals of the First Fleet. He describes events on the voyage and in the colony in simple, irregular English. Incidents include accidents, crimes and punishments, and encounters with Aboriginal people. In March 1788 he received a flogging for bringing a female convict into the camp. Some of the journal is hearsay or was written later. Most of the events are reported in a matter of fact way, but Easty sometimes expresses his own strong opinions on matters such as the administration of the colony and religious beliefs. On 22 February 1790, he writes that he and a private in the 53rd Regiment of Foot, Thomas Brimage, signed and sealed their lasts wills and testaments to each other.

Easty returned to England on the Atlantic in December 1792, with the last detachment of marines to leave Sydney. Arthur Philip also returned home on this voyage. Easty rejoined his division at Portsmouth in May 1793. He left the marines and was employed by Waddington & Smith, grocers, in London in September 1794. In 1796 he petitioned the Admiralty for compensation promised for short rations in New South Wales.

A transcription of John Easty's journal was published in 1965.
