= Snake (1808 ship) =

Spanish merchant ship

History

United Kingdom
- Name: Snake
- Namesake: Snake
- Owner: 1808:John St Barbe; 1810:Burford; 1814:Masterman; 1818:Hodgson/Hudson
- Launched: 1802, Spain
- Acquired: 1808 by purchase of a prize
- Fate: Last listed in 1824

General characteristics
- Type: Brig
- Tons burthen: 207, or 210, or 218, or 225, or 230 (bm)
- Propulsion: Sail
- Complement: 46
- Armament: 1808:14 × 21&6-pounder cannons; 1808:4 × 6-pounder guns + 10 × 12-pounder carronades

Snake was probably launched in Spain in 1802 and was a prize that came into British hands in 1808. Her first owner employed her a privateer, but in 1810 sold her. Thereafter she sailed between London or Plymouth and the Cape of Good Hope (CGH), or between 1809 and 1816 in the Post Office Packet Service from Falmouth. Afterwards she sailed between London and South America. She was last listed in 1824.

== Origins ==
Between 1808 and 1814 both Lloyd's Register and the Register of Shipping give Snake's origin as a Spanish prize. However, in its issue for 1814, Lloyd's Register showed a change of origin from Spain to Île de France. The Register of Shipping followed suit in 1816. Neither register published in 1817. In 1818 and 1819 the Register of Shipping showed two vessels named Snake, one a Spanish prize and with other data from its pre-1816 listings, and the other a vessel with origin Île de France, and data broadly consistent with that in Lloyd's Register. In its volume for 1820, the Register of Shipping showed only the vessel with origin Île de France.

Hackman, in his listing of vessels that either served the British East India Company (EIC), or after 1814 sailed to the East Indies under license from the EIC, used as a source a volume of Lloyd's Register from after 1814. He then jumped to the conclusion that the British had captured her during the 1810 British invasion of Isle de France. The information from the registers shows that this assumption is incorrect. Furthermore, on 15 February 1811, Lloyd's List reported the names and tons (bm) of the vessels taken at Port Louis after the invasion. Although some vessels are of roughly the correct tonnage, no vessel is a close fit.

== Career ==
Snake first entered online British records in 1808 when Captain Thomas Cuzens acquired a letter of marque on 29 February 1808. The table below broadly outlines her subsequent career; it draws on both Lloyd's Register and the Register of Shipping, highlighting when either of the sources indicated a change from its previous information, or when the two sources differed. Snake also appears on occasion in Lloyd's List.

Snake initially was one of several temporary Post Office Packet Service packets sailing out of Falmouth, Cornwall. The Post Office hired the temporary packets during times of national emergency.

A source reports that Snake, of 210 tons (bm), built in Spain in 1802, served the Packet Service from 1809 to 1816. William Thompson was appointed her master on 11 November 1808. Robert Masterman replaced him on 11 December 1813, and Bowden replaced Masterman in 1815.

- On 13 January 1809 Lloyd's List reported that the "Snake packet", which had sailed for America on 1 February, had put back into Fowey with three feet of water in her hold. It is not possible to say with a high degree of confidence that this news item refers to the Snake brig of this article.
- On 20 October 1809, Snake arrived at Falmouth after a 70-day voyage from Rio de Janeiro with mails from the Brazils and news of a revolution at Buenos Aires. As Snake was coming off Cornwwall, a schooner privateer gave chase, but when Snake gained on her pursuer, the schooner turned her attention to a West Indiaman.
- On 3 November 1812, Lloyd's List reported that Snake, Burford, master, sailing from London to the Cape of Good Hope, had put into Plymouth. She was leaky and her cargo had had to be discharged.
- On 23 April 1813, Lloyd's List reported that Snake, Burford, master had had to put into Bahia leaky and had had to discharge her cargo. She had been on a voyage to Île de France when she had become leaky.
- On 20 May 1814 Lloyd's List reported that the "Snake Packet" had arrived from Surinam, and that on her way she had spoken several merchantmen.
- On 3 September 1816 Lloyd's List reported that the "Snake Packet" had arrived at Falmouth having spoken to a number of merchantmen.

Year	Master	Owner	Trade	Source& notes
1808	T. Cuzens	St. Barbe & Co.	London	Lloyd's Register (LR)
1809	T. Cuzens	St. Barbe & Co.	London cruiser (privateer)	Register of Shipping (RS)
1811	T. Cuzens; E.Burford	St. Barbe & Co.	London; London–Cape of Good Hope (CGH)	LR
1811	T.Cuzons _. Burford	J.St Barbe; Capt. & Co.	London cruiser London–CGH)	RS
1813	E.Burford	Burford & Co.	Plymouth–CGH	LR
1814	E.Burford	Burford & Co. Masterman	Plymouth–CGH; London packet	LR: First mention of Île de France as origin
1815	Masterman	Capt. & Co.	Falmouth packet	LR:
1816	Masterman; Bowden	Capt. & Co.	Falmouth packet	RS: Origin now Île de France
1816	Masterman; Bosden	Capt. & Co.	Falmouth packet	LR
1818	Edmondson; Warren	Hodgson	London–CGH	LR: "refused survey"
1818	E. Burford	Capt. & Co.	Plymouth–CGH	RS: Spanish prize; damage repaired 1812
1818	Edmonson; Waller	Hudson	London–CGH; London–South America	RS Seq.no.S524: Île de France
1819	Warren	Hodgson	London–CGH	LR: "refused to be surveyed"
1819	E. Burford	Capt. & Co.	Plymouth–CGH	RS
1819	Warner	Hudson	London–South America	RS
1820	Warner	Hudson	London–South America	RS
1824	Warren	Hodgson	London–CGH	LR: "refused to be surveyed"; last listing
1824	Warner	Hudson	London–South America	RS: last listing
