= Canada (1786 ship) =

History

Great Britain
- Builder: The King's Yard, Deptford
- Launched: 1779
- Fate: Sold c.1782

Great Britain
- Name: Adriatic
- Owner: John St Barbe
- Acquired: c.1782 by purchase
- Renamed: Canada c.1786
- Fate: On 6 June 1800, reported lost at South Georgia

General characteristics
- Tons burthen: 200, or 213 (bm)
- Propulsion: Sails
- Sail plan: Full-rigged ship
- Complement: 20
- Armament: 1794:4 × 3-pounder guns; 1798:10 × 6-pounder guns

Canada was launched at King's Yard in 1779, for the Royal Navy, which sold her circa 1782, at the end of the war. Her name while in Royal Navy service is unknown as of November 2022. John St Barbe purchased her and named her Adriatic, but renamed her Canada circa 1786. She made three seal hunting and whaling voyages between 1791 and 1799, under that name. On the first of these a French privateer captured her, but a British merchant ship recaptured her. She was lost at South Georgia in 1800, on her fourth voyage to the southern whale fishery.

== Career ==
Adriatic entered Lloyd's Register in 1783. Her master was K. St Barbe and her trade was London-Ancona. In 1786 her master was Cole, her name changed to Canada, and her trade became London-Quebec.

1st whaling voyage: Captain Alexander Muirhead left Britain on 15 July 1791. In August 1793, Lloyd's List reported that the French privateer Ajax, of Bordeaux, armed with twenty-six 12-pounder guns and having a crew of 286 men, had captured Canada at 27°0′N 35°0′W as Canada was returning from the South Seas fishery. (Note: Ajax français, or Ajax was commissioned in Bordeaux in 1793, under Captain Guillaume Gourrège. She was large (750 tons), and had a crew of 215 men. She was in commission from 17 April 1793, to 8 December 1793.) However, Prince of Wales, of Greenock, recaptured Canada and took her into Greenock. Muirhead then sailed her to Gravesend, Kent, arriving there on 28 October 1793. He returned with 15 tuns of sperm oil, seven tuns of whale oil, and 7000 seal skins.

Smyrna trade: Lloyd's Register for 1794, showed Canada, still with Muirhead, master, changing her trade from London-South Seas to London-Smyrna. This entry continued until 1797, when J. Cundall replaces Muirhead and her trade became London-Jamaica.

2nd whaling voyage: In 1798, Canada's owner changed from J. Cundall to J. Hill, and her master from J. Cundall to J. French. Her trade changed from London-Jamaica to London—South Seas. Also, her armament increased. Captain John French received a letter of marque on 11 June 1798. He left Britain on 25 June, for South Georgia, and returned on 16 July 1799.

== Loss ==
Canada, Captain Lewis Llewellyn, left Britain on 2 September 1799, bound for South Georgia. Canada arrived around March, and was lost soon after. The location of her wreck is unknown. On 6 June 1800, Lloyd's List reported Canada, French, master, lost at South Georgia. (Note: In a classic case of the tragedy of the commons, by this time the sealers had so depleted the stocks of seals that the trade ceased soon after.)
