= Clermont (1786 ship) =

History

Great Britain
- Builder: South Carolina, or New York
- Launched: 1786
- Fate: Last listed c. 1808

General characteristics
- Tons burthen: 257, or 278 (bm)

Clermont was launched at in 1786, or 1787 in South Carolina, or New York. She spent almost her entire career sailing between Britain and North America. In 1798 a French privateer captured her but a British slaver homeward-bound recaptured her. She was last listed around 1808, at which time she had been sailing as a London-based coaster

== Career ==
Clarement first appeared in Lloyd's Register (LR) in 1787.

Year	Master	Owner	Trade	Source
1787	Nicholson	Ritchson	New York–London	LR
1789	Nicholson; Colley	Ritchson	Liverpool–Virginia	LR
1793	N.Colley; G.Whippy	Ritchson	Liverpool–Virginia	LR
1794	G.Whippy; Stewart	Ritchson	Liverpool–Virginia	LR
1796	J.Stewart; M.Smith	Davison	London–North Carolina	LR; damage repaired 1796
1798	M.Smith; W.Bartholl	J.Davison	Liverpool–North Carolina	LR; damage repaired 1796

In November 1798 Lloyd's List reported that the French privateer Gironde had captured several vessels near the Newfoundland Banks. The vessels were Clermont, Commerce, and George, and two other English vessels and one Portuguese. The slave ship Brooks recaptured Clermont as Brooks was returning to England after having delivered her slaves to Jamaica. Clermont, Bartels, master, had been sailing from North Carolina when Brooks recaptured her.

Year	Master	Owner	Trade	Source
1799	W.Bartoll; J.Brown	J.Davison	Liverpool–North Carolina	LR; damage repaired 1796
1800	J.Brown; J.M'Farling	Adams&Co.	Liverpool–North Carolina; London–Teneriffe	LR; damage repaired 1796 & good repair 1800
1803	M'Farling; D.Denon	Adams&Co. J.Hogg	London-Workington	LR; damage repaired 1796 & good repair 1800
1805	D.Denyon	Hogg&Co.	Cork	LR; damage repaired 1796 & good repair 1800

== Fate ==
Clermont was last listed in LR in 1808 with data unchanged since 1805. She was listed in the Register of Shipping for a few more years, also with data unchanged from earlier years. The Register of Shipping showed her trade as "London coaster".
