= Anna Augusta (1801 ship) =

UK whaling ship 1801–1803

History

Spain
- Launched: 1793
- Captured: c.1800

United Kingdom
- Name: Anna Augusta
- Owner: 1801:John St Barbe; 1802:Captain B. Smith
- Acquired: c.1801 by purchase
- Fate: Wrecked January 1803

General characteristics
- Tons burthen: 128 (bm)
- Propulsion: Sail

Anna Augusta was a Spanish prize that John St Barbe purchased. In 1802-3 he sold her. Her captain (and owner) sailed her on a whaling voyage but she was wrecked in 1803 off Brazil on the outward leg.

== Career ==
Anna Augusta appeared in Lloyd's Register in 1801 with F. Christal, master, St Barbe, owner, and trade London–Aboukir. (Note: There is a mention of an Anna Augusta having left Cape Town on 11 November 1800 with a prisoner for Port Jackson, but there is no record of her arriving there. Although the name Anna Augusta appears unique, there is currently no information that would permit one to make a verifiable link between the vessels.) In March 1801 the British had fought a battle at Abukir as a prelude to their capture of Alexandria. Whether or not Anna Augusta sailed in support of the operations at Abu Qir is an open question.

Lloyd's Register for 1802 showed Anna Augusta's master changing from Christale to Smith, her owner changing from St Barbe to "Capt. & Co", and her trade from London–Aboukir to London–Southern fishery.

== Loss ==
On 29 January 1803 Smith and his crew arrived at Salvador, Bahia. Anna Augusta had been lost a few days earlier somewhat to the south. Smith sent his launches under the command of his mate to see what they could salvage. When they did not return, Smith took four men and a whaleboat on 9 February to go look for them; he found the launches with "considerable salvage". On their return the government seized the salvage to dispose of it.

Whales abounded off the coast and some merchants approached Smith to gather information about establishing whale fishing on the British method of boiling the whale oil on board the vessels. On 24 March Smith sailed to Lisbon aboard the King's brig, after having overcome many administrative obstacles.

Before Smith left, Thomas Lindley purchased Smith's right to the wreck. (Note: Lindley was the captain of the brig Packet, which the Portuguese authorities had seized. They also imprisoned him, his wife, and crew for some years. Lindley kept a journal that he later published.) Lindley then sent his former mate, William Barker, to examine it. The report was not clear so Lindley got permission from the governor at Salvador and found someone to sail him south. On 3 April Lindley found the wreck on a reef called Morrera, off the Ilha de Boipeda; (Note: This would appear to be Moreré (13.631642°S 38.888598°W).) The brig was so completely wrecked there was no hope of further salvage beyond a few trifles.

== Post script ==
Although Anna Augusta had been lost, Lloyd's List did not get the news, which also apparently did not reach the registers for some time. Lloyd's Register and the Register of Shipping carried stale data until 1807 or so, causing confusion in records.
