= Eurydice (1797 ship) =

History

Great Britain
- Name: Eurydice
- Namesake: Eurydice
- Owner: 1797:St Barbe; 1799:D. Butler; c.1815:Osborne
- Builder: John Troughton, Chester
- Launched: 14 March 1797
- Fate: Last listed 1820

General characteristics
- Tons burthen: 435, or 444 or (bm)
- Propulsion: Sail
- Complement: 1797:32; 1799:36; 1800:30; 1807:40; 1809:40
- Armament: 1797:10x6-pounder guns; 1799:16x6-pounder guns; 1800:16x6-pounder guns; 1807:18 × 9&12&18-pounder guns; 1809:18 × 9&12&18-pounder guns

Eurydice was launched in 1797. She made one voyage for the British East India Company (EIC). She then spent the rest of her career primarily as a West Indiaman, though with voyages elsewhere as well. Her last voyage appears to have been to India under a license from the EIC. She is no longer listed in the registries after 1820.

== Career ==
Eurydice was launched at Chester in 1797. She enters Lloyd's Register in 1797 with Muirhead, master, St Barbe, owner, and trade Liverpool–Bengal.

Captain Alexander Muirhead acquired a letter of marque on 7 April 1797. He sailed from Portsmouth on 1 July, bound for Bengal. Eurydice reached the Cape of Good Hope on 17 December and arrived at Calcutta on 16 April 1798. Homeward bound, she was at Kedgeree on 23 January 1799. She reached St Helena on 13 February and Crookhaven on 8 April. She arrived at Deptford on 19 April.

Even before Eurydice had returned from Bengal, St Barbe had sold her. Lloyd's Register for 1799 has the following entry:

Year	Master	Owner	Trade
1799	Muirhead; T.Roach	St Barbe; Butler	Liverpool–India; London–Jamaica

Captain Thomas Roach received a letter of marque on 24 August 1799. When Captain Charles Spencer Compton replaced Roach, Compton acquired three letters of marque: 17 September 1800, 1 July 1807, and 5 May 1809.

On 22 July 1806, Lloyd's List reported that Arethusa, Chivers, master, had been condemned at Surinam and that Eurydice, Compton, master, would carry her cargo back to England.

Year	Master	Owner	Trade
1800	J. Roach	D. Butler	London–Barbados
1805	C. Compton	D. Butler	London–Barbados

On 24 February 1809, Lloyd's List reported that Eurydice, Compton, master, had arrived at London from Surinam, having sailed from there on 13 January. She had parted on the 17th from the other vessels with whom she had left Surinam. She then ran into bad weather and had to throw her guns and 90 bags of coffee overboard to lighten her.

Year	Master	Owner	Trade
1810	C. Compton	Baring & Co.	London–Surinam
1815	J.Corser; L.Dicion	Butler	London–Malta; London–Bermuda
1816	A. Main	D. Butler	Liverpool–New York
1818	C. Young	Osborne	London–Bengal
1820	C. Young	Osborne	London–Bengal

== Fate ==
Lloyd's Register and the Register of Shipping both last listed Eurydice in 1820.
