= Sandown (1788 ship) =

History

France
- Launched: 1781
- Fate: Sold 1788?

Great Britain
- Name: Sandown
- Owner: 1788: John St Barbe; 1792:Cameron; 1795:F. Smith
- Acquired: c.1788 (by purchase?)
- Fate: Last listed in 1798

General characteristics
- Tons burthen: 138 (after lengthening), or 150, or 151 (bm)
- Length: 82 ft (25.0 m)
- Beam: 21 ft (6.4 m)
- Complement: 20, or 22-28
- Armament: 6 × 4-pounder guns + 2 swivel guns
- Notes: three masts and two decks

Sandown is notable because when in 1793-94 she carried slaves from Sierra Leone to Jamaica, her master, Captain Samuel Gamble, kept a detailed log with profuse illustrations. This has been published in a transcribed and annotated form. (Note: For reviews of Mouser's transcription see Behrendt, and Burnard.) It is one of only a few journals and logbooks from the British slave trade.

Sandown entered Lloyd's Register in 1789, as a vessel built in France in 1781, lengthened in 1787, and surveyed in 1787. Her owner was John St Barbe, and her master was W. Snow. Her trade was London–Turkey. In 1791, her trade was London–Marseilles.

Lloyd's Register for 1793 shows her master changing from W. Snow to S. Gambell, her owner from J. St Barbe to Cameron, and her trade from London–Straits [of Gibraltar] to Cork–Africa.

A group of London investors had chartered Sandown for £125 per month to sail to Africa, acquire captives, and then deliver them to the West Indies. Joseph and Angus Kennedy represented the owners, and one sailed aboard Sandown as supercargo. When she arrived in the West Indies, the contract would end, with the owners' agent taking over the ship, captives, and cargo.

Captain Samuel Gamble received a letter of marque on 21 March 1793, i.e., before he sailed to West Africa. Sandown sailed from London on 7 April 1793, and started gathering captives on 15 September, at Sierra Leone, though she primarily gathered her captives at Rio Nuñez. (Note: Huddleston has a detailed account of Sandown's experience on the coast, based on Gamble's journal.)

On 14 January 1794, the enslaved people on board staged an uprising that left eight or ten captives dead before it was suppressed.

On 27 March 1794, Sandown left Africa and on 13 May, she arrived at Jamaica. She had embarked 232 slaves and she disembarked 212, for a loss rate of 8.6%.

Sandown left Jamaica on 27 July. On 11 October, she arrived at Liverpool.

She had started her voyage with 22 crew members and added six before she commenced gathering captives. Five died on the voyage from England to Africa, five died while she was in Africa, and one died on the voyage from Africa to Jamaica. On her way she stopped at Barbados where a number of crew members deserted, forcing her to limp into Jamaica with only six crew members.

Lloyd's Register for 1795, showed Sandown's master changing from Gamble to F. Smith, and her owner from Cameron to Captain & Co. Also, her trade changed from London–Africa to London–Cork. She was last listed in 1798 with Smith, master and owner, and trade London–Cork.
