= Orpheus (1794 ship) =

History

Great Britain
- Name: Orpheus
- Namesake: Orpheus
- Owner: 1794:John St Barbe & Co., London; 1802:J. Mills; 1817:J. Findlay; 1819:J. Terrington; 1826 on:Ambiguous
- Builder: John Troughton, Chester
- Launched: 4 January 1794
- Fate: Last listed in 1837 but possibly sold in 1828 for breaking up

General characteristics
- Tons burthen: 381, or 38174/94, or 40136/94, (Note: Based on calculation using the dimensions from the records in the British Library. This burthen is inconsistent with the burthen as given in the same records, and with any of the burthens that Hackman reports.)or 406, or 413, or 41652/94, or 417 (bm)
- Length: Overall: 111 ft 3 in (33.9 m); Keel:89 ft 6 in (27.3 m), or 89 ft 7 in (27.3 m), or 114 ft 0 in (34.7 m)
- Beam: 28 ft 3 1/2 in (8.6 m), or 28 ft 4 in (8.6 m), or 29 ft 0 in (8.8 m), or 28 ft 0 in (8.5 m),
- Depth of hold: 12 ft 5 in (3.8 m), or 12 ft 6 in (3.8 m)
- Propulsion: Sail
- Complement: 1794:36; 1798:30; 1809:35
- Armament: 1794:8 × 6-pounder guns; 1798:8 × 6-pounder guns; 1809:10 × 6&12-pounder guns; 1809:8 × 6-pounder guns + 2 × 9-pounder guns "of the New Construction" + 6 × 12-pounder carronades
- Notes: Two decks

Orpheus was launched at Chester in 1794. She made two voyages for the British East India Company (EIC). She also served briefly as a transport in two military campaigns, and traded with the West and East Indies. She was last listed in 1838 but may well have been sold for breaking up in 1828.

== Career ==
Orpheus enters Lloyd's Register in 1794 with G. Bowen, master, St Barbe & Co., owner, and trade London—India.

EIC voyage #1 (1794–1795): Prior to her EIC voyage apparently Young measured her. Captain George Bowen acquired a letter of marque on 29 April 1794. Captain Bowen sailed from Plymouth on 22 June 1794, bound for Bengal and Madras. She arrived at Calcutta on 16 November. Homeward bound, she was at Saugor on 30 January 1795 and Madras on 4 March. She reached St Helena on 24 May, but then sailed back to Simons Bay, which she reached on 26 June. She then reached St Helena on 11 July. She returned to Simons Bay on 5 August, and the Cape on 19 September. The to-and-fro done, Orpheus reached St Helena on 8 October and arrived at the Downs on 23 November.

The reason for the to-and-fro was that Orpheus supported the invasion of the Cape Colony. The EIC charged the British government for demurrage for the delay in her homeward voyage, insurance for the extension, freight for the transshipment of her goods on other vessels, and cost and freight for sugar transferred to the British Navy. The total amounted to £6,228 18s .

One report has Batson, Limehouse, building Orpheus in 1798 for Cristall & Co. However, EIC records in the British Library simply have Bateson repairing her.

EIC voyage #2 (1798–1800): Captain John Cristall acquired a letter of marque on 30 July 1798. Captain Cristall sailed from Portsmouth on 4 October 1798, bound for Madras and Bengal. Orpheus reached the Cape on 14 January 1799, Madras on 9 May, and Coringa on 17 June. She arrived at Calcutta on 13 July. Homeward bound, she was at Culpee (an anchorage towards Calcutta, and just below Diamond Harbour on 3 October and Saugor on 23 October. She reached the Cape on 15 January 1800 and St Helena on 12 February. She then arrived at the Downs on 30 May.

After her return Orpheus sailed as a London-based transport. However, she leaves the body of the 1802 Lloyd's Register, and reappears in the supplemental pages with J. Beavens, master, Mill & Co., owner, and sailing between London and Jamaica. Lloyd's List reported on 28 January 1803 that Orpheus, Bevans, master, had to put into Bearhaven because of the loss of her maintopsail yard. she had been sailing from Cork to Jamaica at the time.

The 1809 volume of Lloyd's Register shows the master of Orpheus changing from R. Groves to T. Findlay. Captain Thomas Findlay acquired a letter of marque on 19 September 1809.

In 1813, the British East India Company (EIC) had lost its monopoly on the trade between India and Britain. British ships were then free to sail to India or the Indian Ocean under a licence from the EIC. Orpheus's owners applied for a licence on 18 October 1814, and received the licence the next day.

Circa 1817 Mills sold Orpheus to Captain Findlay. She is listed in the 1818 volume of Lloyd's Register with T. Findlay as master and owner, and with trade London—Bombay. The 1819 Lloyd's Register shows the owner of Orpheus as J. Terrington, and trade London—Bengal.

In 1819–1820 Orpheus served as a transport in the Royal Navy-EIC expedition against the Joasmi pirates at Ras-al-Khaimah.

On 5 May 1826 Orpheus, R. Duff, master, Terrington, owner, sailed for New South Wales. She was at Rio de Janeiro on 22 June and arrived at Sydney on 16 September. She brought some 213 passengers, comprising the men of the three New South Wales Veterans Companies, and their wives and children. (Note: The New South Wales Veterans Companies was a military unit of about 150 men. It was made up of veterans who agreed to join what would be a garrison unit in New South Wales. After the unit arrived in Sydney in 1826 it performed guard and other light duties until it was disbanded in 1833.)

| Year | Master | Owner | Trade | Source |
|---|---|---|---|---|
| 1828 | Dutt | Findlay & Co. | London—Van Dieman's Land | Lloyd's Register |
| 1828 | Duff | J. Mills & Co. | London—New South Wales | Register of Shipping |

== Fate ==
One report has Orpheus being sold in 1828 for breaking up, and the Register of Shipping no longer lists her after 1828. However, she apparently continued to sail under a slightly new name.

Lloyd's Register for 1829 has Orphew, Findlay & Co., owner, built at Chester in 1795, sailing between Cork and Antwerp with Duff as master.

Lloyd's List reported on 11 March 1828 that Orpheus, Duff, master, had gotten into Antwerp after grounding on the Van Warden Bank. Then on 9 May, it reported that she had been brought off the Goodwin Sands and brought into Dover.

The information for Orphew continues unchanged until 1834. From 1834 to 1838 there is an entry for Orpheus, of 417 tons (bm), J.F. Duff, master, and home port London. The entries contain no other information.

It is quite possible that her owner(s) sold her after the mishap on the Goodwin Sands and that all the subsequent listings in Lloyd's Register represent stale information.
