= Armenia (1796 ship) =

Merchant vessel launched at Calcutta

History

Great Britain
- Name: Armenia
- Owner: Walker
- Builder: Calcutta
- Launched: 1796, or 1795
- Fate: Captured 1800

General characteristics
- Tons burthen: 518, or 51870/94, or 519(bm)
- Armament: 12 × 3-pounder + 4 × 6-pounder guns
- Notes: Teak-built

Armenia was a merchant vessel launched at Calcutta in 1796. Captain Thomas Meek (or Meik), was her only captain. In 1799 the East India Company (EIC) took her up for a voyage to Britain. A French privateer captured her on her return voyage to India.

== Early career ==
She made one trip to Britain for the EIC. On that trip she left St Helena on 6 July in the company of the East Indiamen Tellicherry, Triton, and Barwell, and under escort by the 18-gun Cornwallis. (Note: HMS Cornwallis was an 18-gun brig that did not enter into Admiralty records. A few passing mentions in other contexts are the sole indicators of her existence. She appears to have been purchased at the Cape of Good Hope. Lieutenant Richard Byron was appointed to command her in March 1798 and to Commander on 22 June. He sailed her "with dispatches" to Britain, where she was paid off and seemingly never returned to service.) Armenia arrived in Britain on 27 September.

Armenia was admitted to the Registry in Great Britain on 16 November 1799. Armenia appears in the 1800 issue of the Register of Shipping with T. Meek, master, and Walker, owner, and trade London−India.

== Capture and postscript ==
The French privateer Clarisse captured Armenia on 5 July 1800 and sent her into Mauritius. Clarisse was armed with 16 guns and had a crew of 180 men under the command of Captain François-Thomas Le Même. Armenia encountered Clarisse at 7°30′S 79°30′E; after a five-hour chase Clarisse caught up with Armenia and combat ensued. Captain Meik resisted, but after about 40 minutes of exchanging fire he stuck. Armenia had lost her Third Officer killed and six men wounded, one of whom died later; Clarisse appeared to have had three men killed. Another report has Clarisse's casualties as seven killed and 20 wounded.

Le Même took Captain Meik (or Meek), his second officer, and the crew on board the privateer. The four passengers, one of them a woman, and the wounded remained on Armenia and reached Mauritius on 17 July, where the French government provided good care. (Note: The Isle de France Gazette noted the arrival of Arménien, Captain Fabre, on the 17th after a 10-day transit.) The passengers were then able to return to India in about a month later.

Meik and his crew were apparently left on the Seychelles. On 29 October Meik, his crew, and two midshipmen and 15 men from HMS Adamant and HMS Lancaster were put in a small boat of 35 tons bound to Colombo. (Note: Although the account offers no explanation for the source of the men from the two Royal Navy ships, the numbers suggest they were prize crews on vessels that the French had recaptured.) On 9 November, at about midnight, the boat ran into rocks in the Maldives. Five of the navy men, three of Armenia's crew, and five Frenchmen died in an attempt to reach shore on a makeshift raft. The survivors took two Maldivian boats and set sail again. Meik arrived at Cochin on 4 December. Mr. Maddox, a midshipman from Lancaster, died of sickness on the passage. At the time of Meek's letter (6 January 1801) reporting his trials, the second boat, which also had some navy personnel aboard, had not been heard from.

On 20 July 1801, the members of the Bengal Phoenix Insurance Society presented Captain Meik with an elegant, engraved sword worth 1600 sicca rupees. (Note: The sicca rupee weighed 192 grains and contained 176 grains of pure silver.) Then on 24 September, the Calcutta Insurance Company voted a donation of £150 to the mother of Armenia's Second Officer, £100 to the Steward, who distinguished himself in the action, and 500 sicca rupees to establish an annuity fund for the two seamen who suffered in the action.
