= Atlantic (1783 ship) =

History

Great Britain
- Name: Atlantic
- Owner: John St Barbe & Co., London
- Operator: East India Company, 1797–1799
- Builder: Swansea, Wales
- Launched: 1783
- Fate: Not listed in 1810

General characteristics
- Tons burthen: 422 or 451 (bm)
- Sail plan: Ship rig
- Complement: 30-34
- Armament: 1796: 12 × 6-pounder guns; 1799: 16 × 6 & 9-pounder guns; 1803: 6 × 18-pounder carronades

Atlantic was launched in 1783. She made one voyage from England to Australia in 1791 carrying convicts. Later, she made one voyage for the East India Company (EIC). Subsequently she sailed to Smyrna, Surinam, and Gibraltar, before she disappeared from records in 1810.

== Career ==
In 1783 she was under the command of Captain Edward Redman. Under his command, she traded between London and Jamaica.

In 1789 Atlantic was under the command of Captain Muirhead. She was trading between London and Archangel.

=== Convict transport ===
Under the command of Archibald Armstrong, master, Atlantic departed Portsmouth on 27 March 1791 as part of the third fleet, and arrived on 20 August 1791 in Port Jackson, New South Wales. She transported 220 male convicts, 18 of whom died during the voyage. The Naval Agent on board was Lieutenant Richard Bowen, and the surgeon was James Thompson.

Provisions in the colony were in short supply. Governor Phillip, therefore, took the Atlantic into the service as a naval transport. She left Port Jackson on 26 October 1791, bound for Bengal.

Atlantic returned to Port Jackson from Calcutta on 20 June 1792. She then made a return voyage to Norfolk Island, arriving back in Port Jackson on 30 Sep 1792. On 11 December 1792 she departed Port Jackson for England. She was carrying the retiring governor Arthur Phillip, accompanied by the Aboriginal Australians Bennelong and his friend Yemmerrawanne. Also on board were the last of the First Fleet New South Wales Marine Corps detachment, including diarist John Easty.

=== East India Company ===
In 1795 Thomas Probeart was Atlantic's captain, and her occupation was listed as a transport sailing out of London.

Then Atlantic sailed to India for the East India Company. War with France had commenced in 1793, and during her employment with the EIC and subsequently she sailed under a letter of marque, which gave her the right to act offensively against the French, should the opportunity arise, and not just defensively. That is, the letter authorized her to capture French vessels. Probeart received a letter of marque on 26 December 1796.

Captain Probert [sic], sailed past Dungeness on 5 February 1797, bound for Madras, Penang, and Bengal. On 2 May Atlantic reached the Cape, and on 20 June Madras. From there she sailed to Penang, which she reached on 23 August. She was at Penang on 27 September and also on 12 October.

This to-and-fro was a consequence of the EIC and the Royal Navy preparing an expedition against Manila that then did not take place. (A peace treaty with Spain ended the plan.) Atlantic's owners charged the EIC £7,600 7s 2d for her services as a transport.

Atlantic left Penang on 26 November. She reached Madras on 11 December, and Colombo on 8 January 1798. From there she sailed on to Calcutta, which she reached on 28 February. Homeward-bound, she left Calcutta, passing Kedgeree on 1 November. She reached the Cape on 19 January 1799, and St Helena on 16 February. She arrived at Long Reach on 17 July.

=== Subsequent career ===
In 1799 Atlantic's captain was Alexander Muirhead, who received a letter of marque on 31 August 1799. Earlier that year, on 19 April, he was captain of the Eurydice, which was in Bengal with a cargo for the EIC.

Under Muirhead, Atlantic traded between London and Smyrna. After Smyrna, she sailed to Surinam.

In 1803 Captain Curzans replaced Muirhead and sailed Atlantic to Gibraltar. After the outbreak of the Napoleonic Wars, Sampson Baker became Atlantic's captain; he received a letter of marque on 8 June 1803. (Note: Lloyd's Register still showed Curzans as captain through 1809. Between 1796 and 1801, Sampson had been the captain of Tellicherry, a vessel of 465 tons (bm) belonging to John St Barbe, when she made three voyages to Bengal as an extra ship for the EIC.)

Atlantic was no longer listed in Lloyd's Register in 1810, or in the Register of Shipping in 1811.
