= Walmer Castle (ship) =

Several vessels have been named Walmer Castle for Walmer Castle:

- Walmer Castle (1796 EIC ship) was an East Indiaman. She made nine voyages for the British East India Company. She then was a transport and was finally broken up in 1821.
- Walmer Castle (1836 ship) was launched at London as an East Indiaman. Until 1855 she sailed primarily to India, though she made at least two voyages carrying emigrants to Australia.
- Walmer Castle (1855 ship) was launched at Sunderland. She sailed between England and China, India, Australia, and Java. A fire on Christmas Day 1877 destroyed her.
- SS Walmer Castle (1872 ship), of 2,450 GRT, was launched at Glasgow. She became SS Valencia (1880), and then SS Gaw Quan Sia (1889). On 16 December 1889 she collided with SS Leerdam (ex-Nederland). Both vessels sank.
- RMS Walmer Castle was a passenger ship for Union-Castle Line, launched on 6 July 1901 and completed 20 February 1902. The British government requisitioned her in 1917 and she then served as a troop ship in the North Atlantic. She returned to mercantile service after the war and was scrapped in 1932.
- MV Walmer Castle was launched 17 September 1936 and completed 30 November as a cargo ship for Union-Castle Line. During WWII she became a convoy rescue ship. She was with Convoy OG 74 on 13 September 1941 when bombs from a German Condor bomber struck her. The damage to Walmer Castle was so extensive she had to be sunk by the convoy escorts.

== See also ==
- HMS Walmer Castle was a Castle-class corvette constructed for the British Royal Navy during the Second World War. Before completion, the ship was transferred to the Royal Canadian Navy and renamed HMCS Leaside. The corvette served as an ocean convoy escort during the war and was sold for mercantile use following it. The ship was purchased for use as a passenger ship and renamed Coquitlam, then in 1958, Glacier Queen. In 1970 Glacier Queen was acquired for use as a floating hotel in Alaska. The ship sank in 1978 and was raised and scuttled in Alaskan waters in 1979.
