= Orpheus (1818 ship) =

History

United Kingdom
- Name: Orpheus
- Namesake: Orpheus
- Owner: 1818:John St Barbe & Co., London; 1820:Nichols & Co.; 1825:B. Ford; 1827:Carter
- Builder: "Sthton" - possibly Southampton
- Launched: 1818
- Fate: Wrecked 28 October 1827

General characteristics
- Tons burthen: 137, 140, or 141 (bm)
- Propulsion: Sail
- Notes: Two decks

Orpheus was a merchant ship launched in 1818. She spent most of her career trading between London and Smyrna. A new owner circa 1827 started sailing towards Valparaiso and Lima. Orpheus wrecked in October 1827.

== Career ==
Orpheus enters Lloyd's Register in 1819.

Year	Master	Owner	Trade
1819	Christall	St Barbe	London; London—Smyrna
1820	Christall	Nichols & Co.	London—Smyrna

On 11 and 12 November 1823 Constantinople suffered a severe gale that did material damage to the shipping in the port. Orpheus, Ford, master, suffered so much damage that she required important repairs.

Year	Master	Owner	Trade
1825	B. Ford	Capt. & Co.	Plymouth—Smyrna
1825	B. Ford	Capt. & Co.	Plymouth—Smyrna
1827	B. Ford; Carter	Capt. & Co.	Plymouth—Smyrna; London—Cape Horn

The Register of Shipping for 1828 gave Orpheus's master and owner as Carter, and her trade as London—Lima.

== Fate ==
On 1 February 1828 Lloyd's List reported that Orpheus, Carter, master, had gone to pieces off the coast of South America. The mate and two crew drowned, but the master, his wife and child, and two passengers arrived at Montevideo. The wreck occurred on 28 October 1827 off the coast of South America. HMS Cadmus rescued the survivors.
