= French frigate Libre =

Romaine-class French Navy frigate

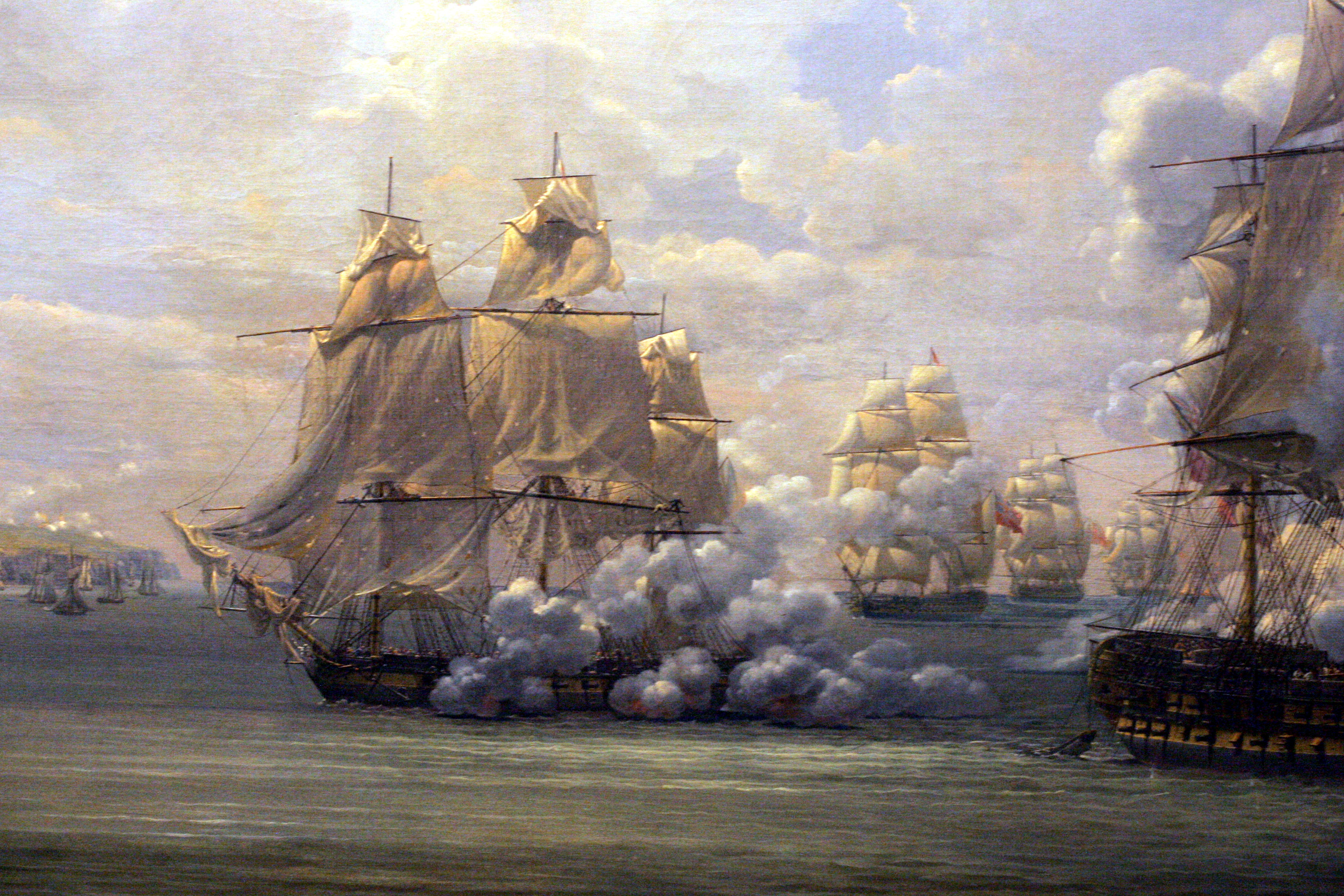
- Poursuivante, sister-ship of Libre

History

France
- Name: Libre
- Laid down: September 1794
- Launched: 10 February 1796
- In service: January 1798
- Captured: 24 December 1805

General characteristics
- Class & type: Romaine-class frigate
- Displacement: 700 tonnes
- Length: 45.5 m (149 ft 3 in)
- Beam: 11.8 m (38 ft 9 in)
- Draught: 5 m (16 ft 5 in)
- Propulsion: Sail
- Armament: 24 × 24-pounder guns; 16 × 8-pounder guns
- Armour: Timber

Libre was a Romaine-class frigate of the French Navy. She was commissioned in 1800 and remained in active service until the Royal Navy captured her in 1805.

== Career ==
Libre was built at Le Havre, launched in 1796, and commissioned there on 24 December 1800 under Commander Bourdet. She sailed from Le Havre in March 1801 in the company of Indienne towards Cherbourg, then Cádiz and A Coruña, before cruising to Saint-Domingue and into the North Sea.

From September to December 1803 she was stationed at the mouth of the River Meuse. (Note: Bourdet had been promoted to captain and appointed to command the naval station of Meuse.)

On 24 December 1805, HMS Egyptienne and HMS Loire captured her six leagues (29 km) north-west of Rochefort, near the "Phare de Baleines" (Lighthouse of the Whales) on the Île de Ré. Libre suffered two killed and 18 wounded, including her captain, Commander Deschorches. Loire had no casualties but Egyptienne had eight men wounded, one mortally.

By British report, Libre was armed with twenty-four 18-pounders (which had replaced her originally-planned 24-pounders), six 36-pounder obusiers and ten 9-pounder guns. Libre was badly damaged and lost her masts soon after she struck. Loire then took her in tow and reached Plymouth with her on 4 January 1806. The British did not take Libre into Royal Navy service.
