= Thames (1807 ship) =

History

United Kingdom
- Name: Thames
- Namesake: River Thames
- Builder: Howden
- Launched: 1807
- Captured: 1 July 1813

General characteristics
- Tons burthen: 312, or 314, or 315 (bm)
- Complement: 20
- Armament: 1809: 12 × 12-pounder; 1813: 2 × 9-pounder chase guns + 12 × 12-pounder carronades

Thames was launched in 1807 in Howden. She first sailed as a West Indiaman, and later traded with Brazil. Privateers captured her twice. The first time the British Royal Navy was able swiftly to recapture her. The second time Thames's American captor sent her into Portland, Maine after a single ship action.

== Career ==
Although Thames was launched at Howdon in 1807, she did not appear in the Register of Shipping or Lloyd's Register (LR) until 1809.

Captain Jame Grieve acquired a letter of marque on 18 May 1809.

Year	Master	Owner	Trade	Source
1809	J.Grieve	Hurry & Co.	London–Barbados	Register of Shipping (RS)
1809	J.Grieve	Hurry & Co.	Liverpool–Brazil	LR

In January 1810 Lloyd's List reported that HMS Parthian had recaptured Thames, Greeve, master and sent her into Fowey. Thames had been returning to Liverpool from the Braziles when a French privateer had captured her.

Year	Master	Owner	Trade	Source
1810	J.Grieve; G.Lyons	Hurry & Co.	London–Brazils; London–Jamaica	LR
1813	G.Lyons	Hurry & Co.	Liverpool-Brazils	LR

== Fate ==
Thames was scheduled to leave Maranham on 30 April 1813 for Liverpool, in company with Paris, Harrison, master, and Watson, Grieg, master. The privateer Yankee captured Thames off Ireland; later, Thames was reported to have arrived in Portland, Maine on 1 July.

Another account has Yankee, Captain Elisha Snow, capturing Thames on 30 May after an action of one hour. Thames had 14 guns, but only 20 men. On 3 June, Yankee stopped a Portuguese brig from New York. Snow put Thames's captain and crew aboard the brig after they had promised not to fight against the United States again.

Yankee was on her third cruise. Thames was carrying 287 bales of cotton, and vessel and cargo sold for $110,000. Each share in her voyage received $173.54. Another account reports that Thames was carrying 180 tons of cotton, and was also carrying specie. The account put the value of the capture at $180,000.

In 1813 Yankee captured two vessels named Thames, the Thames of this article and Thames. On this cruise Yankee captured more than six vessels belonging to Liverpool, as well as a number of others. She might have captured more, but on 8 October, she only captured Paris, Harrison, master, of six gun and 11 men, after a single ship action that left both damaged, forcing Yankee to have to go into port to repair. HMS Ringdove later recaptured Paris.
