= Romaine-class frigate =

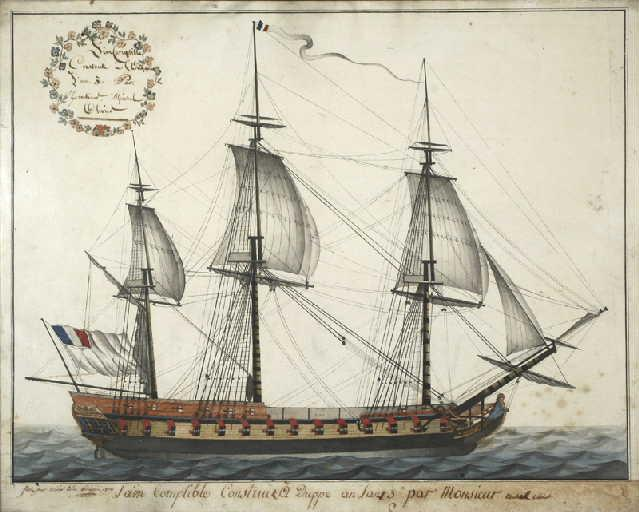
- Portrait of Incorruptible by Olivier Colin.

Class overview
- Name: Romaine
- Builders: Le Havre (3); Dieppe (2); Dunkirk (2); Lorient (2)
- Operators: French Navy; Royal Navy
- Preceded by: Forte class
- Succeeded by: Surveillante class
- Completed: 9

General characteristics
- Type: Frigate
- Displacement: 700 tonnes
- Length: 45.5 m (149 ft 3 in)
- Beam: 11.8 m (38 ft 9 in)
- Draught: 5 m (16 ft 5 in)
- Complement: 250 men
- Armament: 34-42 guns: 24 24-pounder long guns; (all subsequently re-armed with 18-pounders); 10 or 12 8-pounder long guns; 1 12-inch mortar (subsequently removed); 4 36-pounder Obusiers de vaisseau were added in most ships
- Armour: Timber

The Romaine class was a class of nine frigates of the French Navy, designed in 1794 by Pierre-Alexandre Forfait. They were originally designated as "bomb-frigates" (Fr. frégate-bombarde) and were intended to carry a main armament of twenty 24-pounder guns and a 12-inch mortar mounted on a turntable in front of the mizzen mast. Experience quickly led to the mortars being removed (in most vessels they were never fitted), and the 24-pounders were replaced by 18-pounder guns. The ships also featured a shot furnace, but they proved impractical, dangerous to the ships themselves, and were later discarded. A further eleven ships ordered to this design in 1794 were not built, or were completed to altered designs.

Two vessels of the class became breakwaters in less than 15 years after their construction. The British Royal Navy captured three. One was lost at sea. None had long active duty careers. All-in-all, these ships do not appear to have been successful with the initially intended armament, but proved of adequate performance once their heavy mortar was removed and their 24-pounders replaced with 18-pounder long guns.

== Vessels in class ==
- Romaine

Builder: Le Havre
Begun: March 1794
Launched: 25 September 1794
Completed: December 1794
Fate: Condemned 1804.

- Immortalité

Builder: Lorient
Begun: May 1794
Launched: 7 January 1795
Completed: February 1795
Fate: Captured by the British Navy on 20 October 1798, becoming HMS Immortalite.

- Impatiente

Builder: Lorient
Begun: May 1794
Launched: 12 March 1795
Completed: May 1795
Fate: Wrecked off Cape Clear on 29 December 1796.

- Incorruptible

Builder: Dieppe
Begun: March 1794
Launched: 20 May 1795
Completed: December 1795
Fate: Deleted 1815.

- Revanche

Builder: Dieppe
Begun: March 1794
Launched: 31 August 1795
Completed: December 1795
Fate: Deleted 1818 or 1819.

- Libre

Builder: Le Havre
Begun: August 1794
Launched: 11 February 1796
Completed: January 1798
Fate: Captured by the British Navy in December 1805, but not added to the British Navy.

- Comète

Builder: Le Havre
Begun: September 1794
Launched: 11 March 1796
Completed: January 1798
Fate: Converted to a breakwater 1808, taken to pieces 1810.

- Désirée

Builder: Dunkirk
Begun: February 1794
Launched: 23 April 1796
Completed: December 1798
Fate: Captured by the British Navy on 8 July 1800, becoming HMS Desiree.

- Poursuivante

Builder: Dunkirk
Begun: February or April 1794
Launched: 24 May 1796
Completed: April 1798
Fate: Condemned 1805, made a breakwater 1806 or 1807.

Twenty ships of this type were originally included in the shipbuilding programme placed between October 1794 and April 1794, but several appear not to have been begun. Apart from the nine listed above, a tenth vessel, Furieuse, was begun at Cherbourg in March 1795 to the same design but was completed as a vessel of Forfait's earlier Seine class. An eleventh, Pallas (originally named Première) was begun at Saint-Malo in November 1795 to a much modified design; a twelfth, Fatalité was also ordered in October 1793 at Saint-Malo, but was cancelled in 1796, as was a further vessel, Nouvelle, ordered in 1794 at Lorient. Another vessel, Guerrière, was begun at Cherbourg in 1796 to this design but was also completed to a modified design.
