= Walder =

Walder is a surname and given name. Notable people with the name include:

Surname:

- Albert Walder (born 1957), Italian cross country skier
- Andrew G. Walder (born 1953), American political sociologist
- Chaim Walder (1968–2021), Israeli children's writer who killed himself after dozens of sexual assault allegations
- Chris Walder (1900–1997), Dutch footballer
- Christian Walder (born 1991), Austrian alpine skier
- Dave Walder (born 1978), rugby player
- David Walder (1928–1978), British politician
- Erick Walder (born 1971), American long jumper
- Fernand Walder (born 1946), Belgian volleyball player
- Francis Walder (1906–1997), Belgian writer and soldier
- George Walder, American football player and coach
- Harald Walder (born 1973), Austrian snowboarder
- Ingemar Walder (born 1978), Austrian snowboarder
- Jay Walder, American transport executive in New York
- Katie Walder (born 1982), American actress
- Marc Walder (born 1965), Swiss journalist and tennis player
- Pius Walder (1952–1982), Austrian lumberjack and poacher
- Russel Walder (born 1959), American jazz oboist
- Samuel Walder (1879–1946), Australian politician and businessman

Given name:

- Walder Frey, a fictional character in George R.R. Martin's A Song of Ice and Fire
- Charles Walder Grinstead (1860–1930), English tennis player
- John Walder Dunlop Holder (born 1949), Barbadian Anglican archbishop

== See also ==
- Wald (disambiguation)
- Waldberg (disambiguation)
- Walter (disambiguation)
- Wilder (disambiguation)
