= Malvina (1796 ship) =

History

United Kingdom
- Name: Malvina
- Namesake: Malvina
- Launched: 1796
- Fate: Captured 1804

General characteristics
- Tons burthen: 135, or 137, or 145 (bm)
- Propulsion: Sail
- Complement: 20
- Armament: 1801: 10 × 4-pounder guns + 2 × 6-pounder carronades; 1803:6 × 3&4-pounder guns + 2 × 6-pounder carronades + 4 swivel guns

Malvina was launched in 1796 in the United States. She first appeared in British on-line sources in 1800 as a West Indiaman. She made one voyage as a slave ship in the triangular trade in enslaved persons between May 1803 and late 1804, when she was captured.

== Career ==
Malvina, Christie, master, had arrived in the Clyde on 31 July 1800 from Charleston.

Year	Master	Owner	Trade	Notes & Source
1800	Christie	M'Neil	Greenock–Jamaica	LR
1801	B. Christie	M'Neil & Co.	Greenock–Jamaica	Register of Shipping (RS)
1801	V. Christie; J.Carr	M'Neil; Wilson	Greenock–Jamaica; London–Africa	LR
1802	J.Carr	J.Wilson	London–Africa	RS
1802	J.Carr	J.Wilson	London–Africa	LR America
1803	J.Carr; J. Watts	J.Wilson	London–Africa	LR

In January 1803 Lloyd's List reported that Malvina, Car, master, was at Goree.

Captain James Watt(s) acquired a letter of marque on 30 May 1803. He sailed from London 14 June 1803. In 1803, 99 vessels sailed from British ports, bound for voyages transporting enslaved people; 15 of these vessels sailed from London. Malvina arrived at Surinam in June 1804.

Tracing Malvina's subsequent history becomes difficult.

Year	Master	Owner	Trade	Notes & Source
1804	J. Watts	T. Wilson	London–Africa	LR
1804	J. Watts	J.Wilson	London–Africa	RS; Captured

The database on the Trans-Atlantic slave trade reports that Malvina left Suriname on 19 July and arrived back at London on 25 September 1804 with Kavannah, master. However, Malvina, Kavanagh, master, appears to have been a vessel of 353 tons (bm), launched at the British "Plantations" (colonies), in 1801. The volume of the Register of Shipping for 1806 showed her with Humble, owner, and having sailed between London and Suriname.

The volume of the Register of Shipping for 1804 carried the annotation "Captured" by the name of Malvina, Watts, master.

A French privateer captured a Malvina, Carr, master, on 2 December 1803, near Scilly as Malvina was on her way from Savannah to London. The privateer sent her into Saint-Malo. By one report the privateer was Braave, of Saint-Malo, and she sent her prize into Nantes. This capture took place before Malvina, Watts, master, arrived in Suriname. The Malvina, Carr, master, that had been captured was probably the Malvina of 246 tons (bm), launched in Maryland in 1790. The volume of LR for 1804 showed her with H.Dawson, master, J.Murray, owner, and trade Liverpool–Savannah. The discrepancy in the masters' names is not ideal, but not definitive as the registers often carried stale or inaccurate data.

LR continued to carry Malvina, Watts, master, until 1809 with data unchanged since 1804.
