= French frigate Romaine =

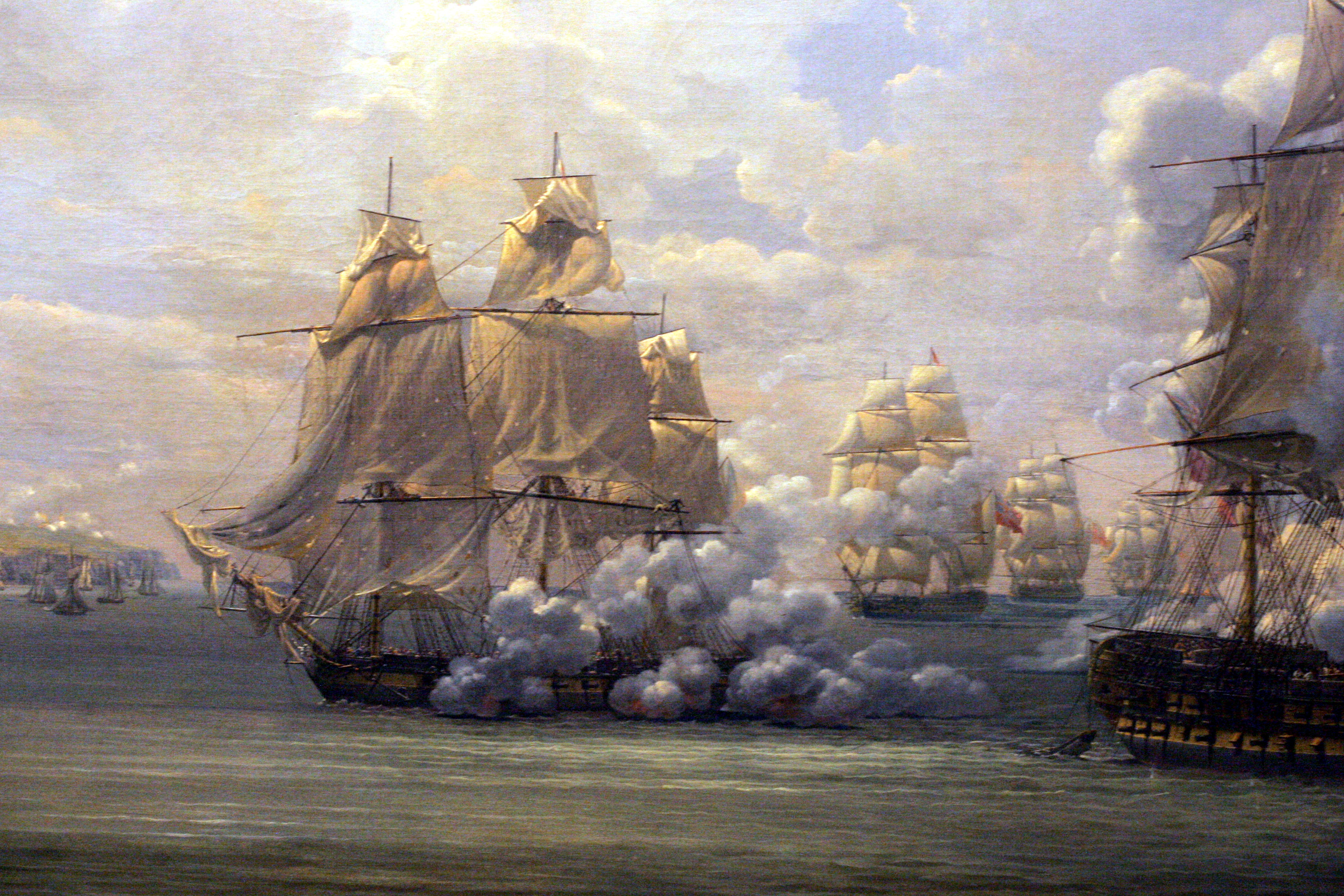
- The Poursuivante, sister ship of the Romaine

History

France
- Name: Romaine
- Namesake: Rome
- Builder: Le Havre
- Laid down: April 1794
- Launched: 1 October 1794
- In service: December 1794
- Stricken: 19 February 1804
- Fate: Broken up 1816

General characteristics
- Class & type: Romaine-class frigate
- Displacement: 700 tonnes
- Length: 45.5 m (149 ft 3 in)
- Beam: 11.8 m (38 ft 9 in)
- Draught: 5 m (16 ft 5 in)
- Propulsion: Sail
- Armament: 40 guns: 24 × 24-pounders; 16 × 8-pounders
- Armour: Timber

Romaine was the lead ship of her class of frigates of the French Navy.

She took part in the Expédition d'Irlande and in the Battle of Tory Island.

Quasi War:On 30 June, 1799 captured American armed ship "Mary Ann", 22 guns, sending her into Cadiz, Spain.

She cruised to New York City in 1802, and was condemned in 1804. In 1805 she was converted to a troop ship but never sailed again, and she was eventually broken up in 1816.
