= Alknomac (1796 ship) =

American boat from Boston

History

United States
- Name: Alknomac
- Builder: Boston
- Launched: 1796
- Captured: 1800
- Fate: Released 1801; subsequent fate is currently obscure

General characteristics
- Tons burthen: 201, or 240 (corrected from 201) (bm)
- Sail plan: Brig
- Armament: 4 × 4-pounder guns + 2 × 12-pounder carronades

Alknomac (or Alnomac) was launched in Boston in 1796. She began trading between the southern states of the United States and Great Britain. In 1800 a French privateer captured her, but she was released in 1801. As of January 2023, her subsequent fate is obscure.

== Career ==
The earliest mention of Alknomac in readily available on-line sources occurred in an advertisement in the Georgia Gazette that stated that she was accepting cargoes for London to depart in December 1798. It gave the name of her master as Francis Miller, and her owner as Gairdner and Mitchell. Another advertisement stated that she had recently arrived from London.

Alnomac first appeared in Lloyd's Register (LR) in 1798.

Alknomac first appeared in the Register of Shipping in the 1800 volume (the first year RS was published).

Year	Master	Owner	Trade	Source
1798	F.Miller	J.Gradner	Cork–Georgia	LR
1800	F.Miller	J.Gradner	London–Charleston	RS

Lloyd's List reported on 8 April 1800 that a privateer had taken Alknomac, Miller, master, as she was sailing from London to Charleston, and sent her into Bordeaux. Other records state that Alknomack, Miller, master, was brought into Lorient and Île de Ré. Her cargo included ten hogsheads of tobacco. The Register of Shipping for 1800 had the annotation "captured" by her name.

United States records have her captor as the French brig Gironde. An extract of a letter dated 29 October 1801 from Fulwar Skipwith, the United States's commercial agent in Paris, shows the French prize Court having released Alknomac on 8 Brumaire Year 10 (28 October 1801). She had not sustained damages. She benefited from Article 4 of the Convention of 1800 between France and America that stipulated that American vessels then in France but not yet definitively condemned, were to be returned.

By its 1801 volume, LR had corrected her name to Alknomac, though it still showed her burthen as 201 tons.

Year	Master	Owner	Trade	Source
1801	F.Miller	J.Gradner	London–Charleston	LR

Alknomac did not appear in RS after her capture. She did appear in LR up to the 1804 volume, but with unchanged data from 1801.
