= French frigate Impatiente =

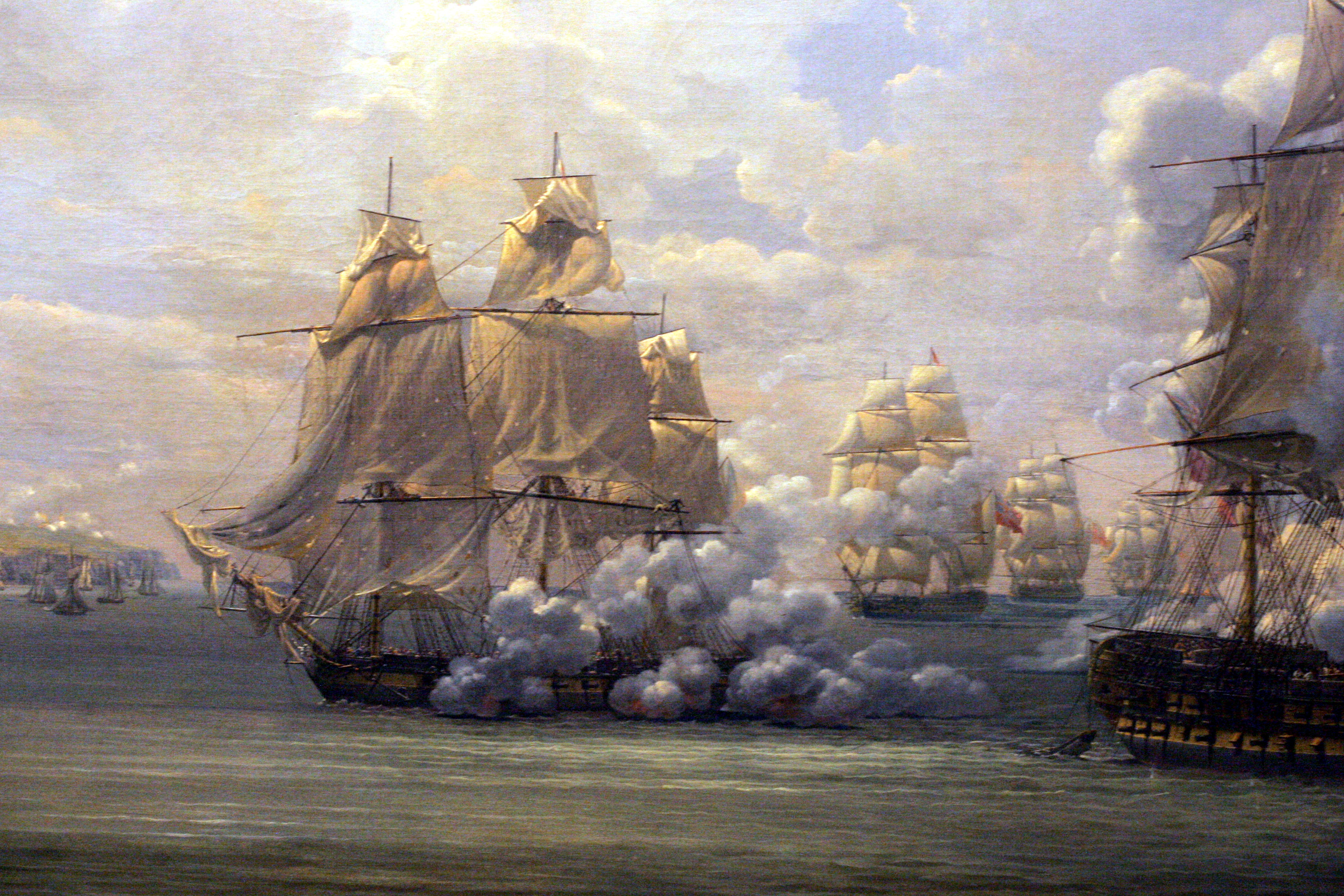
- Poursuivante, sister-ship of Impatiente

History

France
- Name: Impatiente
- Builder: Lorient
- Laid down: May 1794
- Launched: 12 March 1795
- In service: May 1795
- Fate: Wrecked 29 December 1796 off Cape Clear Island

General characteristics
- Class & type: Romaine-class frigate
- Displacement: 700 tonnes
- Length: 45.5 m (149 ft 3 in)
- Beam: 11.8 m (38 ft 9 in)
- Draught: 5 m (16 ft 5 in)
- Propulsion: Sail
- Armament: 40 guns: 24 × 24-pounders; 16 × 8-pounders

Impatiente was a Romaine-class frigate of the French Navy.

She took part in the Expédition d'Irlande, where she was wrecked on 29 December 1796. Only 7 survived, and 420 were lost.
