= Thames (1807 American ship) =

History

United Kingdom
- Name: Thames
- Namesake: River Thames
- Owner: Bebby & Co.
- Builder: New York
- Launched: 1798
- Acquired: 1807
- Captured: 10 January 1813

General characteristics
- Tons burthen: 171 (bm)
- Sail plan: Snow
- Complement: 1809: 25; At capture: 14
- Armament: 1809: 12 × 9&6-pounder guns; 1813: 6 × 6-pounder guns + 4 × 12-pounder carronades; At capture: 4 × 9-pounder guns + 4 × 12-pounder carronades

Thames was launched in New York in 1798, probably under another name. Bebby & Co., of Liverpool, acquired her circa 1807. An American privateer captured Thames in January 1813 as Thames was sailing back to Liverpool from Africa.

== Career ==
Thames first appeared in Lloyd's Register (LR) in 1807.

Year	Master	Owner	Trade	Source & notes
1807	Roberts	Bebby & Co.	Liverpool–Dublin	LR
1809	W.Ward; F.Toole	Bebby & Co.	Liverpool–Gothenburg; Liverpool–Africa	LR

Captain Francis Toole acquired a letter of marque on 28 March 1809.

Year	Master	Owner	Trade	Source & notes
1812	F.Toole	Bebby&Co.	Liverpool–Dublin; Liverpool–Africa	LR; large repair 1811
1813	F.Toole	Bebby & Co.	Liverpool–Africa	LR; large repair 1811

== Fate ==
The United States privateer Yankee captured Thames, Toole, master, in December 1812 or January 1813 off the coast of Africa. Thames was returning to Liverpool from Africa. Yankee landed Toole at Pernambuco in February. Thames arrived at Boston on 8 April.

LR for 1814 carried the annotation "capt." by her name.

Yankee, Captain Oliver Wilson, was on her second (of five cruises). She captured Thames on 10 January 1813 off Annabona. Thames was returning to Liverpool from Mayjumba with a cargo of 240 tons of camwood, some dry goods, and some ivory. Wilson estimated the value of vessel and cargo at $25,000. Another report put the value of the cargo at $40,000. A prize crew brought Thames safely into Boston.

In 1813 Yankee captured two vessel named Thames, the Thames of this article and Thames.
