= John St Barbe =

- Born: 8 October 1741; Southampton, England
- Died: 9 January 1816 (aged 74); Blackheath, London
- Occupations: British navy officer, shipbroker and shipowner
- Known for: Whaling ship owner

John St Barbe (1742–1816) was a British naval officer. He later became a prominent English shipbroker and shipowner in London. His vessels were active in whaling, the transport of convicts, and in the slave trade.

== Background and career ==
He was born 8 October 1741 at Southampton to Alexander St Barbe and Eleanor Wyatt. He joined the British Royal Navy and was listed as a lieutenant by January 1761 and a superannuated commander by August 1808. He held the position of Hoytaker (inspector of chartered ships) at the Victualling Office, from 1777 to 1784.

He had two children by his first wife, Ann Mambey, whom he married In 1766, and who died in 1791. His second wife, Margaret Galbraith, he married in June 1772 and they had ten children prior to her death in October 1802. Among his friends was ex Royal Navy surgeon and author Tobias Smollett.

St Barbe entered into a business partnership with shipbuilders Taylor and Young from 1782 to 1784. He later had William Bignell, his brother-in-law, and John Green, as partners. He was listed as a merchant in London commercial directories by 1791, with his address given as the same address as the Victualling Office. By 1783 he was named as an agent and broker. He also offered the services of ship's husband and insurance broker. He appears to have owned at various times a cumulative total of some 24 vessels, including nine whalers prior to 1815.

In 1810, he purchased shares in the Commercial Dock Company. He was elected an Elder Brother of Trinity House on 1 December 1814.

He died on 9 January 1816, at his home in Dartmouth-row, Blackheath, London.

== Vessels ==
- Anna Augusta (1801-1802)
- Atlantic (1783–1810)
- Britannia (1790–1797)
- Canada (1782–1800)
- Ceylon (1803–1809)
- Comet (1800–c. 1805/10)
- Crescent (1790–1798)
- Daphne (1793–?)
- Dart (1790–1792)
- Duckenfield Hall (1796–1799)
- Eurydice (1797–1798)
- Mercury (1790-1798)
- Mohawk (1789–1795?)
- Orpheus (1794–1801)
- Orpheus (1818–1820)
- Sandown (C.1788–1792)
- Scipio
- Sir William Bensley (1814–1823)
- Snake (1808-1810)
- Southampton (1786–1790)
- Tellicherry (1796–1806)
- Vernon (1786–1791)
- Wilding (1799–1805)
- Aurora (1789–1790)
- Jackall (1785–1797)
- Stormont (1784–1788)
