= Sir Stephen Lushington (1796 EIC ship) =

History

British East India Company
- Name: Sir Stephen Lushington
- Namesake: Sir Stephen Lushington, 1st Baronet
- Owner: EIC voyages 1-4: Peter Everitt Mestaer; EIC voyage 5:William Mavor; EIC voyages 6-7:John Mavor
- Builder: Randall, Brent & Sons, Rotherhithe
- Launched: 6 June 1796
- Fate: Last listed 1825

General characteristics
- Tons burthen: 608, or 60872/94 or 619, or 626, or 642 (bm)
- Length: 129 ft 1 in (39.3 m) (overall); 104 ft 2 1/2 in (31.8 m) (keel)
- Beam: 33 ft 2 in (10.1 m)
- Depth of hold: 13 ft 3 in (4.0 m)
- Propulsion: Sail
- Complement: 1796: 75; 1803:50; 1808:70
- Armament: 1796: 28 × 9&6-pounder guns; 1803: 14 × 9-pounder guns; 1808: 20 × 12&9-pounder guns; 1812:16 × 9-pounder guns + 4 × 12-pounder guns "of the New Construction"
- Notes: Three decks

Sir Stephen Lushington was launched in 1796 as an East Indiaman. She made seven voyages for the British East India Company (EIC). During this period she took part as a transport in two military campaigns, the cancelled attack on Manila in 1797, and the capture of Mauritius in 1810. In 1812 she became a West Indiaman, though around 1816 she made another voyage to India. Thereafter her ownership and trade become ambiguous: she either traded with Spain until 1822, or with South America until 1825.

== Career ==
=== EIC voyages ===
EIC voyage #1 (1796–1798): Captain George Gooch acquired a letter of marque on 16 July 1796. He sailed from Portsmouth on 11 August 1796, bound for Madras and Bengal. Sir Stephen Lushington reached the Cape of Good Hope on 18 November and Madras on 17 February 1797.

She arrived at Calcutta on 3 April. On 31 July she was at Kedgeree and Penang on 25 August. She returned to Kedgeree on 29 October and Calcutta on 4 November.

This to-and-fro was a consequence of the EIC and the Royal Navy preparing an expedition against Manila that then did not take place. (A peace treaty with Spain ended the plan.) Atlantic's owners charged the British government £3,192 for 210 days of demurrage.

Homeward bound, Sir Stephen Lushington was at Saugor on 23 December, Madras on 4 February 1798, and the Cape on 23 April. She reached St Helena on 25 May and arrived at the Downs on 2 August.

EIC voyage #2 (1799–1800): Captain Gooch sailed from Portsmouth on 24 April 1799, bound for Bengal and Bencoolen. Sir Stephen Lushington arrived at Diamond Harbour on 4 September. She was at Saugor on 7 December and arrived at Bencoolen on 27 January 1800. Homeward bound, she reached St Helena on 20 June. She arrived at the Downs on 24 September, together with 15 other East Indiamen that had left St Helena on 22 July, all under escort by HMS Madras.

EIC voyage #3 (1801–1802): Captain Gooch from Portsmouth on 31 March 1801, bound for Madras and Bengal. Sir Stephen Lushington reached Madras on 26 July and arrived at Diamond Harbour on 21 August. Homeward bound, she was at Saugor on 28 December, Vizagapatam on 13 January 1802, and Madras on 26 January. She reached St Helena on 14 May and arrived at the Downs on 12 July.

EIC voyage #4 (1803–1804): Captain Gooch sailed from the Downs on 30 January 1803, bound for Madras and Bengal. Sir Stephen Lushington reached Madras on 20 May and arrived at Calcutta on 26 June. Captain Gooch acquired a letter of marque on 2 July. Homeward bound, Sir Stephen Lushington was at Saugor on 11 November. She reached St Helena on 9 March and arrived at the Downs on 20 May.

EIC voyage #5 (1806–1808): Captain George Gray sailed from Portsmouth on 9 August 1806, bound for Bombay. Sir Stephen Lushington reached Rio de Janeiro on 13 November and the Cape on 16 January 1807. She reached Ceylon on 5 April and arrived at Bombay on 20 May. Homeward bound, she was at the Cape on 1 October, reached St Helena on 24 November, and arrived at the Downs on 27 January 1808.

EIC voyage #6 (1808–1809): Captain James Hay acquired a letter of marque 8 August 1808. Captain Hays sailed from Portsmouth on 7 September, bound for Madras. Sir Stephen Lushington reached Madeira on 29 September and arrived at Madras on 12 February. Homeward bound, she reached St Helena on 3 May and arrived at the Downs on 13 July.

EIC voyage #7 (1810–1811): Captain Hays sailed from Portsmouth on 14 March 1810, bound for Bombay and Madras. Sir Stephen Lushington arrived at Bombay at 2 July and Madras on 25 August.

For the invasion of Île de France (Mauritius) the British government hired a number of transport vessels, Sir Stephen Lushington among them.

Sir Stephen Lushington was at Rodrigues on 6 November, and arrived at Mauritius on 30 November. The invasion took place on 3 December. She sailed from Port Louis on 22 December, and arrived at Madras on 7 February 1811. Homeward bound she reached St Helena on 17 June and arrived at the Downs on 30 August.

=== West Indiaman ===
After her voyages for the EIC, new owners employed Sir Stephen Lushington as a West Indiaman. She appeared in Lloyd's Register in 1812 with W. Chivers, master, Lyney & Co., owner, and trade London–Surinam.

Lloyd's Register has the following data:

Year	Master	Owner	Trade
1816	W. Chivers	Lyney & Co.	London–Surinam; London–Bengal
1819	W. Chivers; M'Kellar	W. Chivers; Curling & Co.	London–Bengal; London–Cadiz
1822	S.M'Kellar	Curling & Co.	London–Cadiz

Sir Stephen Lushington then disappears from Lloyd's Register.

Sir Stephen Lushington was, in fact, one of several vessels that agents in British and French ports of the Spanish government had chartered to carry troops or supplies to the Royal forces in Peru. Another such vessel was Edward Ellice.

One report has Sir Stephen Lushington being sold to Joad & Co., London, in 1816. The Register of Shipping for 1820 shows her with M'Kellar, master, Joad & Co., owner, and trade London–South America. The Register of Shipping carries the same information unchanged to 1825.
