= Martha (1796 ship) =

British East Indiaman (1796–1797)

History

Great Britain
- Name: Martha
- Owner: Peter Everitt Mestaer
- Builder: Peter Everitt Mestaer, King and Queen Dock, Rotherhithe
- Launched: 5 July 1796
- Fate: Wrecked August 1797

General characteristics
- Tons burthen: 406, or 40643/94, or 428 (bm)
- Length: 113 ft 0 in (34.4 m) (overall); 91 ft 1 1/2 in (27.8 m) (keel)
- Beam: 28 ft 11 1/2 in (8.8 m)
- Depth of hold: 12 ft 3 1/2 in (3.7 m)
- Propulsion: Sail
- Complement: 30
- Armament: 10 × 6-pounder guns
- Notes: Three decks

Martha was built in 1796. The British East India Company (EIC) chartered her for a voyage to Bengal.

Captain Thomas Barnard was sworn into the EIC's service on 29 June 1796. He then acquired a letter of marque on 15 August 1796. He sailed from Portsmouth on 25 October 1796. Martha was lost on the Gasper Sand, Hooghli River, on 10 August 1797. Five people died.

The EIC reported that it had no cargo aboard, and that Martha was lost "going on an expedition". This may have been the expedition that the British government had intended to mount against Manila in 1797–98. The EIC held several vessels in India to support the expedition.
