= Walmer Castle (1796 EIC ship) =

British East India Company ship

History

Great Britain
- Name: Walmer Castle
- Namesake: Walmer Castle
- Owner: John Pascall Larkins
- Operator: British East India Company
- Builder: Frances Barnard, Deptford
- Launched: 23 May 1796
- Fate: Broken up 1821

General characteristics
- Tons burthen: 1460, or 1518, or 151848/94 (bm)
- Length: Overall:176 ft 10 in (53.9 m); Keel:144 ft 0 3/8 in (43.9 m)
- Beam: 43 ft 8 in (13.3 m)
- Depth of hold: 17 ft 6 in (5.3 m)
- Complement: 1796:130; 1796:130; 1799:130; 1803:140; 1806:150
- Armament: 1796: 40 × 12&18-pounder guns; 1796: 40 × 12&9-pounder guns; 1799: 32 × 12&9-pounder guns; 1803: 40 × 12&18-pounder guns; 1806: 40 × 12&18-pounder guns

Walmer Castle was launched in 1796 as an East Indiaman for the British East India Company (EIC). She made nine voyages for the EIC before she was sold in 1815 to sail as a troopship and supply ship for the British Army. She was broken up in 1821.

== EIC career ==
1st EIC voyage (1796–1798): Captain Henry Essex Bond acquired a letter of marque on 13 June 1796, and another on 24 June. He sailed from Portsmouth, bound for St Helena and China. Walmer Castle reached St Helena on 16 October and Amboina on 7 January 1797. She arrived at Whampoa Anchorage on 18 March. Homeward bound, she crossed the Second Bar on 10 June, reached the Cape on 2 December and St Helena on 3 January 1798, and arrived at the Downs on 17 March.

2nd EIC voyage (1799–1801): Captain George Bonham acquired a letter of marque on 1 February 1799. He sailed from Portsmouth on 2 April, bound for Bombay and China. Walmer Castle arrived at Bombay on 23 July. From there, she was at Penang on 13 December and Malacca on 1 January 1800. She arrived at Whampoa on 24 March. Homeward bound, she crossed the Second Bar on 2 June, reached St Helena on 5 December, and arrived at the Downs on 10 April 1801.

3rd EIC voyage (1802–1803): Captain Essex Henry Bond sailed from Portsmouth on 12 February 1802, bound for Bombay and China. Walmer Castle reached Bombay on 11 June, and arrived at Whampoa on 25 September. Homeward bound, she crossed the Second Bar on 3 January 1803, reached St Helena on 7 March, and arrived at the Downs on 22 April.

4th EIC voyage (1804–1805): Captain Essex Henry Bond acquired a letter of marque on 22 December 1803. He sailed from Portsmouth on 13 February 1804, bound for St Helena, Bencoolen, and China. Walmer Castle reached St Helena on 15 April and Bencoolen on 19 June. From there she sailed for China, reaching Penang on 13 August and Malacca on 13 September. She arrived at Whampoa on 14 October. Homeward bound, she crossed the Second Bar on 1 January 1805. She reached Penang again on 21 January and St Helena on 2 April. She arrived at the Downs on 10 September.

5th EIC voyage (1806–1807): Captain Luke Dodds acquired a letter of marque on 4 February 1806. He sailed from Portsmouth on 4 March, bound for Bombay and China. Walmer Castle reached Bombay on 20 June. She reached Penang on 4 September and arrived at Whampoa on 1 November. Homeward bound, she crossed the Second Bar on 6 January 1807, reached St Helena on 17 April, and arrived in the Downs on 2 July.

6th EIC voyage (1808–1809): Captain Dodds sailed from Torbay on 9 February 1808, bound for St Helena, the Cape, Bencoolen, and China. Walmer Caste reached St Helena on 17 April, the Cape on 31 May, Bencoolen on 13 July, and Penang on 18 September. She arrived at Whampoa on 8 November. Homeward bound, she crossed the Second Bar on 5 March and reached Penang on 30 March. She reached St Helena on 10 July and arrived at the Downs on 8 September.

7th EIC voyage (1811–1812): Captain Dodds sailed from Torbay on 16 February 1811, bound for St Helena, Bencoolen, and China. Walmer Castle reached St Helena on 6 May, Bencoolen on 24 July, Penang on 23 September, and Malacca on 28 October. She arrived at Whampoa on 1 January 1812. Homeward bound, she crossed the Second Bar on 26 February, reached St Helena on 17 May, and arrived in the Downs on 21 July.

8th EIC voyage (1813–1814): Captain Dodds sailed from Torbay on 23 March 1813, bound for the Cape and China. Walmer Castle reached Tenerife on 11 April and the Cape on 15 June. She arrived at Whampoa on 6 September. Homeward bound, she crossed the Second Bar on 22 February 1814, reached St Helena on 26 May, and arrived in the Downs on 6 August.

9th EIC voyage (1815–1816): Captain David Sutton sailed from Portsmouth on 7 April 1815. Walmer Castle arrived at Whampoa on 11 September. Homeward bound, she crossed the Second Bar on 6 December, reached St Helena on 2 March 1816, and arrived back at the Downs on 29 April.

While Walmer Castle was on her ninth voyage, she was sold on 18 July 1815 at Lloyd's Coffee House as a troopship and supply ship for the Army.

When Walmer Castle arrived back in London, she discharged her crew, including her Chinese sailors hired in Canton. Princess Amelia repatriated 20 to Canton, together with 360 others, leaving the Downs on 20 July 1816.

== Fate ==
On 25 September 1821 Walmer Castle's register was cancelled, demolition having been completed.
