= Glatton (1796 EIC ship) =

History

Great Britain
- Owner: EIC voyages 1–6: Sir Richard Neave; EIC voyages 7-8: Sir Robert Wigram.
- Builder: John & William Wells, Rotherhithe
- Launched: 23 May 1796
- Fate: Sold in 1815 for use as a hulk

General characteristics
- Tons burthen: 1432, or 14327/94, or 1507 (bm)
- Length: Overall: 176 ft 10 in (53.9 m); Keel: 144 ft 2 1/2 in (44.0 m)
- Beam: 43 ft 2 1/2 in (13.2 m)
- Depth of hold: 17 ft 5 1/2 in (5.3 m)
- Complement: 1796: 130; 1804: 140; 1806: 140; 1809: 150
- Armament: 1796: 30 × 12-pounder guns; 1804: 26 × 12-pounder guns + 10 × 18-pounder carronades; 1806: 32 × 12&18-pounder cannons; 1809: 34 × 12-pounder guns

Glatton was launched in Rotherhithe in 1796. Between 1796 and 1815 she made eight voyages to South-East Asia, China, and India as an East Indiaman for the British East India Company (EIC). In 1815 her owners sold her for use as a hulk.

== Career ==
1st EIC voyage (1796–1798): Captain Charles Drummond acquired a letter of marque on 30 June 1796. He sailed from Portsmouth on 11 August, bound for China. She captured a Dutch prow in the Straits of Flores in 1796,

Glatton reached Amboina on 7 January 1797 and arrived at Whampoa on 19 March. Homeward bound she left China on 15 June and was at Whampoa on 27 August. She crossed the Second Bar on 31 December. She was at the Cape on 17 March 1798 and St Helena on 15 April. She was at Cork and arrived back at Gravesend on 11 July.

2nd EIC voyage (1799–1801): Captain Drummond sailed from Portsmouth on 2 April 1799, bound for St Helena, Bencoolen, and China. Glatton was at St Helena on 5 July, reached Bencoolen on 24 October, and arrived at Whampoa on 23 March 1800.

Glatton captured the ship Copenhagen in 1799.

Homeward bound, she crossed the Second Bar on 26 May, and was at Bouro on 25 August and Sambava on 14 September. She reached St Helena on 5 December and arrived at Gravesend on 17 April.

3rd EIC voyage (1802–1803): Captain William Macnamara sailed from the Downs on 29 March 1802. She left during the Peace of Amiens and so Macnamara did not require a letter of marque. Glatton reached St. Salvadore on 10 May and arrived at Whampoa on 10 September. Homeward bound, she crossed the Second Bar on 8 November, reached St Helena on 16 February 1803, and arrived at Gravesend on 24 April.

4th EIC voyage (1804–1805): War with France had resumed in 1803 so Captain Charles Drummond acquired a letter of marque on 23 January 1804. He sailed from Portsmouth on 13 February 1804, bound gor Bombay and China. Glatton returned to her moorings on 12 September 1805.

5th EIC voyage (1806–1808): Captain James Halliburton acquired a letter of marque on 3 April 1804. He sailed from Portsmouth on 14 May, bound for China. Glatton reached Penang on 15 October and arrived at Whampoa on 19 January 1807. Homeward bound, she crossed the Second Bar on 23 February, reached the Cape on 19 September and St Helena on 13 October, and arrived at the Downs on 28 December.

6th EIC voyage (1809–1810): Captain Halliburton acquired a letter of marque on 24 February 1809. He sailed from Portsmouth on 5 April, bound for China. Glatton reached Penang on 23 July, and arrived at Whampoa on 6 November. Homeward bound, she crossed the Second Bar on 21 December, reached St Helena on 22 May 1810, and arrived at the Downs on 28 July.

7th EIC voyage (1812–1813): Captain Halliburton sailed from Portsmouth on 25 March 1812, bound for China. Glatton reached Penang on 25 July and Malacca on 25 August, and arrived at Whampoa on 20 September. Homeward bound, she crossed the Second Bar on 15 December, reached St Helena on 27 March 1813, and arrived at Long Reach on 7 June.

8th EIC voyage (1814–1815): Captain Halliburton sailed from Portsmouth on 22 February 1814, bound for St Helena, Bencoolen, and China. Glatton reached St Helena on 2 May, Bencoolen on 10 August, and Penang on 30 August. She arrived at Whampoa on 2 December. Homeward bound, she crossed the Second Bar on 21 January 1815, reached St Helena on 21 May, and arrived at Long Reach on 22 August.

== Fate ==
Her owners sold Glatton in 1815 for a hulk.
