= Thames (1796 EIC ship) =

History

Great Britain
- Owner: Abel Chapman
- Operator: East India Company
- Builder: Perry, Sons & Green, Blackwall
- Launched: 22 April 1796
- Fate: Broken up in 1816

General characteristics
- Tons burthen: 1432, or 143215/94, or 1487 (bm)
- Complement: 1796:130; 1804:140; 1806:130
- Armament: 1796: 36 × 12&9-pounder guns; 1804:36 × 9&12-pounder guns; 1806:36 × 12&9-pounder guns

Thames was launched on the Thames in 1796 as an East Indiaman. She made eight voyages for the British East India Company (EIC). She was sold for breaking up in 1816.

== Career ==
1st EIC voyage (1796–1798): Captain Robert Williams acquired a letter of marque on 20 June 1796. He sailed from Portsmouth on 11 August 1796, bound for St Helena and China. Thames reached St Helena on 16 October and Amboina on 8 January 1797, before arriving at Whampoa Anchorage on 21 March. Homeward bound, she crossed the Second Bar on 9 June, reached the Cape on 23 October and St Helena on 3 December, and arrived back at the Downs on 30 January 1798.

2nd EIC voyage (1798–1801): Captain Williams sailed from Portsmouth on 4 October 1798, bound for Bombay and China. She had put in at Portsmouth in August and developed a leak. She had to unload part of her cargo before the leak could be found and fixed. Thames reached the Cape on 5 January 1799 and Madras on 21 April. She arrived at Bombay on 21 July. She sailed from Bombay on 4 February 1800 and arrived at Whampoa on 6 May. Homeward bound, she crossed the Second Bar on 11 August, reached St Helena on 1 February 1801, and arrived in the Downs on 10 April.

3rd EIC voyage (1802–1803):] Captain Williams sailed from Portsmouth on 12 February 1802, bound for Bombay and China. Thames arrived in Bombay on 11 June and Whampoa on 25 September. Homeward bound, she crossed the Second Bar on 3 January 1803, reached St Helena on 7 March, and arrived in the Downs on 24 April.

4th EIC voyage (1804–1805): Captain John Skottowe acquired a letter of marque on 23 January 1804. Thames sailed from Plymouth on 26 February 1804, bound for St Helena and China. She reached St Helena on 19 May and left on 9 July. She arrived at Whampoa on 13 October. Homeward bound, she crossed the Second Bar 1 January 1805, reached St Helena on 2 April, and left on 11 July. She arrived back at the Downs on 10 September.

5th EIC voyage (1806–1808): Captain Matthew Riches acquired a letter of marque on 4 April 1806. He sailed from Portsmouth on 14 May, bound for China. Thames reached Penang on 14 October and arrived at Whampoa on 19 January 1807. Homeward bound, she crossed the Second Bar on 3 April, reached the Cape on 19 September and St Helena on 13 October, and arrived back at the Downs on 28 December.

6th EIC voyage (1809–1810): Captain Riches sailed from Portsmouth on 5 April 1809, bound for China. Thames arrived at Whampoa on 25 September. Homeward bound, she crossed the Second Bar on 25 February 1810, reached St Helena on 21 May, and arrived back in the Downs on 28 July.

7th EIC voyage (1812–1813): Captain Riches sailed from Torbay on 4 January 1812, bound for St Helena, Bencoolen, and China. Thames reached St Helena on 20 March, the Cape on 7 May, Bencoolen on 29 June, Penang on 22 August, and Malacca on 13 September. She arrived at Whampoa on 18 October. Homeward bound, she crossed the Second Bar on 17 January 1813, reached St Helena on 5 April, and arrived at the Downs on 5 June.

8th EIC voyage (1814–1815): Riches sailed from Portsmouth on 9 April 1814. She reached Penang on 19 August, and Malacca on 15 September. She was off Lintin Island on 19 October, and arrived at Whampoa on 11 December. Homeward bound, she crossed the Second Bar on 9 February 1815, reached St Helena on 12 May, and arrived at the Downs on 19 August.

== Fate ==
In 1816 she was sold for breaking up.
