= Tellicherry (1796 ship) =

History

Great Britain
- Name: Tellicherry
- Namesake: Tellicherry (now Thalassery)
- Owner: John St Barbe
- Port of registry: London
- Builder: Joshua Young, Globe Stairs, Rotherhithe
- Launched: 9 May 1796
- Fate: Wrecked 13 July 1806

General characteristics
- Tons burthen: 465, or 46530/94, or 467, (bm)
- Length: 125 ft 3 in (38.2 m) (overall); 116 ft 0 in (35.4 m) (keel)
- Beam: 36 ft 0 1/2 in (11.0 m)
- Depth of hold: 14 ft 9 in (4.5 m)
- Propulsion: Sail
- Complement: 1796: 36; 1805: 23
- Armament: 1796: 10 × 6-pounder guns; 1805: 14 × 6- & 18-pounder guns

Tellicherry (or Tillicheri) was a two-decker ship built on the Thames in 1796, in England for John St Barbe, a wealthy merchant and ship owner. She made four voyages as an "extra ship" for the East India Company. Later, she made one trip to Australia transporting convicts. She was wrecked in 1806, in the Philippines.

== East Indiaman ==
Tillichery enters Lloyd's Register in 1796, with S. Baker, master, and St Barbe, owner.

Tellicherry made four voyages for the East India company as an extra ship, the first three under the command of Captain Sampson Baker. He received a letter of marque on 2 June 1796.

=== EIC Voyage 1 (1796-98) ===
Baker left Portsmouth on 11 August 1796, sailing for Bengal. Tellicherry reached Calcutta on 3 February 1797. For the return leg she left Calcutta on 6 July, reached the Cape on 29 October, St Helena on 3 December, and the Downs on 31 January 1798. In the process "Tillicherry" had to put into Ramsgate after having run ashore on the Sandwich Flats.

=== EIC Voyage 2 (1798-99) ===
Baker left Portsmouth on 8 June 1798, bound for St Helena and Bengal. Tellicherry reached St Helena on 19 August, leaving on 14 September. She arrived in Calcutta on 22 December. On the return leg she passed Saugor on 16 March 1799, and arrived at the Downs on 25 September.

=== EIC Voyage 3 (1800-01) ===
For his third trip, Baker left Portsmouth on 28 June 1800, bound for Bengal and Madras. On 14 January 1801, Tellicherry arrived at Calcutta. On her return leg she arrived at Madras on 12 March, Point de Galle on 7 April, St Helena on 5 August, and the Downs on 2 November.

=== EIC Voyage 4 (1802–03) ===
Tellicherry was under the command of George Welstead when she left the Downs for Bengal on 13 April 1802. She returned a year later, mooring on 27 April 1803. She had stopped at Rio de Janeiro on 16 June, and arrived at Calcutta on 18 October.

== Subsequent career ==
The 1803, Lloyd's Register shows Tellicherry still under John St Barbe's ownership, with her master's name given as S. Baker, and then T. Cousins. She apparently traded between Cork and Portsmouth.

=== Convict transport to New South Wales ===
Thomas Cuzens received a letter of marque for Tellicherry on 6 May 1805. He sailed her from Cork, Ireland on 31 August 1805. She left at the same time as William Pitt, and would arrive at Port Jackson some two months earlier. Tellicherry spent three days at Madeira on her way and arrived at Port Jackson on 15 February 1806. (Note: Bateson has diagram showing how prisoners were chained and handcuffed in convict ships. The diagrams also show how the bunks for the male convicts were arranged. The contrast with the arrangements in the slave ship Brooks are quite striking. The convicts were British subjects and wards of the British government. The reduced crowding on the convict ships relative to the slave ships may have been a factor in the reduced death rates on convict ships relative to slave ships, but the evidence is ambiguous.)

Tellichery had embarked 130 male and 36 female convicts. Five male convicts and one female convict died on the voyage. The guard consisted of 28 other ranks of the New South Wales Corps.

Among the convicts were Michael Dwyer, an officer and guerrilla leader in the United Irishmen, and his friends John Mernagh, Hugh Byrne, Martin Burke, and Arthur Devlin. All agreed to transportation to New South Wales in lieu of trial for treason for their roles in the Irish rebellion of 1798 and subsequent resistance. Dwyer brought his wife and their eldest children with him, as did Hugh Byrne.

== Fate ==
Tellicherry left Port Jackson on 6 April 1806, for Bengal, or China, to load a cargo of tea. When passing through the Mindoro Strait in the Philippines, Tillicherry was wrecked on 13 July, on the Apo Bank. She was a total loss. The crew survived by abandoning ship in the ship's boats and making their way to Manila. A passing American ship took them to Macao, where they arrived on 1 August 1806. The EIC put the value of the cargo that it had lost on Tellichery at £924.
