= Pierre-Paulin Gourrège =

French Navy officer (1749–1805)

Pierre-Paulin Gourrège (French pronunciation: [pjɛʁ polɛ̃ ɡuʁɛʒ]; 9 June 1749 in Bordeaux — 27 October 1805 near Cadiz) was a French Navy officer and captain.

== Career ==
Gourrège started his career in the merchant Navy in 1749, rising to assistant pilot the next year, to lieutenant in 1772 and earning his commission of captain in 1777. In 1791, he became captain in the National Guard, and was appointed Lieutenant in the Navy on 1 July 1792, taking command of the frigate Fraternité on 13 November 1793. With Fraternité, he cruised from Brest off Southern Spain before transferring on Brutus.

On 21 March 1796, Gourrège was promoted to Commander, and to Captain on 22 September. On 10 November, he was appointed to Coquille, supervised the commissioning of Indienne at the Havre from 20 October 1797, and took command of Créole on 12 April 1799.

After taking part in an abortive sortie with the division under contre-amiral Lacrosse, where Créole sustained some damage in a collision with Fidèle, Gourrège took part in Ganteaume's expeditions of 1801. During the cruise, (Note: Troude (p.228) lists Gourrège as captain of Indivisible at the departure of the fleet on 27 January, probably mistakenly.) he was appointed to the 80-gun Indivisible, which he commanded during the action of 24 June 1801, where she and Dix-Août captured HMS Swiftsure.

Gourrège commanded the Jean Bart from 5 September 1801, and the Aigle from 28 November 1802. In 1803, he served off Santo Domingo, ferrying troops from Livorno to Cap-Français and performing an amphibious landing at Gonaïves, before returning to Cadiz. On 5 February 1804, he was made a Knight in the order of the Legion of Honour, and promoted to Officer on 14 June.

On Aigle, he reinforced the Franco-Spanish fleet during the Trafalgar Campaign and took part in the Battle of Cape Finisterre and in the Battle of Trafalgar, where he was mortally wounded at the outbreak of the fight possibly by mistake by fire from Principe de Asturias. Aigle was captured during the battle, recaptured afterwards by her own crew, who had mutinied against the British, but ultimately wrecked near Cadiz. Gourrège died of his injuries six days after the battle.

== Sources and references ==
=== Bibliography ===
- Quintin, Danielle et Bernard (2003). Dictionnaire des capitaines de Vaisseau de Napoléon. S.P.M. ISBN 2-901952-42-9.
- Roche, Jean-Michel (2005). Dictionnaire des bâtiments de la flotte de guerre française de Colbert à nos jours 1 1671 - 1870. p. 25. ISBN 978-2-9525917-0-6. OCLC 165892922.
- GOURREGE (Pierre-Paulin) (1749 – 1805)
- Troude, Onésime-Joachim (1867). Batailles navales de la France. Vol. 3. Challamel ainé.
