= French frigate Créole =

1797 fifth-rate frigate

History

France
- Name: Créole
- Builder: Louis and Antoine Crucy, Basse-Indres, Nantes
- Laid down: 5 January 1794
- Launched: 27 June 1797
- In service: January 1799
- Captured: 30 June 1803 by the Royal Navy

United Kingdom
- Name: HMS Creole
- Acquired: 30 June 1803
- Fate: Wrecked on 2 January 1804

General characteristics
- Displacement: 1,350 tons (French)
- Length: 48.93 m (160.5 ft)
- Beam: 11.91 m (39.1 ft)
- Draught: 5.8 m (19 ft)
- Complement: 340 (wartime); 260 (peaceime)
- Armament: UD: 28 × 18-pounder long guns; Spardeck: 12 × 8-pounder long guns

Créole was a 40-gun frigate of the French Navy, a one-off design by Jacques-Augustin Lamothe. The French Navy loaned her to a privateer in 1797. Later, she served in the Brest squadron, took part in Ganteaume's expeditions of 1801 to Egypt, and was involved in the French acquisition of Santo Domingo (also known as the Era de Francia) and briefly detained Toussaint Louverture before he was brought to France. The 74-gun ships HMS Vanguard and HMS Cumberland captured her in Santo Domingo on 30 June 1803. The Royal Navy took her into service but she foundered soon afterwards during an attempt to sail to Britain; her crew were rescued.

== Career ==
=== Early career ===
After her launch, Créole was fitted for four months before being lent 19 October 1797 to a privateer from Nantes. She was commissioned in the Navy on 29 April 1798 and started patrolling off Brest in February 1799.

On 12 April, capitaine de vaisseau Pierre-Paulin Gourrège took command. On 26 April 1799, Créole departed Brest with the oceanic fleet and took part in Bruix' expedition of 1799 into the Mediterranean. She was detached to Oneglia, along with Romaine and Vautour, to support the French invasion of Italy.

The British hired armed cutter Sandwich was under the command of Lieutenant George Lempriere and cruising off the coast of Barcelona on 14 June 1799 when she sighted a large fleet. Lempriere believed the vessels to be a British fleet and sailed towards them. When the strange vessels did not reply to the recognition signals, Lempriere realized that they were enemy vessels and attempted to sail away. The French fleet detached a lugger, possibly Affronteur, to pursue Sandwich. A frigate joined the lugger in pursuit and towards evening the lugger opened fire with her bow chasers. The frigate then too opened fire, with Sandwich returning fire as best she could. By 1a.m. the frigate was within musket shot of Sandwich and any further resistance would have been futile. Lempriere then struck to Créole.

In 1800, Créole was part of a division under contre-amiral Lacrosse, tasked to cruise off Morbihan and cut off the royalists from their British support. In order to avoid the British blockade, the squadron anchored to Camaret, but attracted the attention of the British and sailed back to harbour to avoid engagement. The division was retasked to ferry 4600 troops to Santo Domingo, but again ran into the British blockade, turned back and adjourned its mission. During the cruise, Créole sustained some damage in a collision with Fidèle.

=== Ganteaume's expeditions of 1801 ===
On 27 January 1801, Créole departed Brest with a division under contre-amiral Ganteaume, tasked to ferry ammunitions and reinforcements to the Armée d'Égypte, taking part in Ganteaume's expeditions of 1801. After several false starts due to unfavourable weather or to the British blockade, Ganteaume eventually set sail on 23 February on a heavy sea which soon dispersed his squadron. The next day, Créole rejoined Indivisible, and the two ships sailed together until they finally made contact with their division.

Ganteaume reached Toulon on 18 February; Gourrège left Créole to take command of the flagship Indivisible on 9 March. The squadron set sail on 25 April. His crew much weakened by an epidemic, Ganteaume managed to establish a blockade of Elba on 1 May and bombard Portoferraio on 6 May, supporting the Siege of Porto Ferrajo, but he had to detach Formidable, Indomptable, Dessaix and Créole to ferry the sick to Livorno and return to Toulon.

Créole took an incidental part in the action of 24 June 1801, where the lone British 74-gun HMS Swiftsure met the French squadron and was captured after a running battle.

=== Santo Domingo ===
On 9 January 1802, Créole departed Toulon with a division under contre-amiral Ganteaume, ferrying troops to Santo Domingo to consolidate the French occupation of Santo Domingo. After Toussaint Louverture surrendered, he was embarked on Créole before being transferred on Héros and ferried to France, where he died in prison. Boarding the frigate, Louverture stated:

In overthrowing me you have cut down in Saint-Domingue only the trunk of the tree of liberty; it will spring up again from the roots, for they are many and they are deep.

In 1803, Créole ferried troops to Port-au-Prince under Commander Jean-Marie-Pierre Lebastard, travelling to Jean-Rabel from Cap-Français with 530 soldiers under General Morgan. (Note: Troude gives a figure of 450.) Her crew suffered from the yellow fever that was endemic to the campaign, so that only 150 men were fit and the frigate was 177 short of her usual complement. In the morning of 30 June, Créole met five British ships of the line, who closed in to investigate and gave chase. Créole was unable to escape the ships of the line as Vanguard and Cumberland came up and flanked her. Vanguard opened fire, and after a single token gunshot, Créole struck to her overwhelmingly better-armed opponents.

== Fate ==
A prize crew conveyed Créole to Port Royal in Jamaica for repair. There the Royal Navy commissioned her as HMS Creole under Captain Austin Bissell.

In the closing months of 1803, the vessel Créole embarked towards Britain, manned by a prize crew alongside a contingent of French prisoners. The state of Créole was notably deteriorated, and on 26 December, it was discovered that she had developed a leak. Efforts by both crew and prisoners to operate the pumps were insufficient to halt the rising water levels, which by 30 December were increasing at a rate of two feet per hour. The discovery of two significant leaks, one located forward and the other aft of the hold, prompted the crew to jettison the ship's armaments, ammunition, iron ballast, and certain supplies overboard, in addition to rigging a sail beneath the hull in an attempt to slow the ingress of water. However, by 2 January, the situation had not improved, and the combined efforts of the crew and prisoners to manage the pumps were once again overwhelmed. With exhaustion setting in among all aboard, the decision was made by Bissell, the officer in charge, to evacuate the ship. The Cumberland arrived to facilitate the rescue of all individuals from the Créole. The evacuation was completed by 3 January, shortly before Créole succumbed to the sea at the coordinates 40°42′N 51°24′W.

An eyewitness report states that the crew set fire to Creole as they abandoned her. Her magazine exploded when the fire reached it, shattering her. She sank soon thereafter.
