= Action of 24 June 1801 =

Minor naval engagement during the French Revolutionary Wars

- Part of the French Revolutionary Wars
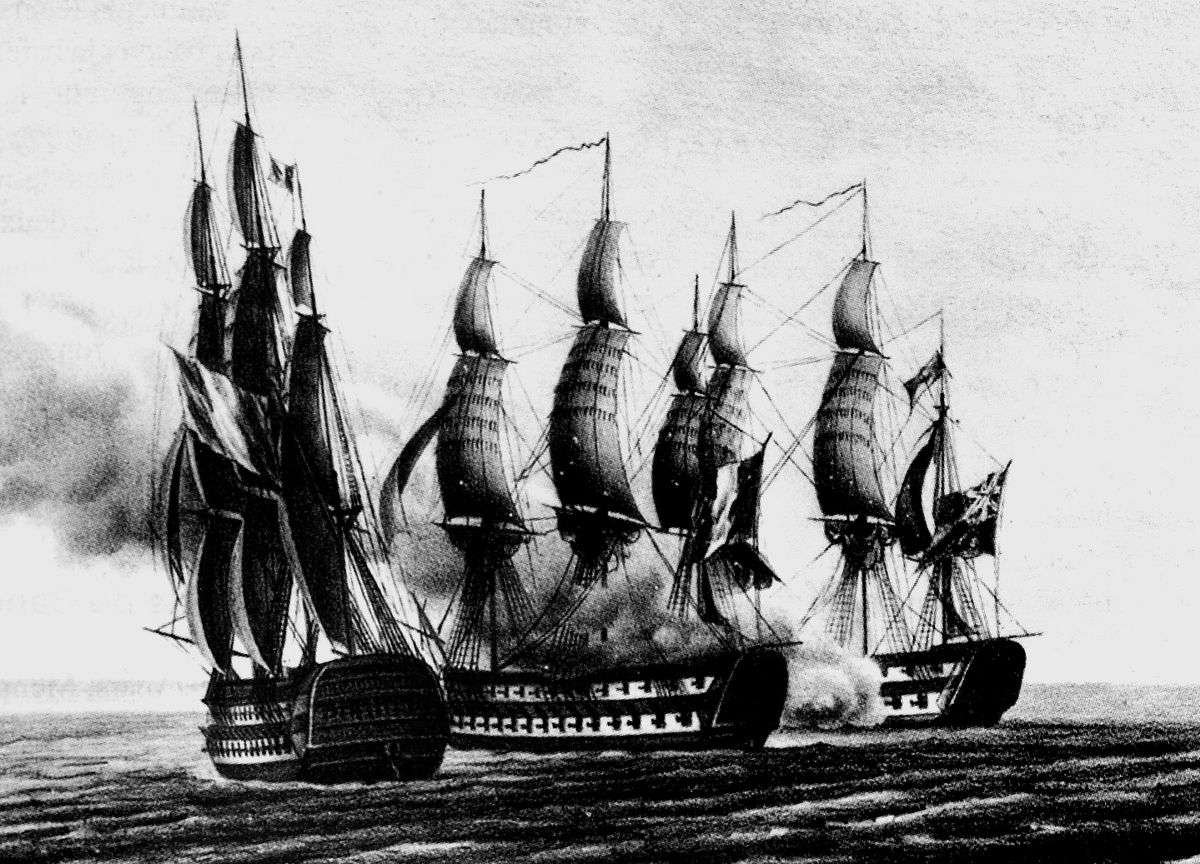
- The capture of HMS Swiftsure
Date	24 June 1801
Location	21 nautical miles (39 km) northeast of Cape Derna
Result	French victory

Belligerents
(France) French Republic	United Kingdom

Commanders and leaders
Contre-Amiral Honoré Ganteaume; Captain Louis-Marie Le Gouardun; Captain Pierre-Paulin Gourrège	Captain Benjamin Hallowell

Strength
Two ships of the line and one frigate engaged. Two more ships of the line in support.	Ship of the line HMS Swiftsure

Casualties and losses
33 killed and wounded	2 killed 8 wounded Swiftsure captured

The action of 24 June 1801 was a minor naval engagement during the French Revolutionary Wars. A British ship of the line, HMS Swiftsure under Captain Benjamin Hallowell was passing westwards through the Southern Mediterranean near Cape Derna when it encountered a much larger French squadron under Contre-Amiral Honoré Ganteaume that was also returning westwards after a failed attempt to reinforce the besieged French garrison in Egypt. Although Hallowell immediately recognised the danger his vessel was in and turned to flee, the French ships were much faster and soon closed with his ship. At 14:00, three French vessels were within long gunshot and Hallowell decided that his only hope of escape lay in disabling the three ships before the rest of the French squadron could join the engagement. Turning towards the enemy, Hallowell found that his sluggish ship was unable to respond rapidly to French manoeuvres and within two hours Swiftsure was surrounded. Threatened with complete destruction and unable to escape, the British captain surrendered.

The action was a rare victory for the French in the Mediterranean Sea, which had been largely under British control since the French Mediterranean Fleet had been destroyed in 1798 at the Battle of the Nile. This had trapped the French army in Egypt on the African side of the Mediterranean, and all efforts to reinforce and resupply them had ended in failure, including three separate expeditions by Ganteaume's squadron. Swiftsure was later commissioned into the French Navy and fought at the Battle of Trafalgar in 1805, where the ship was recaptured by the British and rejoined the Royal Navy. Hallowell was subsequently court martialed for the loss of his ship, but was honourably acquitted and returned to naval service.

== Background ==
On 1 August 1798, during the Battle of the Nile, a British fleet under Rear-Admiral Sir Horatio Nelson destroyed the French Mediterranean Fleet at Aboukir Bay on the Egyptian coast. The battle completely reversed the strategic situation in the Mediterranean: British forces had evacuated the region in 1796 after the Treaty of San Ildefonso brought Spain into the war on the French side, but they were now able to return in large numbers. As French maritime lines of communication were cut, the French Armée d'Orient under General Napoleon Bonaparte became trapped in Egypt. Unable to return to Europe by sea, the army attempted and failed to pass overland through Palestine and was subsequently abandoned by Bonaparte, who returned to France with his closest advisors in the frigates Muiron and Carrère in November 1799, promising to send reinforcements to the forces that remained in North Africa.

By 1801, the Armée d'Orient was on the verge of collapse. No supplies or support had arrived from France, their commander Jean Baptiste Kléber had been assassinated, and a British invasion was impending. Frustrated at his failure to assist his men in Egypt, Bonaparte ordered a squadron of ships of the line to sail from Brest in January 1801 under the command of Contre-Amiral Honoré Ganteaume. This force was instructed to sail to the Eastern Mediterranean and land over 5,000 troops at Alexandria. In February, Ganteaume's force reached Toulon, the admiral concerned that his ships would be outnumbered further east where the British expeditionary force was gathering. Bonaparte sent him back to sea to complete the operation but again he returned, driven back by bad weather and a patrolling British squadron off Sicily under Rear-Admiral Sir John Borlase Warren. On 27 April Ganteaume made a third attempt to reach Egypt, and reached Benghazi before pressure from larger British forces under Admiral Lord Keith drove his squadron back westwards. On 24 June, Ganteaume's ships were retreating along the North African coast, passing close to Cape Derna.

Also in the region was the British 74-gun ship of the line HMS Swiftsure under Captain Benjamin Hallowell, a veteran of the Battle of the Nile three years earlier. Swiftsure was passing slowly along the North African coast after being detached from Keith's fleet to join Warren's squadron off Malta, escorting a small convoy en route. Hallowell's ship was understrength as more than 80 men had been removed from the ship for service in Egyptian waters and illness rendered another 59 unfit for duty, while the vessel itself was in a poor state of repair and leaking badly. Progress had been slow, and a northeasterly wind had also significantly delayed Hallowell's passage. When he learned from a passing vessel that there was a French squadron in the region, he ordered the convoy to separate and sailed for Malta alone in an effort to join Warren more rapidly and warn him of Ganteaume's return. At 03:30 on 24 June his lookouts sighted sails to the southwest. Hallowell immediately assumed that the distant ships were the enemy and he turned away from the French and tacked into the wind. By 05:30, lookouts on the nearest French ships, the ships of the line Jean Bart and Constitution had spotted the distant British vessel and were ordered to give chase.

== Battle ==
The French ships followed Swiftsure by tacking into the wind and a complicated chase developed, with Jean Bart and Constitution maintaining the pressure on the slow moving British vessel, while the rest of Ganteaume's squadron used the prevailing wind to push far ahead of the ongoing chase before tacking at 08:00 across Hallowell's intended course. Unless Hallowell could escape the trap, his ship would be caught between the two French divisions and overwhelmed. For six hours Hallowell continued his efforts to escape, but the French ships were too fast, Ganteaume's force passing some distance ahead of the British ship and then turning back towards him so that by 14:00 Swiftsure was at serious risk of being surrounded. Hallowell determined that his only option was to attempt to drive through those ships of Ganteaume's division that blocked his passage to leeward, the ships of the line Indivisible (under Pierre-Paulin Gourrège) and Dix-Août (under Louis-Marie Le Gouardun) and the frigate Créole.

At 15:00, with the detached division rapidly approaching from astern, Hallowell turned his ship towards the ships sailing ahead of Swiftsure and attempted to pass across the stern of the rearmost ship in an effort to rake and disable it, creating enough confusion to mask an escape. The manoeuvere was recognised by the French captains, and all three vessels turned to face the British ship as it approached. By 15:30 the ships of the line had opened a mutual fire, during which the faster French warships were able to easily outmanoeuvre the lumbering Swiftsure. At 16:37, after more than an hour of fruitless firing at long range, the arrival of Jean Bart and Constitution within gunshot convinced Hallowell that further resistance was hopeless and he struck his flag to signal his surrender.

Swiftsure had taken significant damage to its masts, rigging and sails during the exchange of fire, a deliberate ploy by the French captains to limit the ship's movement and prevent its escape. This had minimised casualties on deck by distracting the gunfire, and as a result, only two men were killed and eight wounded, two of whom subsequently also died. French losses were more severe, with four casualties on Indivisible and six killed and 23 wounded on Dix-Août, although neither ship was significantly damaged in the action.

== Aftermath ==
Ganteaume's fleet remained off the Cape Derna for the next six days, performing repairs to the captured vessel to make it seaworthy. Detachments of sailors were taken from all of the ships in the squadron and transferred to the prize, and on 30 June Ganteaume's force was ready to sail northwest once again, eventually reaching Toulon without further incident on 22 July. Ganteaume used the capture of Swiftsure to excuse the failure of his effort to reinforce Egypt, which was invaded and captured by a British expeditionary force in the spring and summer of 1801. While in captivity, Hallowell wrote a letter that was published in Britain praising the treatment he and his men had received while prisoners of war under Ganteaume, and he and his officers were released on parole the following month. On 18 August they faced a court martial on board HMS Genereux at Mahón in Menorca to investigate the loss of their ship, and were all honourably cleared of any blame. He was also praised for detaching the convoy, which otherwise might have also been lost. Hallowell subsequently returned to naval service in 1803 at the start the Napoleonic Wars, operating in the Caribbean and Mediterranean and eventually becoming a rear-admiral in 1811. Swiftsure, one of only five British ships of the line to be captured by the French during the entire war, was subsequently commissioned into the French Navy and remained in service for the next four years until recaptured at the Battle of Trafalgar in 1805.

== Bibliography ==
- Clowes, William Laird (1997) [1900]. The Royal Navy, A History from the Earliest Times to 1900, Volume IV. London: Chatham Publishing. ISBN 1-86176-013-2.
- Gardiner, Robert, ed. (2001) [1996]. Nelson Against Napoleon. London: Caxton Editions. ISBN 1-86176-026-4.
- James, William (2002) [1827]. The Naval History of Great Britain, Volume 3, 1800–1805. London: Conway Maritime Press. ISBN 0-85177-907-7.
- Woodman, Richard (2001). The Sea Warriors. London: Constable Publishers. ISBN 1-84119-183-3.
- Quintin, Danielle et Bernard (2003). Dictionnaire des capitaines de Vaisseau de Napoléon. S.P.M. ISBN 2-901952-42-9.
