= Benjamin Hallowell Carew =

Royal Navy officer (1761–1834)

Admiral of the Blue Sir Benjamin Hallowell Carew GCB
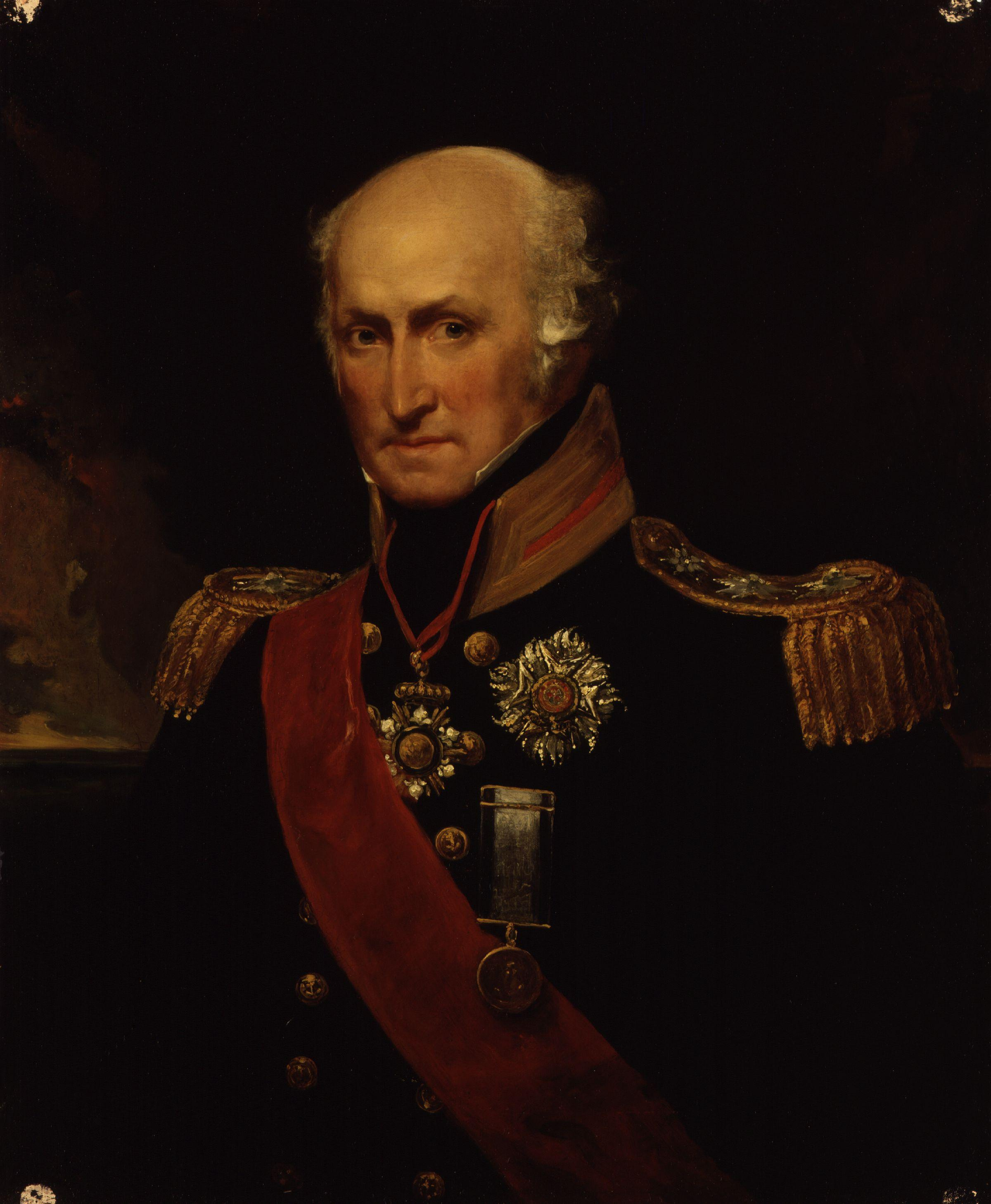
- Portrait by John Hayter, c. 1833
- Born: 1 January 1761; Probably Boston, Massachusetts
- Died: 2 September 1834 (aged 73); Beddington Park, Wallington, London
- Relatives: Ann Inglefield (wife)
- Military career
- Allegiance: Great Britain; United Kingdom
- Branch: Royal Navy
- Service years: c. 1781–1834
- Rank: Admiral of the Blue
- Commands: HMS Scorpion; HMS Camel; HMS Robust; HMS Courageux; HMS Lowestoffe; HMS Lively; HMS Swiftsure; HMS Argo; HMS Tigre; Cork Station; Nore Command
- Conflicts: American War of Independence; Battle of the Chesapeake; Battle of Saint Kitts; Battle of the Saintes; Battle of the Mona Passage; French Revolutionary Wars; Siege of Toulon (1793); Siege of Bastia; Siege of Calvi; Battle of the Hyères Islands; Battle of Cape St. Vincent (1797); Battle of the Nile; Action of 7 April 1800; Action of 24 June 1801; Napoleonic Wars; Caribbean campaign of 1803–1810; Trafalgar campaign; Alexandria expedition of 1807; Peninsular War
- Awards: Colonel of Marines; Order of Saint Ferdinand and Merit (Naples)

Admiral of the Blue Sir Benjamin Hallowell Carew GCB (born Benjamin Hallowell; 1 January 1761 – 2 September 1834) was a Royal Navy officer. He was one of the select group of officers, referred to by Lord Nelson as his "Band of Brothers", who served with him at the Battle of the Nile.

== Early years ==
Although he is often identified as Canadian, Hallowell's place and exact date of birth have been the subject of dispute among researchers. He was possibly born on 1 January 1761 in Boston, Massachusetts, where his British father, former naval captain Benjamin Hallowell III, was Commissioner of the Board of Customs. His mother, Mary (Boylston) Hallowell, was the daughter of Thomas Boylston, and a first cousin of Susanna Boylston, the mother of the 2nd President of the United States, John Adams, and grandmother of the 6th President, John Quincy Adams. He was a brother of Ward Nicholas Boylston and a nephew of Governor Moses Gill.

His father's job exposed Hallowell's Loyalist family to attacks as American revolutionary sentiment grew. In August 1765 the Hallowell house in Roxbury was ransacked by a mob and the family relocated to Jamaica Plain and in September 1774 his father was pursued by a furious mob of 160 mounted men who had gathered to hear news of the resignation of other customs officials. The family left the country in March 1776, at the outbreak of the American Revolutionary War, and their estates were stolen. They stayed for a short time in Halifax, Nova Scotia, then took a passage to England in July 1776.

Educated in the private schools of England, through his father's connections with Admiral Samuel Hood, 1st Viscount Hood, Hallowell entered the Royal Navy at a slightly later age than was normal, receiving his promotion to lieutenant on 31 August 1781.

== Naval career ==
Benjamin Hallowell's naval career spanned the American Revolutionary War, the French Revolutionary Wars and the Napoleonic Wars, and he took part in a number of important actions in all three. As a lieutenant in Admiral Lord Hood's fleet, he saw action in the Battles of St. Kitts and the Saintes in 1782. He continued on active service after the end of the war. In late 1790 he was promoted to the rank of commander into HMS Scorpion, which he then sailed to the coast of Africa. Commissioned as a post-captain in August 1793, he and his ship took part in the evacuation following the Siege of Toulon in that year. He was involved in the Siege of Bastia under the command of Lord Hood, and then as a volunteer at the capture of Calvi, Corsica, in 1794 (in which Nelson lost the sight of his right eye); he was mentioned in despatches by Lord Hood for his part in this action, and was subsequently given command of HMS Lowestoffe.

By 1795 he was in command of HMS Courageux, and took part with her in the Battle of Hyères. He was not aboard in December 1796 when the vessel was wrecked after an incident in the Bay of Gibraltar during bad weather. Her mooring cable parted and she was driven within range of Spanish shore batteries; Hallowell, ashore to sit at a court-martial, was denied permission to rejoin the ship and take her to safety. She was subsequently wrecked off Monte Hacho in high winds during her officers' attempts to move to a safer anchorage, with the loss of 464 lives.

Following her loss, Hallowell served as a volunteer aboard HMS Victory during the Battle of Cape St. Vincent (1797). Admiral Sir John Jervis commended Hallowell to the Admiralty by for his actions during the battle. Jervis, a stern and imposing figure, informed of the superior odds facing him, he expressed determination to attack no matter how strong the opposition; Hallowell, standing with Jervis on the deck of Victory, reportedly expressed loud approbation and thumped his commander-in-chief on the back in a startling display of familiarity. Subsequently, Hallowell received command of HMS Lively.

=== Capture ===
On 10 June 1801 Hallowell encountered Pigmy and from her learned that a French squadron under Admiral Ganteaume had put to sea. Hallowell decided to return to reinforce Sir John Warren's squadron, but on 24 June Swiftsure encountered Ganteaume. The faster French squadron, consisting of four ships of the line and a frigate, overtook the already damaged and slow, as well as undermanned, Swiftsure. Indivisible and Dix-Août succeeded in shooting away Swiftsure's yards and masts, crippling her and so forcing Hallowell to surrender. Swiftsure had two men killed, two men mortally wounded, and another six wounded; the French lost 33 killed and wounded.

On his repatriation, Hallowell received the court-martial that was automatic for a Royal Navy captain who had lost his ship, but was honourably acquitted. Meanwhile the French Navy took Swiftsure into service under her own name.

=== Nelson's coffin ===
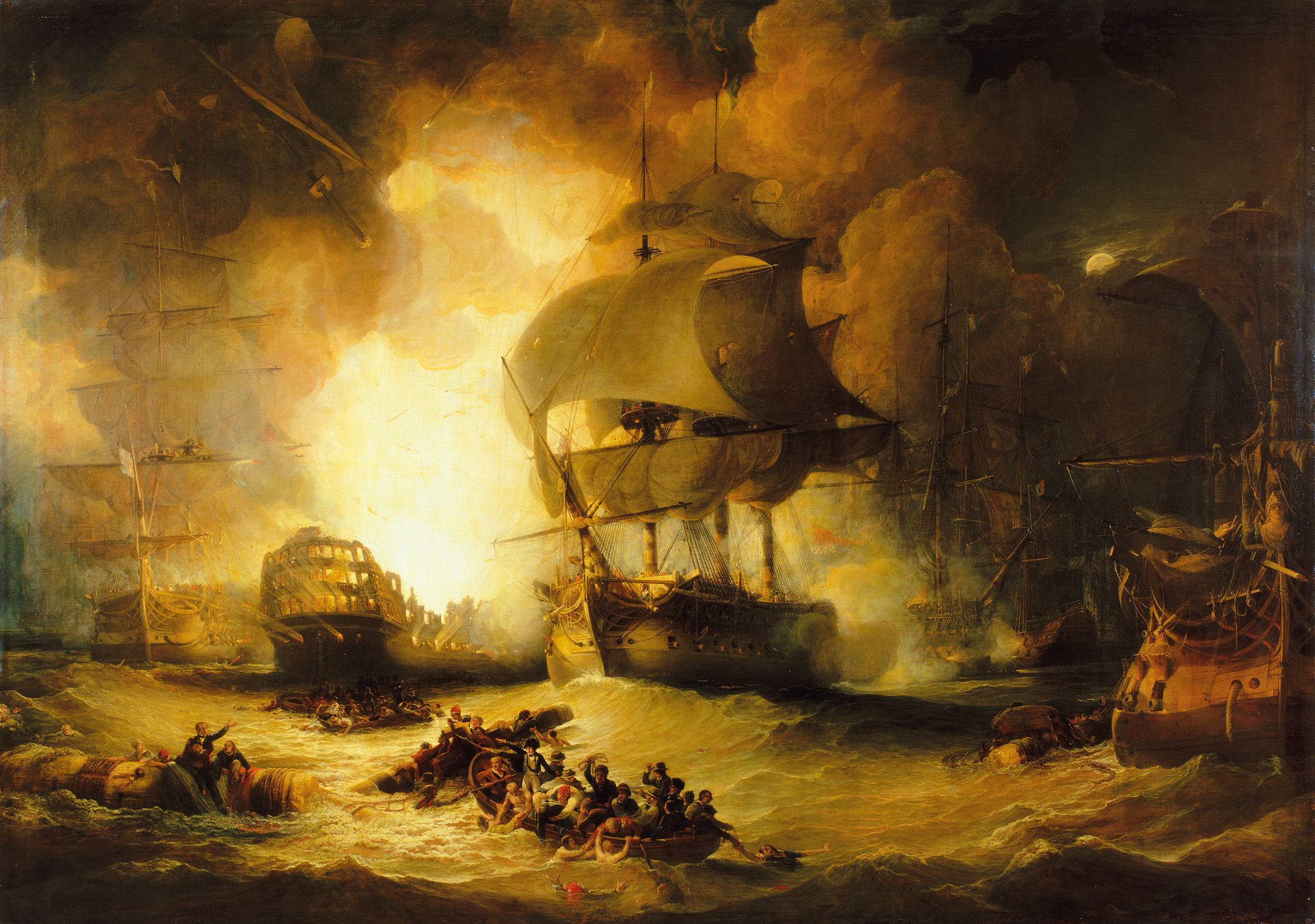
L'Orient is destroyed at the Battle of the Nile. The ship in the centre, firing into L'Orient at close quarters, is Swiftsure, commanded by Hallowell. Painting by George Arnald (1763–1841).

Hallowell is probably best known as the man who made Nelson a present of what would become his own coffin, after the Battle of the Nile in August 1798. Hallowell commanded HMS Swiftsure, a 74-gun ship of the line, during the battle. Swiftsure engaged the French flagship L'Orient at close quarters and played a major role in her destruction. Some time later Hallowell sent Nelson a coffin Hallowell had ordered to be made from a salvaged piece of L'Orient's mainmast, with an accompanying note:

Sir, I have taken the liberty of presenting you a coffin made from the main mast of L'Orient, that when you have finished your military career in this world you may be buried in one of your trophies. But that that period may be far distant is the earnest wish of your sincere friend, Benjamin Hallowell

— "The Life of Horatio, Lord Nelson", Robert Southey, Chapter V

Nelson is said to have been pleased with the gift, keeping it propped against the wall of his cabin for some time, behind the chair in which he sat for dinner, and taking it with him to his next command. After Nelson was killed in 1805 during the Battle of Trafalgar, he was buried in the coffin Hallowell had given him.

Hallowell himself, now in command of HMS Tigre, missed the Battle of Trafalgar. Nelson had sent Tigre, along with five other vessels in his squadron, to Gibraltar for water and on convoy duty. However his old command, Swiftsure, took part on the French side. She and her officers and crew, including Hallowell, had been captured in 1801 after a fight with a squadron of five French warships. Hallowell faced a court-martial over this incident when he was returned to England after a short time as a prisoner of war, but he was honorably acquitted of any failure of duty.

Hallowell remained a serving naval officer after Nelson's death and went on to be Commander-in-Chief, Cork Station in 1818 and Commander-in-Chief, The Nore in 1821. He was promoted to the rank of Rear-Admiral of the Blue on 1 August 1811; Rear-Admiral of the White in 1812; Vice-Admiral of the Blue on 12 August 1819; Vice-Admiral of the White on 19 July 1821; and Admiral of the Blue in 1830.

== Honours ==
Hallowell was awarded the Neapolitan Order of Saint Ferdinand and Merit for his actions during the siege of Corsica, an honour also presented to Nelson. He was appointed a Colonel of Royal Marines on 31 July 1810, and was number 61 amongst those appointed Knight Commander of the Order of the Bath (KCB) in the restructuring of the Order on 2 January 1815, and promoted to Knight Grand Cross of the Order of the Bath (GCB) on 6 June 1831.

== Inheritance and change of name in later life ==
In 1828, Sir Benjamin Hallowell succeeded to the estates of the Carew family of Beddington, Surrey, on the death of his cousin, who had herself inherited them from her brother-in-law. In accordance with the terms of her will, he assumed the addition surname of Carew after his patronym as well as quartering the coat of arms of Carew (differenced) with those of Hallowell, becoming known as Admiral Sir Benjamin Hallowell Carew (or Hallowell-Carew).He died on 2 September 1834.

In person he was the exact cut of a sailor, five feet eight or nine inches high, stout and muscular, but not at all corpulent. His countenance was open, manly, and benevolent, with bright, clear grey eyes, which, if turned inquiringly upon you, seemed to read your most secret thoughts. His mouth was pleasing and remarkably handsome, but indicative of decision and strength of character; and his thinly scattered hair, powdered, and tied in a cue [sic] after the old fashion, displayed, in all its breadth, his high and massive forehead, upon which unflinching probity and sterling good sense seemed to have taken their stand.

— Abraham Crawford, Reminiscences of a Naval Officer, during the Late War with Sketches and Anecdotes of Distinguished Commanders. London, Henry Colburn, 1851

Hallowell-Carew married Ann Inglefield, daughter of John Nicholson Inglefield. They were the parents of Captain Charles Hallowell-Carew R.N., who married Mary Murray Maxwell, daughter of Sir Murray Maxwell and great granddaughter of Sir Alexander Maxwell, 2nd Bt., of Myrton Castle, Wigtownshire.

== Arms ==
Coat of arms of Hallowell-Carew
Crest The round-top of a mainmast Or, therefrom issuant a demi lion Sable between six spears Gold, the points upwards, Argent and for distinction the lion charged with an anchor, also Gold (Carew); Out of a naval crown Or, a demi lion, gardant, Proper, charged on the body with an anchor erect Sable and supporting with the paws a trident, erect, Gold. Escutcheon Quarterly; first and fourth: Or, three lions, passant in pale, Sable and for distinction an anchor erect in canton of the Last; second and third: Argent on a chevron Sable, an anchor erect Or, between two bezants ; a chief wavy Azure, thereon a naval crown of the Third, between a representation of the gold medal presented by command of His late Majesty to the said Sir Benjamin Hallowell, after the battle of the Nile in the year 1798, pendent from a ribbon of the First, fimbriated of the Fourth, subinscribed Nile in letters of gold on the dexter, and a representation of the cross of a commander of the Royal Sicilian Order of St. Ferdinand and of Merit, pendent from a ribbon Azure fimbriated Gules on the sinister; conferred on Sir Benjamin Hallowell upon the institution of the said Order in the year 1800. Supporters On either side an heraldic antelope Gules, gorged with a naval crown, and charged on the shoulder with an anchor erect Or.

Military offices
Preceded by Herbert Sawyer	Commander-in-Chief, Cork Station; 1816–1818	Succeeded by Josias Rowley
Preceded by Sir John Gore	Commander-in-Chief, The Nore; 1821–1824	Succeeded by Sir Robert Moorsom
