= Louis-Marie Le Gouardun =

Louis-Marie Le Gouardun (Note: Sometimes written Leguardun.) (Lorient, 9 September 1753 — Lorient, 18 December 1814) was a French Navy officer. Starting his career in the French East India Company, he served under Suffren in the Indian Ocean during the Anglo-French War, and later in important actions of the French Revolutionary Wars. He commanded Dix-Août during her victorious Action of 24 June 1801 against Swiftsure. After serving through the First French Empire, Le Gouardun was forcibly retired at the Bourbon Restoration.

== Biography ==
Born to Louise Péruchon and Renée-Marie Le Gouardun, an officer of the French East India Company, Louis-Marie Le Gouardun started sailing in 1771 of the East indiaman Laverdy, which his father captained. He rose in the ranks of the company, sailing on Brune as an ensign in 1774–1775, and on Thérèse as a lieutenant in 1778–1779.

On 22 August 1779, Le Gouardun joined the French Royal Navy as a frigate lieutenant on the 80-gun Orient. In 1781, he transferred to the 64-gun Ajax, on Pourvoyeuse the next year, and on Annibal in April 1782. He took part and was wounded in both the Battle of Providien and the Battle of Cuddalore.

With the Peace of Paris and the end of the Anglo-French War, Le Gouardun returned to the East India Company as first officier on Langivilliers, which he captained on the return journey. In 1789, he commanded Chasseur, and on Indien in 1792, returning in 1794.

With the French Revolutionary Wars raging, Le Gouardun was accepted in the Navy as an Enseigne de vaisseau non entretenu on Vertu. Promoted to captain 3rd class on 2 November 1794, he was appointed to command the 110-gun Révolutionnaire. On 29 December 1794, Révolutionnaire (ex-Bretagne), departed from Brest for the Croisière du Grand Hiver, where she sustained severe structural damage from the foul weather. She limped back to Brest on 2 February 1795, her hull leaking heavily, and was broken up afterwards. Le Gouardun transferred to the 74-gun Jean Bart.

Commanding Jean Bart, Le Gouardun took part in the Battle of Groix, where a falling pulley severely wounded him. The first officer had to assume command. Le Gouardun underwent a court-martial and was acquitted on 21 August 1795.

In December 1797, Le Gouardun took command of Loire, and transferred on Fraternité the year after. In 1800, he was given command to the 74-gun Convention. On 11 March 1800, Le Gouardun took command of the brand new 80-gun Indivisible, commissioning the ship.

On 10 March 1801, Le Gouardun transferred on the 74-gun Dix-Août. In the action of 24 June 1801, Dix-Août and Indivisible captured Swiftsure.

On 9 August 1803, Le Gouardun was given command of Jean Bart again. He rose to captain first class on 1 January 1807, and left Jean Bart on 26 May 1808. From then on, he served ashore in Lorient.

At the Bourbon Restoration, Le Gouardun was forcibly retired, although he was made a Knight in the Order of Saint Louis on 18 August 1814.

== Notes and references ==
Notes

Bibliography

- Forrer, Claude (June 1996). "La Bretagne, vaisseau de 100 canons, 1762-1796". Neptunia (202): 13–21.
- Mancel, Émile. Le Capitaine de Vaisseau Le Gouardun (in French).
- Quintin, Danielle; Quintin, Bernard (2003). Dictionnaire des capitaines de Vaisseau de Napoléon (in French). S.P.M. ISBN 2-901952-42-9.
- Roche, Jean-Michel (2005). Dictionnaire des bâtiments de la flotte de guerre française de Colbert à nos jours. Vol. 1. Group Retozel-Maury Millau. ISBN 978-2-9525917-0-6. OCLC 165892922. (1671-1870)
- Troude, Onésime-Joachim (1867). Batailles navales de la France (in French). Vol. 2. Challamel ainé.
