= Ganteaume =

Ganteaume is a surname. Notable people with the surname include:

- Andy Ganteaume (1921–2016), Trinidadian cricketer
- Honoré Joseph Antoine Ganteaume (1755–1818), French Navy officer
  - Ganteaume's expeditions of 1801, three connected major French Navy operations of the spring of 1801 during the French Revolutionary Wars
