= HMS Sprightly (1778) =

Cutter of the Royal Navy

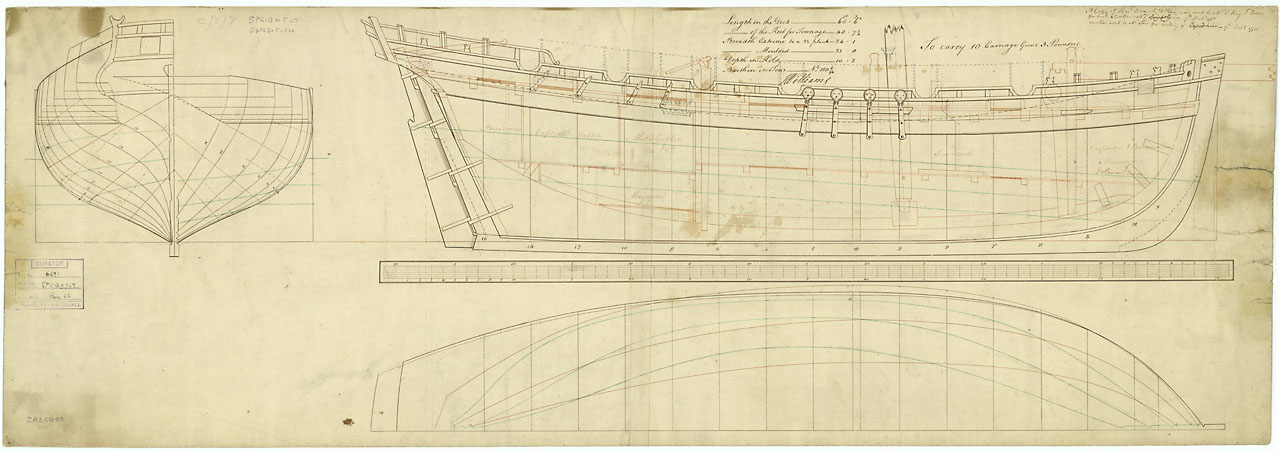
- Sprightly

History

Great Britain
- Name: HMS Sprightly
- Builder: Thomas King, Dover
- Launched: 4 August 1778
- Fate: Captured in 1801

General characteristics
- Class & type: Sprightly-class cutter
- Tons burthen: 15062/94 bm
- Length: Overall: 66 ft (20 m); Keel:48 ft 6 in (14.8 m)
- Beam: 24 ft (7.32 m)
- Depth of hold: 10 ft (3.0 m)
- Propulsion: Sails
- Sail plan: Cutter
- Complement: 50 (later 60)
- Armament: Initially: 10 × 3-pounder guns + 12 × ½-pound swivel guns; Later:12 × 12-pounder carronades

HMS Sprightly was a 10-gun cutter of the Royal Navy, built to a design by John Williams, and the name ship of her two-vessel class of cutters. She was launched in 1778. The French captured and scuttled her off the Andulasian coast in 1801.

== American War of Independence ==
Sprightly shared with the frigate Amphitrite, sloop Fairy, and the cutters Griffin, Flying Fish, and Wells, in the capture on 24 May 1779 of the French privateers Dunkerque and Prince de Robcq, which had "eight ransomers" aboard.

Sprightly was one of the vessels that shared in the award to the squadron of £15,000 for her role in the Affair of Fielding and Bylandt. This was a brief naval engagement off the Isle of Wight on 31 December 1779 between a Royal Navy squadron under the command of Commodore Charles Fielding, and a naval squadron of the Dutch Republic under the command of Rear-admiral Lodewijk van Bylandt, which was escorting a Dutch convoy.

On 27 March 1780, Sprightly, under the command of Lieutenant Gabriel Bray, and another cutter, Resolution captured the cutter Larke.

Next, Sprightly, Resolution, and the tender Union captured the brig Susanna on 8 April.

On 25 December 1780, Sprightly was in company with the sloop Fortune. She therefore shared in the proceeds of the capture on that day of Noord Star.

Sprightly, was among the vessels that shared in the proceeds of the capture of the Dutch warship Princess Caroline on 30 December.

Around 2 January 1781 the cutters Sprightly, Repulse, and Expedition brought several captured Dutch vessels into The Downs.

== French Revolutionary Wars ==
On 23 March 1794 Sprightly put into the Scilly Islands, together with a convoy of some 200 merchant vessels and their other escorts.

In October 1794 Lieutenant Robert Jump assumed command of Sprightly.

Sprightly was either at Plymouth, or assigned to the port on 20 January 1795. Consequently, she shared in the prize money for the Dutch warships, East Indiamen, and merchant vessels that were there too and that the British seized.

On 3 July 1795 Melampus and Hebe intercepted a convoy of 13 vessels off St Malo. Melampus captured an armed brig and Hebe captured six merchant vessels. The brig of war was armed with four 24-pounders and had a crew of 60 men. Later she was identified as the 4-gun Vésuve. One of the merchant vessels was Abeille. The convoy had been on its way from Île-de-Bréhat to Brest. Seaflower, Daphne and Sprightly shared in the prize and head money.

Sprightly arrived at Plymouth on 23 March 1797. Two days earlier she had encountered two French privateers, one of 14 guns and one of six, and engaged them for an hour. Apparently both sides disengaged. The French had with them three British brigs that they had captured.

In January 1799 Jump sailed Sprightly for Jamaica. Later that year Sprightly and the brig Spitfire captured the brig Gute Hoffnung. At some point between 6 May 1799 and 1 June 1799, Sprightly captured the French schooner Esperance, of six guns and 22 men. Esperance had been carrying a cargo of sugar and coffee from Cap François to St Thomas. At some point between 28 February and 20 May 1800, Sprighlty was on the Spanish Main where she captured a Spanish brig loaded with fustic.

Jump and Sprightly arrived at Plymouth from Jamaica on 19 September 1800. They brought mails and passengers and had taken only 45 days for the voyage.

== Fate ==
On 20 January 1801, Sprightly left Plymouth, as did a number of other cutters, under orders to stop all Danish, Swedish, and Russian vessels.

Next, Sprightly was on her way to Gibraltar with dispatches when she had the misfortune to encounter a French squadron under Admiral Ganteaume about 40 miles south-west of Cape de Gata. During one of his expeditions, Ganteaume had called his squadron to a halt there. After a two-hour chase, Sprightly struck to the 74-gun Dix-août on 10 February 1801. The French scuttled their prey.

On 26 February two French brigs arrived at Plymouth carrying wine and brandy. Sprightly and Incendiary had captured them before falling prey to Ganteaume.

On her way back from Rhodes the hired armed lugger Speedwell stopped at Mahón. There she took on board as a passenger Lieutenant Jump, whom she carried to Plymouth. Jump underwent a court martial on 6 May aboard HMS Gladiator for the loss of his vessel and was acquitted.
