= French frigate Aglaé =

History

France
- Name: Aglaé
- Namesake: Pasithea
- Ordered: 4 November 1786
- Builder: Brest
- Laid down: 1787
- Launched: 6 May 1788
- Commissioned: 1788
- Decommissioned: September 1802
- Renamed: Fraternité on 28 September 1793
- Fate: Lost at sea

General characteristics
- Type: 32-gun frigate
- Displacement: 1200 tonneaux
- Tons burthen: 700 port tonneaux
- Length: 44.2 m (145 ft 0 in)
- Beam: 11.2 m (36 ft 9 in)
- Draught: 5.3 m (17 ft 5 in)
- Armament: 26 × 12-pounder long guns; 10 × 6-pounder long guns; 2 howitzers

Aglaé was a 32-gun frigate of the French Navy, built to a design by P. Duhamel.

== Service ==
During the Revolutionary wars, she was used to ferry troops to the Caribbean, and spent two years on station at Saint Domingue. In 1793, she undertook a refit, after which she was renamed Fraternité.

Under lieutenant de vaisseau Gourrège, she cruised off Spain, and later she took part in the Battle of Groix on 23 June 1795 under lieutenant de vaisseau Florinville.

During the winter 1796, she took part in the Croisière du Grand Hiver under vice-admiral Morard de Galles. On 30 December, she helped Révolution in rescuing the crew of Scevola, which foundered in the tempest off Ireland. Fraternité returned to Rochefort on 14 January 1797.

On 22 September 1798, Captain Louis-Marie Le Gouardun took command, until 5 October of the same year.

== Fate ==
She was lost at sea in August 1802, as she sailed from Saint Domingue to France.

== Notes and references ==
=== Bibliography ===
- Demerliac, Alain (2004). La Marine de Louis XVI: Nomenclature des Navires Français de 1774 à 1792 (in French). Éditions Ancre. ISBN 2-906381-23-3.
- Quintin, Danielle; Quintin, Bernard (2003). Dictionnaire des capitaines de Vaisseau de Napoléon (in French). S.P.M. ISBN 2-901952-42-9. OCLC 165892922.
- Roche, Jean-Michel (2005). Dictionnaire des bâtiments de la flotte de guerre française de Colbert à nos jours. Vol. 1. Group Retozel-Maury Millau. ISBN 978-2-9525917-0-6. OCLC 165892922. (1671-1870)
- Troude, Onésime-Joachim (1867). Batailles navales de la France (in French). Vol. 2. Challamel ainé.
