= Hired armed cutter Sandwich =

History

Great Britain
- Name: Sandwich
- Acquired: 22 May 1798 by lease
- Captured: 14 June 1799

France
- Name: Sandwich
- Acquired: 14 June 1799 by capture
- Captured: 15 October 1803

United Kingdom
- Name: HMS Sandwich
- Acquired: 1804 by purchase
- Fate: Sold 1805

General characteristics
- Type: Cutter
- Tons burthen: 11090/94, or 113 (bm)
- Length: 66 ft 6 in (20.3 m) (overall); 51 ft 6 in (15.7 m) (keel)
- Beam: 20 ft 4 in (6.2 m)
- Depth of hold: 8 ft 6 in (2.6 m)
- Propulsion: Sails
- Armament: Contract: 2 × 4-pounder guns + 10 × 12-pounder carronades; French Navy: 8 × 4-pounder guns.

His Majesty's Hired armed cutter Sandwich served the Royal Navy from 23 May 1798 until the French frigate Créole captured her on 14 June 1799. She then served in the French Navy until the Royal Navy recaptured her on 15 October 1803. The Navy purchased her in 1804 and she served for some months in 1805 as HMS Sandwich before she was sold in Jamaica. During this period she captured three small French privateers in two days.

== British service ==
On 14 October 1798 Sandwich captured the Dutch hoy Hoop and her cargo. HMS Wolverine was in sight.

== Capture ==
Sandwich was under the command of Lieutenant George Lempriere and cruising off the coast of Barcelona on 14 June 1799 when she sighted a large fleet. Lempriere believed the vessels to be a British fleet and sailed towards them. When the strange vessels did not reply to the recognition signals, Lempriere realized that they were enemy vessels and attempted to sail away. The French fleet detached a lugger, possibly Affronteur, to pursue Sandwich. A frigate joined the lugger in pursuit and towards evening the lugger opened fire with her bow chasers. The frigate then too opened fire, with Sandwich returning fire as best she could. By 1a.m. the frigate was within musket shot of Sandwich and any further resistance would have been futile. Lempriere then struck to Créole.

== French service ==
The French Navy took Sandwich into service, retaining her existing name. She was stationed at Lorient in August 1799. She then served in the French Navy until 1803.

== Recapture and Royal Navy service ==
HMS Pique, Captain William Cumberland, and HMS Pelican, Lieutenant Henry Whitby, accepted the capitulation of the French garrison, and eight French brigs and schooners at Aux Cayes in Saint-Domingue on 15 October 1803. Among the French vessels were the French 16-gun brig-sloop Goéland, and Sandwich. (Note: One report has the Admiralty then returning Sandwich to her previous owners. However, the Admiralty would have already compensated the owners for their loss.)

In 1804 the Royal Navy purchased the cutter Sandwich at Jamaica. It commissioned her under Lieutenant G. Bernarding in 1805.

On 21 April 1805, Captain Charles Dashwood of HMS Bacchante instructed Bernarding to take Sandwich out on a cruise. On 6 May Sandwich was on the Bahama Banks, about eight leagues from West Caicos. She was in company with the schooner Nassau when together they encountered the French privateer schooner Renomée. (Note: Nassau's status is unclear. She is not listed on the rolls of the Royal Navy. She may have been a vessel briefly acquired locally, perhaps by capture, or a privateer.) Renomée was armed with one long 9-pounder gun and two 4-pounders, and had a crew of 56 men.

The next day Sandwich and Nassau captured the privateer Rencontre. Rencontre was armed with two 4-pounder guns and had a crew of 42 men. That same day the British vessels captured Vénus, which was armed with one gun and had a crew of 35 men. Bernarding would have liked to continue to cruise but felt obliged to cut his cruise short because of the number of prisoners he had taken.

== Fate ==
The Navy sold Sandwich in Jamaica in 1805.
