= French ship Apollon =

Five ships of the French Navy have borne the name Apollon:

- Apollon (1671–1678), a 42-gun ship of the line
- Apollon (1683–1716), a 50-gun ship of the line
- Apollon (1740–1758), a 56-gun ship of the line
- Apollon (1788–1797), a Téméraire-class ship of the line
