= Honoré Joseph Antoine Ganteaume =

French Navy officer (1755–1818)

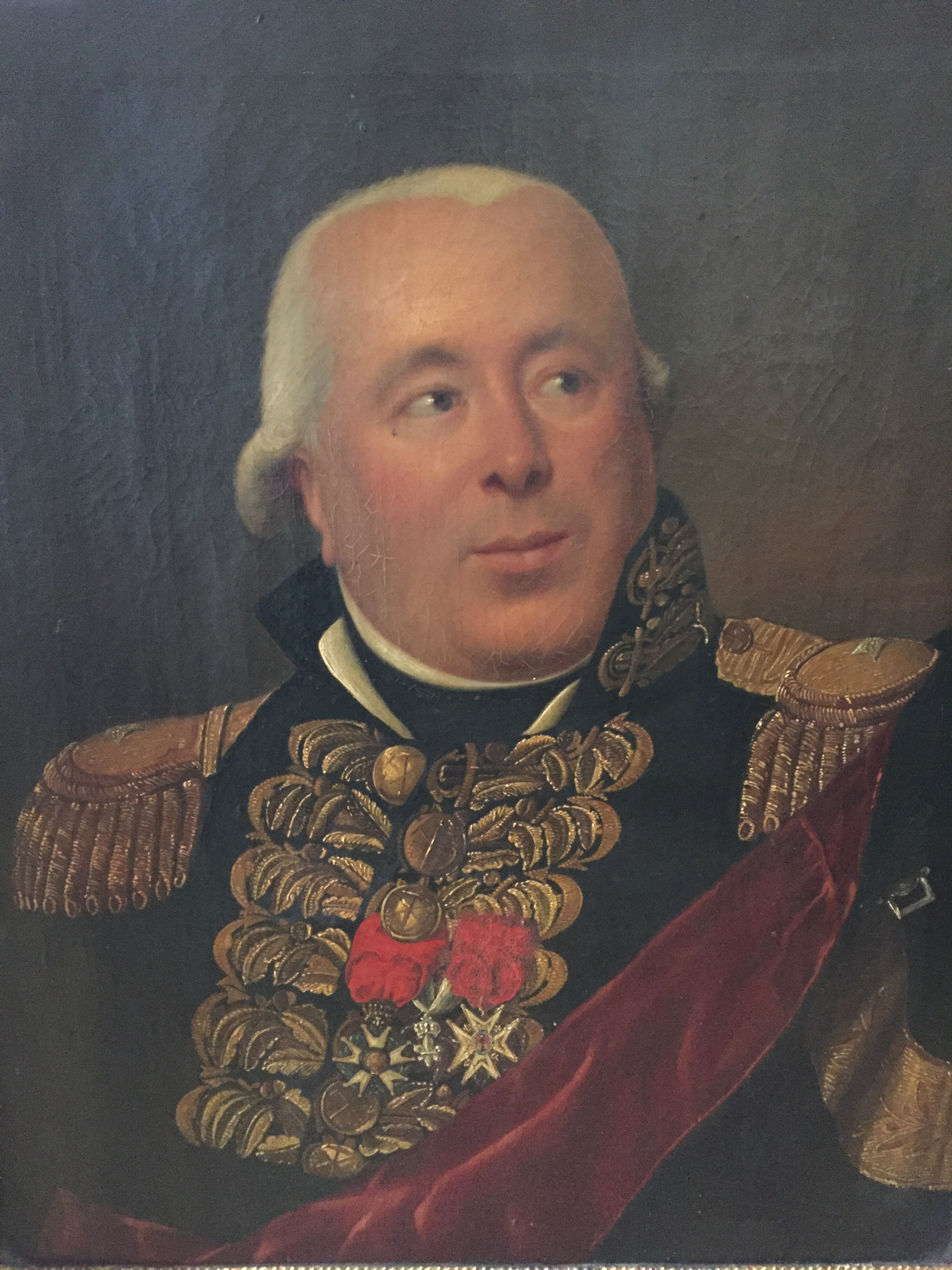
- Portrait of Ganteaume
- Born: 13 April 1755; La Ciotat, Provence
- Died: 28 July 1818 (aged 63); Aubagne, Provence
- Military career
- Allegiance: Kingdom of France; French First Republic; First French Empire
- Branch: French Navy; French Imperial Navy
- Service years: 1778–1818
- Rank: Vice admiral
- Units: Fier Rodrigue; Surveillante; Jupiter; Orient
- Commands: Marlborough; Trente-et-un Mai; Muiron
- Conflicts: American Revolutionary War; Capture of Grenada (1779); Siege of Savannah (1779); French Revolutionary Wars; Glorious First of June (WIA); Croisière du Grand Hiver; Battle of the Hyères Islands; Battle of the Nile (WIA); Ganteaume's expeditions of 1801; Napoleonic Wars
- Awards: Commander of the Order of Saint Louis

Vice-Admiral Honoré Joseph Antoine Ganteaume (13 April 1755 – 28 July 1818) was a French Navy officer who served in the American Revolutionary War and French Revolutionary and Napoleonic Wars. Born in La Ciotat, Provence, he began his career at sea on East Indiamen before joining the Navy in 1778 during the American Revolutionary War and serving under Charles Henri Hector, Count of Estaing and Pierre André de Suffren. During the French Revolutionary Wars, Ganteaume was promoted to ship-of-the-line captain and served in the Glorious First of June and Croisière du Grand Hiver.

In 1798, Ganteaume took part in the French invasion of Egypt and Syria, narrowly escaping death during the catastrophic French defeat at the Battle of the Nile. In Egypt, he formed a personal relationship with Napoleon, who supported his career. Ganteaume was subsequently promoted to counter admiral and given command of a squadron to resupply the Army of the Orient. However, in Ganteaume's expeditions of 1801 he engaged in months of complicated manoeuvres to elude the Royal Navy and eventually failed in his mission.

Following a successful 1801 supply mission to French troops engaged in the Saint-Domingue expedition, Ganteaume was appointed as the maritime prefect of Toulon. During the Trafalgar campaign, he was ordered to lead his squadron to the Caribbean to reinforce the fleet of Admirals Pierre-Charles Villeneuve and Édouard Thomas Burgues de Missiessy, but was prevented from doing so by a British blockade. Ganteaume held various offices during the final years of the First French Empire before switching his loyalties to Louis XVIII during the Bourbon Restoration in France. He refused to support Napoleon during the Hundred Days in 1815, and died at his Provence estate in 1818.

== Early life ==
Honoré Joseph Antoine Ganteaume was born on 13 April 1755 in La Ciotat, Provence into a family of merchant sailors. He began his career at sea at the age of 14 on a merchantman commanded by his father, and by the time he reached the age of 22 Ganteaume had sailed on five voyages in the Middle East and two in the Caribbean. During his merchant career, he sailed on Fier Rodrigue, an East Indiaman of the Mississippi Company .

== American Revolutionary War ==
In 1778, France joined the American Revolutionary War on the side of the United States against Great Britain. Ganteaume was subsequently commissioned into the French Navy as an auxiliary officer, while Fier Rodrigue was purchased into naval service as a 54-gun ship of the line. Onboard Fier Rodrigue, Ganteaume escorted a French convoy to the Americas, and there the ship was attached to a division under Toussaint-Guillaume Picquet de la Motte in the fleet of Admiral Charles Henri Hector, Count of Estaing. Serving under Estaing, Ganteaume took part in the capture of Grenada and failed siege of Savannah.

In 1781, he was promoted to auxiliary frigate lieutenant, and appointed to command the fluyt Marlborough in a convoy bound for the East Indies and escorted by a fleet under Vice-Admiral Pierre André de Suffren. From 1781 to 1785, Ganteaume served on the frigate Surveillante in the East Indies. (Note: Michaud (p.98) also mentions the "frigate Apollon", but no ship by the name Apollon was in service in the French Navy between 1758 and 1788 (furthermore, Apollon is an unlikely name for a frigate and more suitable for a ship of the line).) He was promoted to fireship captain in 1784, and ship-of-the-line sub-lieutenant in 1786. The war had ended in 1783, and upon his return to France Ganteaume was granted permission to return to the service of the Mississippi Company. He successively commanded the Indiamen Maréchal de Ségur, which sailed to China, and Prince de Condé and Constitution, which sailed to the East Indies.

== French Revolutionary Wars ==
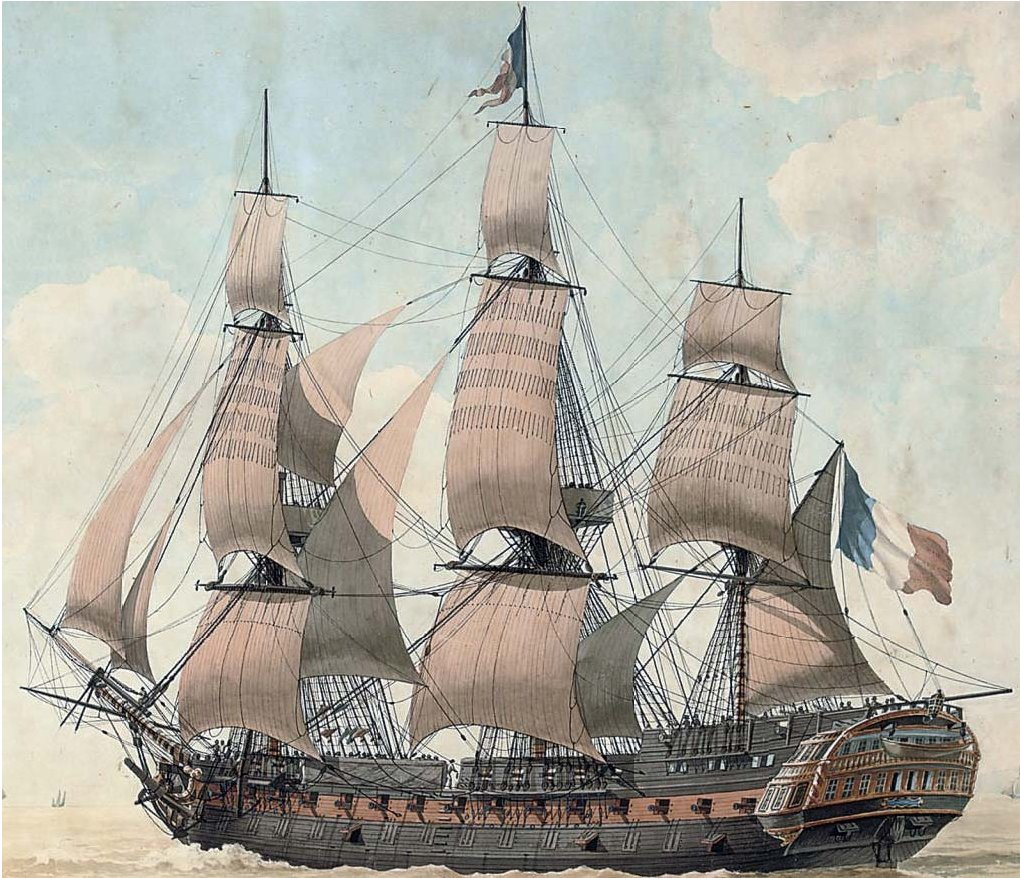
The 74-gun Trente-et-un Mai, which Ganteaume commanded between 1794 and 1795

In 1793, France declared war on Britain as part of the French Revolutionary Wars. As a consequence of the war, Ganteaume was captured by the British while on an East Indiaman and imprisoned before eventually being released and returning to France. There, he rejoined the French navy at the rank of ship-of-the-line lieutenant, serving on the 74-gun Jupiter in the Atlantic Ocean. Ganteaume was promoted to ship-of-the-line captain in 1794, and was appointed to command the 74-gun Trente-et-un Mai. During the Atlantic campaign of May 1794, he attempted to join forces with the French fleet under Vice-admiral Louis Thomas Villaret de Joyeuse, but only managed to do so at the Glorious First of June; Ganteaume took part in the final stages of the battle, where he was wounded thrice.

In the winter of 1794, Geanteaume captained Trente-et-un Mai in the Croisière du Grand Hiver, where he rescued the crew of the stricken Scipion. In 1795, Trente-et-un Mai sailed to the Mediterranean, and cruised off Catalonia, fighting an inconclusive two-hour battle against a Spanish Navy ship of the line. On 18 April, Trente-et-un Mai was renamed Républicain and was subsequently attached to the fleet under Vice-admiral Pierre Martin, taking part in the Battle of the Hyères Islands. In late 1795, Ganteaume was promoted to commodore and appointed to command a division of one ship of the line, four frigates and four corvettes in an expedition to Smyrna. He sailed to Smyrna and there lifted the British blockade on Ship-of-the-line Captain Pierre-Charles Villeneuve's squadron, capturing the frigate HMS Nemesis. In 1796, Ganteaume returned to the Atlantic Ocean and successfully ran the British blockade of Brest, escorting a convoy carrying munitions into the harbour.

=== Invasion of Egypt ===
In 1798, Ganteaume was appointed as the chief of staff to Counter-admiral Étienne Eustache Bruix, then serving as Minister of the Navy and the Colonies. France launched an invasion of Egypt in the same year, which Ganteaume participated onboard Orient, the flagship of the fleet which accompanied the invasion force's troopships. On 1 August, he fought in the Battle of the Nile, where most of the French fleet was destroyed by the Royal Navy. Ganteaume was wounded in action and narrowly escaped death when he left the burning Orient on a boat shortly before it blew up. In Egypt, he developed a relationship with Napoleon, the leader of the Army of the Orient who successfully requested that Ganteaume be promoted to counter admiral. Ganteaume subsequently led a small flotilla on the Nile, taking part in the siege of Jaffa, Siege of Acre and Battle of Abukir.

On 22 August 1799, Ganteaume departed Alexandria with a squadron consisting of the frigates Muiron and Carrère, the aviso Revanche and a tartane with the goal of secretly transporting Napoleon back to France. Napoleon ordered Ganteaume to sail close to the African shoreline to elude the British navy, and the squadron stopped off at Corsica before arriving at Fréjus on 2 October. Following his return to France, Napoleon overthrow the French Directory in the Coup of 18 Brumaire and became First Consul. He subsequently appointed Ganteaume to the Conseil d'État, in which the latter presided over naval affairs.

=== 1801 expeditions ===
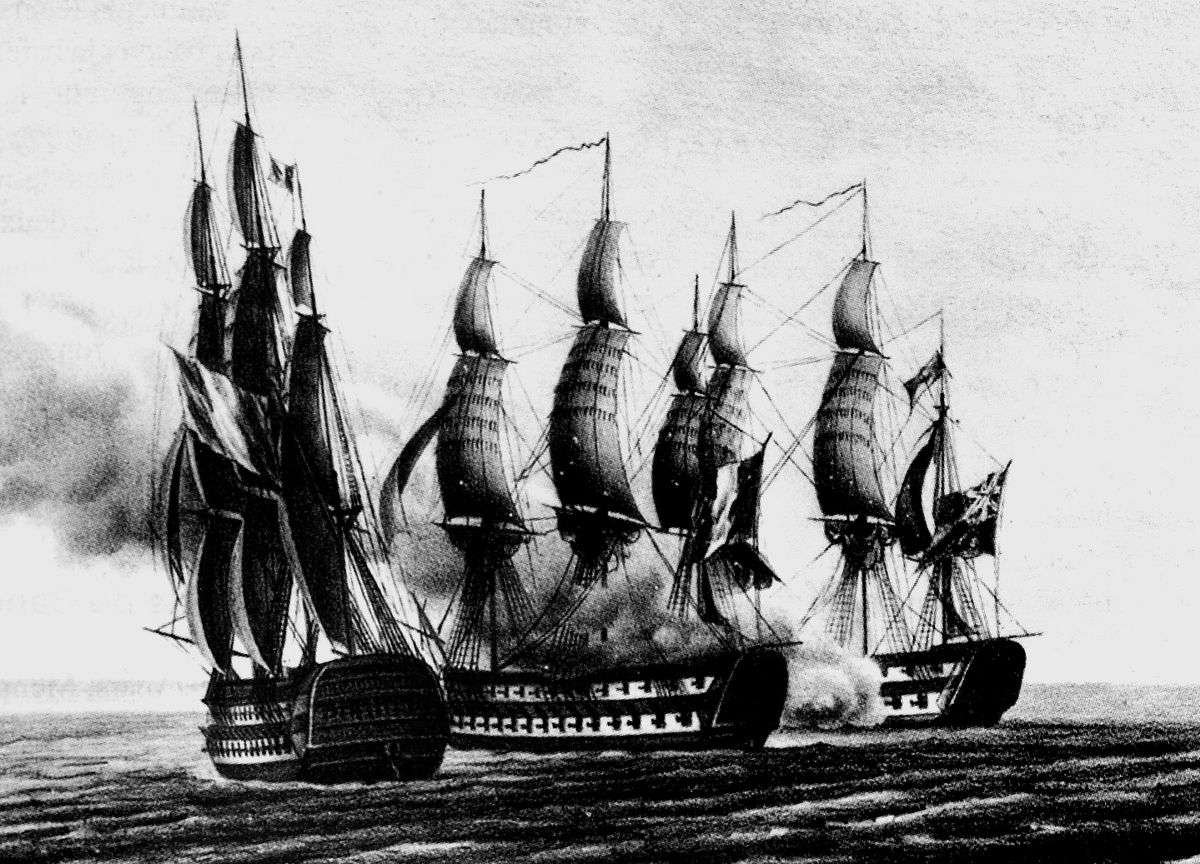
French illustration of the capture of HMS Swiftsure

In 1801, Ganteaume was appointed to command a seven-ship division in Brest and tasked with transporting supplies and 5,000 troops to the Army of the Orient. After successfully crossing British-held Gibraltar, his division cruised in the Mediterranean for six months to elude the British navy before returning to Toulon to resupply and repair his ships. In the following months, he attempted three sorties, once arriving off Alexandria without landing; when he arrived near Egypt in Derna, Libya in June 1801, the embarked troops did not land due to hostility from local inhabitants and the British naval threat. Ganteaume eventually gave up and returned to Toulon after having captured Elba and four British ships, including the 38-gun frigate HMS Success and on 24 June the 74-gun HMS Swiftsure. He failure motivated the satirical poem:

Vaisseaux lestés, tête sans lest,
Ainsi part l'amiral Ganteaume;
Il s'en va de Brest à Bertheaume,
Et revient de Bertheaume à Brest.

Loaded ships, head without weight,
Thus departs Admiral Ganteaume;
He sails off from Brest to Bertheaume,
And sails back from Bertheaume to Brest.

Following the signing of the Treaty of Lunéville in early 1801, which ended the War of the Second Coalition, Ganteaume led a resupply mission to Saint-Domingue, resupplying French troops engaged in the Saint-Domingue expedition. In 1802, Ganteaume was appointed as the maritime prefect of Toulon.

== Napoleonic Wars and death ==
Following the outbreak of the Napoleonic Wars in 1803, Napoleon was crowned as Napoleon I on 2 December 1804, transforming the French First Republic into the First French Empire. In this period, Ganteaume was promoted to vice admiral, appointed as a Count of the Empire by Napoleon and appointed to command the Brest fleet. In 1805, following Vice-admiral Louis-René Levassor de Latouche Tréville's death in 1804 and the beginning of the Trafalgar campaign in March 1805, Napoleon briefly considered entrusting Ganteaume to led an expedition to land 18,000 troops in Ireland in a repeat of the failed French expedition to Ireland in 1796. However, Ganteaume was instead ordered to go to the Caribbean to land reinforcements there before returning to Europe with the fleets of Counter-admiral Édouard Thomas Burgues de Missiessy and Villeneuve, by now a vice admiral. Adverse weather prevented Ganteaume from leaving Brest as planned, and he only departed a month after Missiessy's fleet. In transit, Ganteaume encountered the British Channel Fleet under Admiral William Cornwallis and retreated to Brest, where he was blockaded by Cornwallis's fleet. Informed of the Battle of Cape Finisterre, Ganteaume was ordered to break into the Atlantic by force to make his junction with Villeneuve; however, Villeneuve put his fleet into Cádiz, thwarting this plan.

In 1808, Ganteaume took command of the French squadrons at Toulon and Rochefort, which had been joined together at Toulon, with the intention of escorting a supply convoy to Corfu, then under a British naval blockade. He departed Toulon in early February and successfully escorted the convoy to Corfu before returning to Toulon in April. In June 1808, Ganteaume was appointed General Inspector of the Ocean Coasts. In February 1809, he authorised the frigates Pénélope and Pauline to chase HMS Proserpine, resulting in the action of 27 February 1809 in which Proserpine was captured and brought to Toulon. From 1809 to 1810, Ganteaume served as the Toulon's fleet commander, but gout kept him from his carrying out his duties. In 1810, he joined the Council of the Admiralty, and on 1 August 1811 Napoleon appointed Ganteaume as the colonel of the Sailors of the Imperial Guard.

In 1814, during the Bourbon Restoration in France, Ganteaume supported the Acte de déchéance de l'Empereur, which deposed Napoleon. As a result, he did not return to active duty when Napoleon returned from exile and was briefly restored to power during the Hundred Days. Immediately after the Battle of Waterloo, Ganteaume ordered the Royalist white flag to be hoisted in Toulon, which nearly got him killed by Napoleon's supporters. Following his second return to power, Louis XVIII granted Ganteaume a peerage in recognition for his loyalty. In December 1815, he was promoted to Commander of the Order of Saint Louis, and appointed General Inspector of the Classes. In his capacity as a peer, Ganteaume took part in the trial of Michel Ney, and voted for his execution. Ganteaume died at his estate, located near Aubagne, on 28 September 1818. The Boulevard Amiral Ganteaume in Aubagne is named after him, as is Gantheaume Point near Broome, Western Australia, which was named in 1801 by the explorer Nicolas Baudin.

== Notes and references ==
=== Bibliography ===
- Granier, Hubert (1998). Histoire des Marins français 1789–1815. illustrations by Alain Coz. Marines éditions. ISBN 2-909675-41-6.
- Levot, Prosper (1866). Les gloires maritimes de la France: notices biographiques sur les plus célèbres marins (in French). Bertrand.
- Mackesy, Piers (1995). British victory in Egypt, 1801: the end of Napoleon's conquest. London: Routledge. ISBN 0-415-04064-7.
- Michaud, Joseph François; Michaud, Louis Gabriel (1838). "Ganteaume". Biographie universelle, ancienne et moderne (in French). Vol. 65. Paris: Michaud. p. 98. OCLC 7840944.
- Roche, Jean-Michel (2005). Dictionnaire des bâtiments de la flotte de guerre française de Colbert à nos jours. Vol. 1. Group Retozel-Maury Millau. ISBN 978-2-9525917-0-6. OCLC 165892922.
- Strathern, Paul (2008). Napoleon in Egypt. New York: Bantam Books. ISBN 978-0-553-80678-6.

=== External links ===
- "Comte Honoré GANTEAUME" (in French). Archived from the original on 2007-03-22.
