= French ship Jean Bart (1790) =

Ship of the line of the French Navy

- Scale model of Achille, sister ship of French ship Jean Bart (1790), on display at the Musée national de la Marine in Paris.

History

France
- Name: Jean Bart
- Namesake: Jean Bart
- Builder: Lorient
- Laid down: 1 June 1788
- Launched: 7 November 1790
- Commissioned: March 1791
- Fate: Wrecked near Île Madame, 26 February 1809

General characteristics
- Class & type: Téméraire-class ship of the line
- Displacement: 3,069 tonneaux
- Tons burthen: 1,537 port tonneaux
- Length: 55.87 m (183 ft 4 in)
- Beam: 14.46 m (47 ft 5 in)
- Draught: 7.15 m (23.5 ft)
- Depth of hold: 7.15 m (23 ft 5 in)
- Sail plan: Full-rigged ship
- Crew: 705
- Armament: 74 guns: Lower gun deck: 28 × 36 pdr guns; Upper gun deck: 30 × 18 pdr guns; Forecastle and Quarterdeck: 16 × 8 pdr guns

Jean Bart was a 74-gun Téméraire-class ship of the line built for the French Navy during the 1780s. Completed in 1791, she played a minor role in the French Revolutionary Wars.

== Description ==
The Téméraire-class ships had a length of 55.87 metres (183 ft 4 in), a beam of 14.46 metres (47 ft 5 in) and a depth of hold of 7.15 metres (23 ft 5 in). The ships displaced 3,069 tonneaux and had a mean draught of 7.15 metres (23 ft 5 in). They had a tonnage of 1,537 port tonneaux. Their crew numbered 705 officers and ratings during wartime. They were fitted with three masts and ship rigged.

The muzzle-loading, smoothbore armament of the Téméraire class consisted of twenty-eight 36-pounder long guns on the lower gun deck, thirty 18-pounder long guns and thirty 18-pounder long guns on the upper gun deck. On the quarterdeck and forecastle were a total of sixteen 8-pounder long guns. Beginning with the ships completed after 1787, the armament of the Téméraires began to change with the addition of four 36-pounder obusiers on the poop deck (dunette). Some ships had instead twenty 8-pounders.

== Construction and career ==
Jean Bart was ordered on 19 October 1787 and laid down at the Arsenal de Lorient on 1 June 1788 to a design by Jacques-Noël Sané. The ship was launched on 7 November 1790 and completed in February 1791. In 1793, she was part of the squadron led by Van Stabel. Along with the Tigre, she rescued the Sémillante which was in danger of being captured by the British. She took part in the Atlantic campaign of May 1794, and in the capture of HMS Alexander on 6 November. She was also part of the Croisière du Grand Hiver winter campaign in 1794/95, serving in Van Stabel's division. On 15 May 1795, Captain Louis-Marie Le Gouardun took command. Jean Bart was present at the Battle of Genoa in March 1795, and in Cornwallis's Retreat and the subsequent Battle of Groix in June 1795.

On 9 August 1803, Le Gouardun returned as captain, keeping command until 26 May 1808. In February 1809, she formed part of a French fleet which departed from Brest intending to aid the French colony of Martinique which was under threat from invasion. The fleet sailed for Basque Roads to rendezvous with the Rochefort squadron but upon entering the roadstead they were immediately blockaded by the British. On 26 February 1809, the Jean Bart grounded on a shoal near Île Madame while attempting to enter the anchorage south of Ile d'Aix and was wrecked. In April, the British burnt the remains.

== Replica ==
A full-scale model is under construction in Gravelines, France.
