= HMS Swiftsure (1787) =

Ship of the line of the Royal Navy

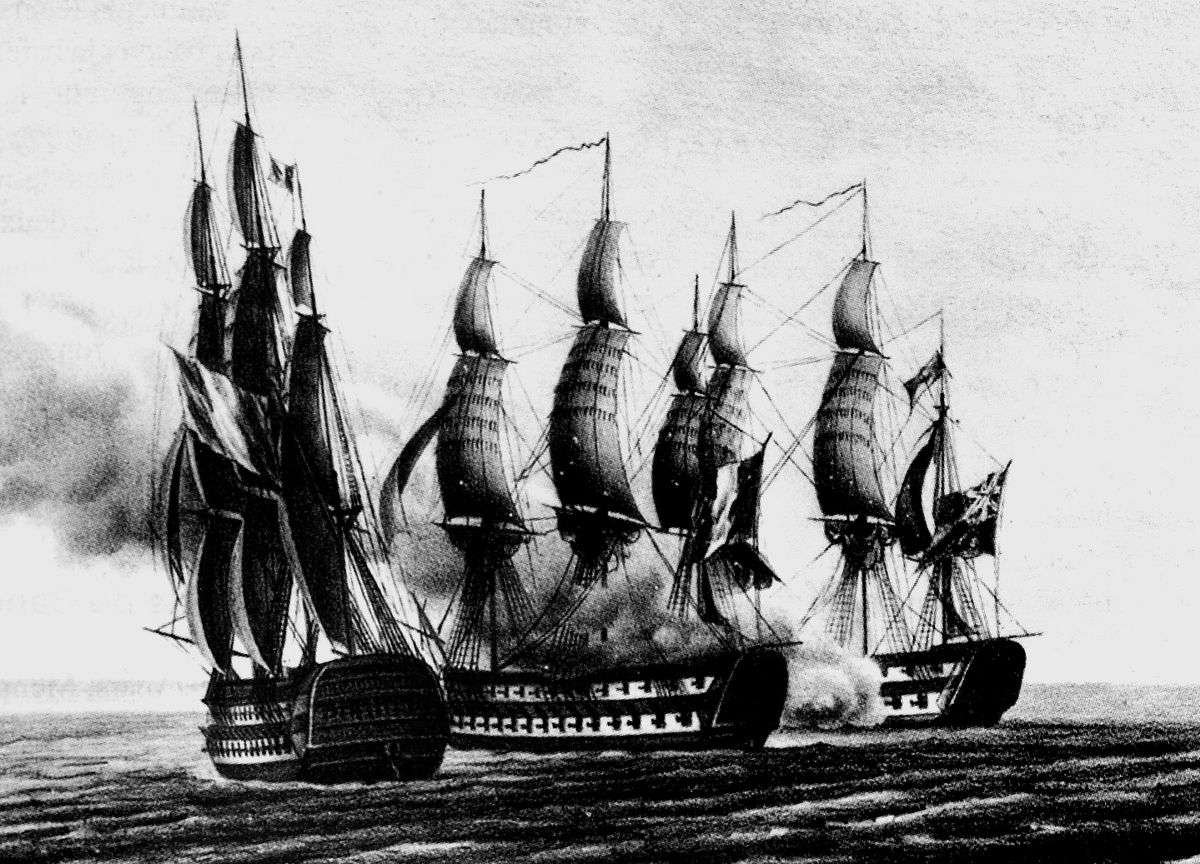
- Indivisible and Dix-Août capture Swiftsure

History

Great Britain
- Name: HMS Swiftsure
- Ordered: 19 June 1782
- Builder: John & William Wells, Deptford
- Laid down: May 1784
- Launched: 4 April 1787
- Honours and awards: Participated in Battle of the Nile; Naval General Service Medal with clasp "Egypt"
- Captured: 24 June 1801, by French Navy

France
- Name: Swiftsure
- Acquired: 24 June 1801
- Honours and awards: Participated in Battle of Trafalgar
- Captured: 21 October 1805, by Royal Navy

United Kingdom
- Name: HMS Irresistible
- Acquired: 21 October 1805
- Fate: Broken up, January 1816

General characteristics
- Class & type: Elizabeth class ship of the line
- Tons burthen: 1612 (bm)
- Length: 168 ft 6 in (51.36 m) (gundeck)
- Beam: 46 ft (14 m)
- Depth of hold: 19 ft 9 in (6.02 m)
- Propulsion: Sails
- Sail plan: Full-rigged ship
- Armament: Gundeck: 28 × 32-pounder guns; Upper gundeck: 28 × 18-pounder guns; QD: 14 × 9-pounder guns; Fc: 4 × 9-pounder guns

HMS Swiftsure was a 74-gun third rate ship of the line of the British Royal Navy. She spent most of her career serving with the British, except for a brief period when she was captured by the French during the Napoleonic Wars in the action of 24 June 1801. She fought in several of the most famous engagements of the French Revolutionary and Napoleonic Wars, fighting for the British at the Battle of the Nile, and the French at the Battle of Trafalgar.

== Construction and commissioning ==
Swiftsure was ordered from the yards of John & William Wells, Deptford on 19 June 1782, as an Elizabeth class ship of the line. She was laid down in May 1784 and launched on 4 April 1787. She was initially commissioned on 22 May 1787 at Deptford, and recommissioned at Woolwich on 21 August 1787. She had cost £31,241.3.5 to build, with a further £10,643 spent on fitting her out. She was coppered at Woolwich for a further £1,635.

== British career ==
She was commissioned for service under her first captain, Sir James Wallace in June 1790. She sailed to Plymouth where in August she underwent another refit, for £6,456, to prepare her for service in the English Channel. After her initial period of service she was paid off in September 1791, and underwent a more significant refit for the sum of £11,413, followed by further work being carried out the next year. She returned to service and was recommissioned under Captain Charles Boyles in July 1793. Swiftsure served as the flagship of Rear-Admiral Sir Robert Kingsmill, and operated on the Irish Station during 1794.

At the action of 7 May 1794 Swiftsure captured the 36-gun French frigate Atalante, after a chase of 39 hours. Atalante was armed with 38 guns and had a crew of 274 men under the command of M. Charles Linois. In the action, Atalante had 10 killed and 32 wounded; British casualties were one man killed by a random shot. Swiftsure then returned to Plymouth to carry out repairs. The Royal Navy took Atalante into service as HMS Espion.

Swiftsure left Britain for Jamaica on 14 May 1795. In December 1795 Swiftsure passed under the command of Captain Robert Parker, under whom she returned to Britain. She was refitted at Portsmouth the following year, before commissioning in October 1796 under Captain Arthur Phillips. He was succeeded in September 1797 by Captain John Irwin, but the following month Captain Benjamin Hallowell took command.

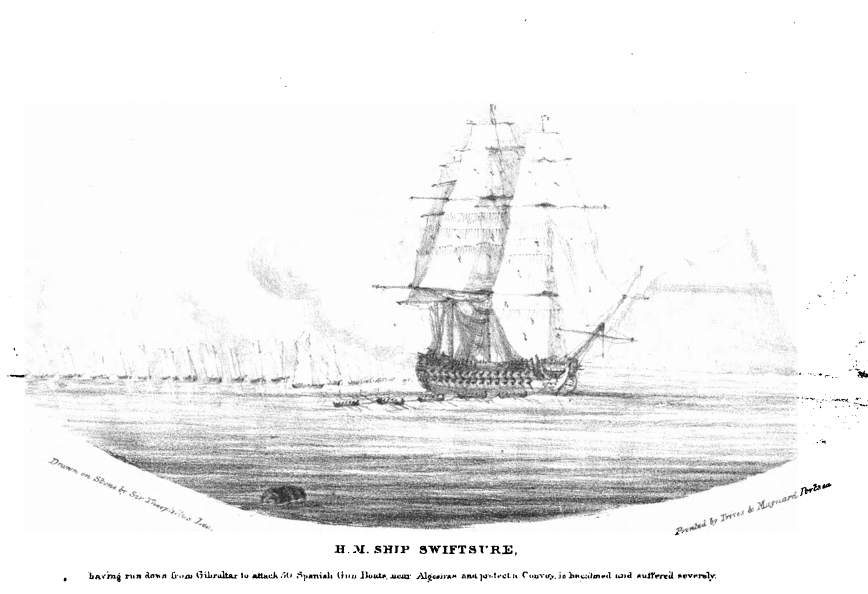
Swiftsure becalmed near Algeciras, as sketched by one of her midshipmen, John Theophilus Lee in 1798

=== Battle of the Nile ===
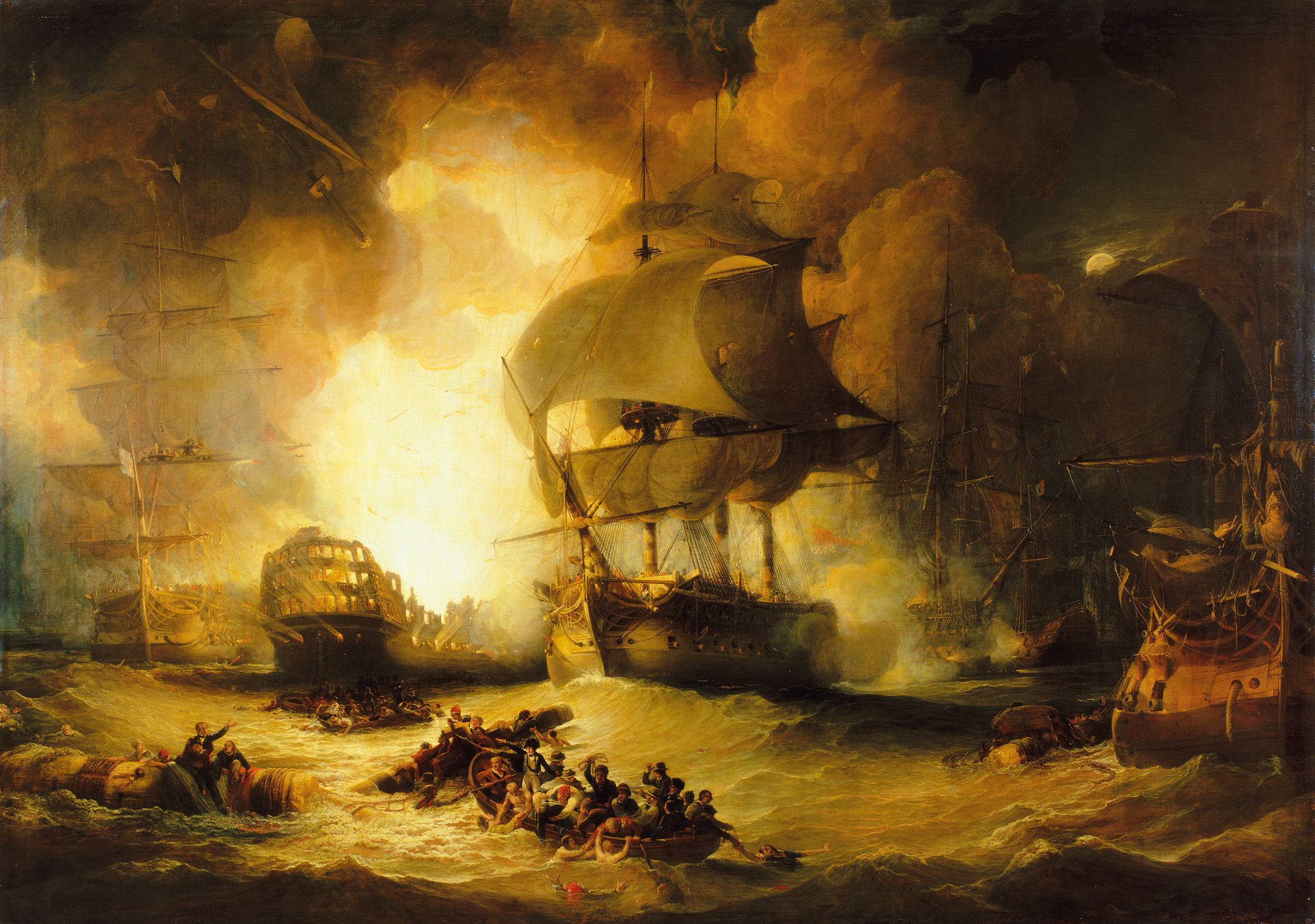
Orient explodes at the Nile. HMS Swiftsure is in the centre of the picture, sails billowing in the blast, and riding the wave caused by the force of the explosion.

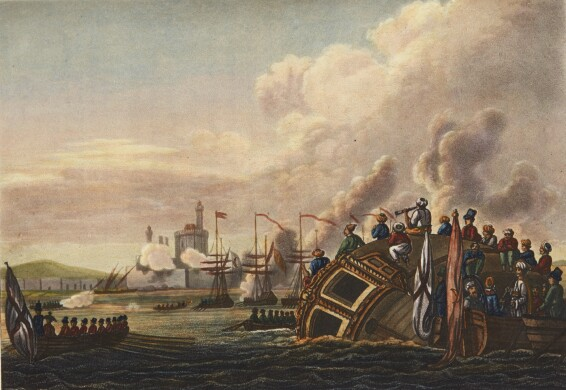
A scene during the Battle of the Nile, by the ships's chaplain Cooper Willyams

Hallowell was still in command of Swiftsure in 1798, when he was ordered to join Horatio Nelson's squadron, watching the French fleet at Toulon. After the French escaped and captured Malta in June, and invaded Egypt in July, Nelson and his fleet pursued them, eventually locating them anchored in Aboukir Bay on 1 August. Swiftsure was not initially with the fleet, having been ordered by Nelson to reconnoitre Alexandria, before the French had been discovered. He arrived on the scene after dark and moved into the bay to attack. The darkness and the smoke made it difficult to tell which ship was British and which was French, so Hallowell decided to hold fire until he had anchored and prepared his ship. As he moved closer, a darkened ship was spotted standing out of the action. Hallowell determined her to be French, but decided to hold to his original plan and passed her by. The ship was in fact HMS Bellerophon, which had gone up against the much larger 110-gun French first rate Orient earlier in the battle, until being dismasted and forced to drift out of the action.

Hallowell took Swiftsure in, eventually anchoring across the stern of Franklin and the bow of Orient, and proceeded to open fire on them. After an hour of exchanging shots, a fire was observed in the cabin of Orient. Hallowell ordered his men to concentrate their fire on this area, while HMS Alexander came along the opposite side and did the same. The French began to abandon ship as the fire spread, and a number were brought aboard the British ships, Swiftsure taking on Orient′s first lieutenant and ten men. Seeing that the fire was now out of control, Swiftsure and the other British ships moved away from the area, but when Orient exploded at 10pm, Swiftsure was still near enough to be struck by debris.

After the destruction of the Orient, Swiftsure, in company with HMS Defence, continued to exchange fire with the Franklin, until she surrendered. Swiftsure then moved on to engage the Tonnant, eventually helping to drive her ashore. Swiftsure had seven killed and 22 wounded during the battle. Hallowell received a Gold Medal for his role in the battle, and Swiftsure′s first lieutenant, Thomas Cowan, was promoted to commander. After the battle Hallowell and Swiftsure took over Aboukir island on 8 August, destroying several enemy guns, and carrying the rest away. Two days later, on 10 August, Swiftsure came across and captured the 16-gun corvette Fortune.

=== Egyptian and Italian coasts ===
Swiftsure initially remained off Egypt as part of Samuel Hood's squadron, before departing on 14 February 1799 to join Nelson, then at Palermo. She then joined Thomas Troubridge's squadron and sailed for Naples on 31 March. They arrived on 2 April, and Hallowell landed at Procida to restore monarchist rule. The squadron then cruised off the Italian coast, and supported land based operations, helping to reduce several fortresses. On 7 August Swiftsure was dispatched to Civitavecchia to carry Hallowell to negotiate the surrender of the French garrison. Before the negotiations were complete the Swiftsure was ordered to Gibraltar, and from there to Lisbon, arriving there on 30 November. She cruised off the area with the British squadron, capturing two merchant vessels on 6 December.

Whilst at sea in February 1800, Swiftsure was caught in a gale and badly damaged, having to return to Gibraltar for repairs. On returning to service with the squadron, an enemy fleet was seen on 7 April, having sailed from Cádiz bound for Lima. Two frigates and a number of merchantmen were subsequently captured. Swiftsure followed up this success on 12 April by capturing a Spanish schooner. She then became Sir Richard Bickerton's flagship during the blockade of Cádiz, before being assigned to the fleet under Lord Keith. Keith's fleet covered the landings at Aboukir on 8 March 1801, where Swiftsure′s naval brigade helped to repulse French counter-attacks. Because several of her men were wounded and others sick, Keith removed 80 of Swiftsure's best men and then sent her to Malta as a convoy escort.

On 8 January 1801 Penelope captured the French bombard St. Roche, which was carrying wine, liqueurs, ironware, Delfth cloth, and various other merchandise, from Marseilles to Alexandria. Swiftsure, Tigre, Minotaur, Northumberland, Florentina, and the schooner Malta, were in sight and shared in the proceeds of the capture.

Swiftsure's service in the Royal Navy's Egyptian campaign (8 March to 2 September 1801), qualified her officers and crew for the clasp "Egypt" to the Naval General Service Medal that the Admiralty authorized in 1850 to all surviving claimants. (Note: A first-class share of the prize money awarded in April 1823 was worth £34 2s 4d; a fifth-class share, that of a seaman, was worth 3s 11½d. The amount was small as the total had to be shared between 79 vessels and the entire army contingent.)

=== Capture ===
On 10 June 1801 Hallowell encountered Pigmy and from her learned that a French squadron under Admiral Ganteaume had put to sea. Hallowell decided to return to reinforce Sir John Warren's squadron, but on 24 June Swiftsure encountered Ganteaume. The faster French squadron, consisting of four ships of the line and a frigate, overtook the already damaged and slow, as well as undermanned, Swiftsure. Indivisible and Dix-Août succeeded in shooting away Swiftsure's yards and masts, crippling her and so forcing Hallowell to surrender. Swiftsure had two men killed, two men mortally wounded, and another six wounded; the French lost 33 killed and wounded.

On his repatriation, Hallowell received the court-martial that was automatic for a Royal Navy captain who had lost his ship, but was honourably acquitted. Meanwhile, the French Navy took Swiftsure into service under her own name.

== French service ==
In November 1802, after General Donatien de Rochambeau replaced the deceased Charles Leclerc as commander-in-chief of all French forces in Saint-Domingue, he started ordering Blacks to be executing by drowning. Rochambeau had the entire garrison of Fort Dauphin, all of whom were Black soldiers, transferred to Swiftsure and thrown overboard by her crew. Rochambeau then ordered all French warships to carry out similar executions. Only Jean-Baptiste Philibert Willaumez refused, stating that "The officers of the French Navy are not executioners. I will not obey!" (Note: Les officiers de la Marine française ne sont pas des bourreaux. Je n'obéirai pas!)

=== Battle of Trafalgar ===
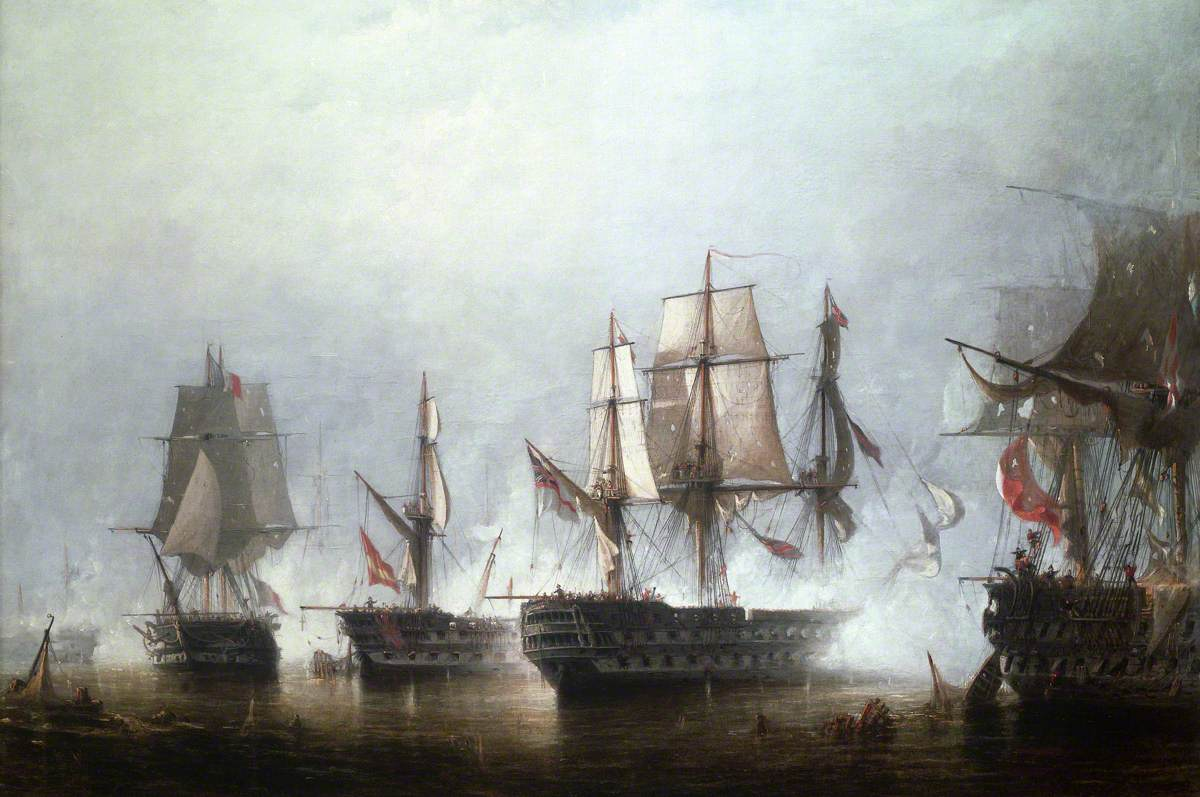
Swiftsure (first from left) at Trafalgar

She only spent four years with the French, before forming part of Vice-Admiral Villeneuve's fleet at Cádiz, under her captain, Charles-Eusebe l'Hôpitalier-Villemadrin. On 21 October 1805 she sailed out with the combined Franco-Spanish fleets to engage in the Battle of Trafalgar. During the battle she formed part of the rear of the line, astern of Aigle and ahead of Argonaute. She was fired upon by HMS Colossus, and after an exchange of fire, lost her main topmast and had her guns silenced. She began to drift away, while Colossus opened fire on Bahama. Swiftsure's crew regained control, and returned to fire on Colossus, but at that moment Edward Codrington's HMS Orion came through the smoke, slipped under Swiftsure′s stern and discharged several devastating broadsides. Swiftsure had her mainmast, taffrail and wheel shot away, and most of the guns on the main gun-deck were dismounted. Villemadrin attempted to fight on, but eventually struck, having suffered 68 dead and 123 wounded during the battle.

After the battle HMS Dreadnought took her in tow. The subsequent storm caused the line to break, and by 23 October she was drifting towards Cádiz. The frigate HMS Phoebe was however able to reattach a tow line and put several of her own carpenters aboard to stop the leaks. The worsening weather again caused her to break free, but the men from Phoebe succeeded in keeping control of Swiftsure, bringing her to anchor on 26 October. HMS Polyphemus took her into tow again and brought her into Gibraltar.

== Return to the Royal Navy ==
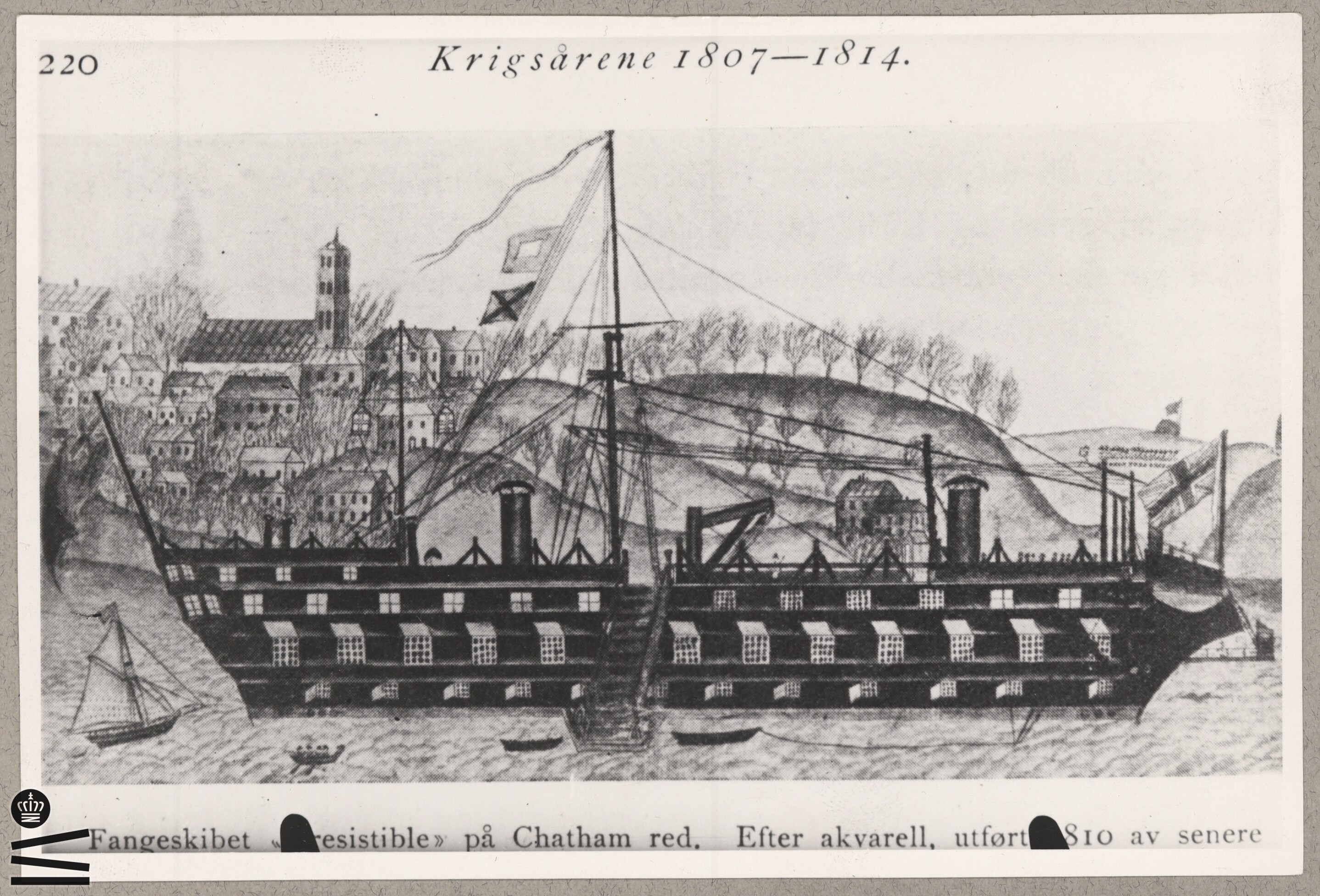
Irresistible stationed as a prison ship at Chatham.

Swiftsure was repaired at Gibraltar and was recommissioned in April 1806 under Captain George Digby. She sailed home, arriving at Chatham on 11 June 1806. By this time, another HMS Swiftsure had already entered service, and had been present at Trafalgar. The recaptured Swiftsure was renamed HMS Irresistible, and was laid up. She was recommissioned in March 1808 under Captain George Fowke, and was used as a prison ship at Chatham. She served in this role until being broken up there in January 1816.
