= French ship Cassard (1795) =

Ship of the line of the French Navy

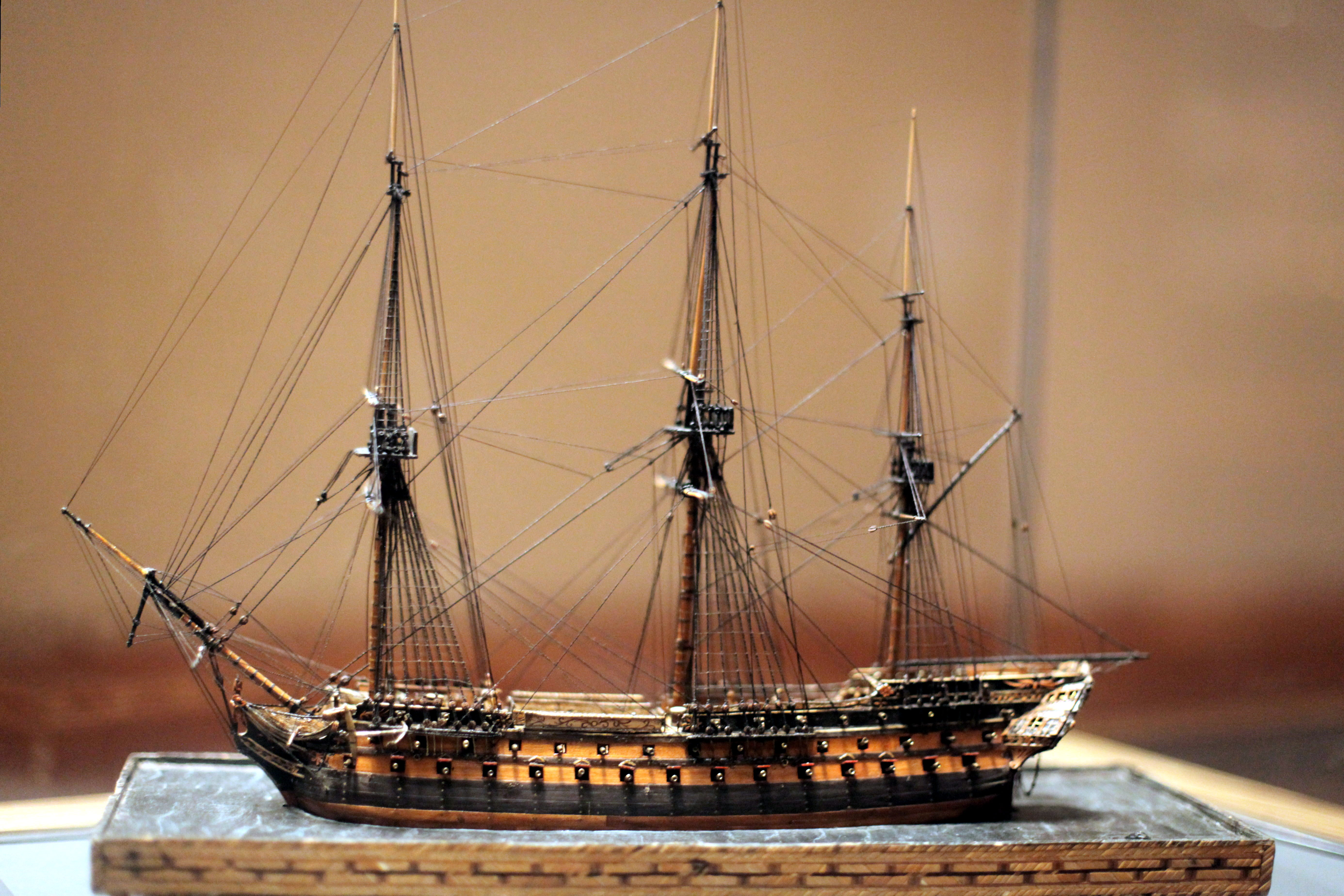
- Ship model of Brave

History

France
- Name: Cassard
- Namesake: Jacques Cassard; 10th of August; Bravery
- Ordered: 16 February 1793
- Builder: Lorient
- Laid down: August 1793
- Launched: 2 May 1795
- Renamed: Cassard in 1795; Dix-août in 1798; Brave in 1803
- Captured: 1806

United Kingdom
- Acquired: 6 February 1806
- Fate: Foundered attempting to reach Britain, April 1806.

General characteristics
- Class & type: Téméraire-class ship of the line
- Displacement: 3,069 tonneaux
- Tons burthen: 1,537 port tonneaux
- Length: 55.87 m (183 ft 4 in)
- Beam: 14.46 m (47 ft 5 in)
- Draught: 7.15 m (23.5 ft)
- Depth of hold: 7.15 m (23 ft 5 in)
- Sail plan: Full-rigged ship
- Crew: 705
- Armament: 74 guns: Lower gun deck: 28 × 36 pdr guns; Upper gun deck: 30 × 18 pdr guns; Forecastle and Quarterdeck: 16 × 8 pdr guns

Cassard was a 74-gun Téméraire-class ship of the line built for the French Navy during the 1790s. Completed in 1795, she played a minor role in the Napoleonic Wars. She was renamed Dix-Août in 1798, in honour of the insurrection of 10 August 1792, and subsequently Brave in 1803.

== Description ==
The Téméraire-class ships had a length of 55.87 metres (183 ft 4 in), a beam of 14.46 metres (47 ft 5 in) and a depth of hold of 7.15 metres (23 ft 5 in). The ships displaced 3,069 tonneaux and had a mean draught of 7.15 metres (23 ft 5 in). They had a tonnage of 1,537 port tonneaux. Their crew numbered 705 officers and ratings during wartime. They were fitted with three masts and ship rigged.

The muzzle-loading, smoothbore armament of the Téméraire class consisted of twenty-eight 36-pounder long guns on the lower gun deck and thirty 18-pounder long guns on the upper gun deck. On the quarterdeck and forecastle were a total of sixteen 8-pounder long guns. Beginning with the ships completed after 1787, the armament of the Téméraires began to change with the addition of four 36-pounder obusiers on the poop deck (dunette). Some ships had instead twenty 8-pounders.

== Construction and career ==
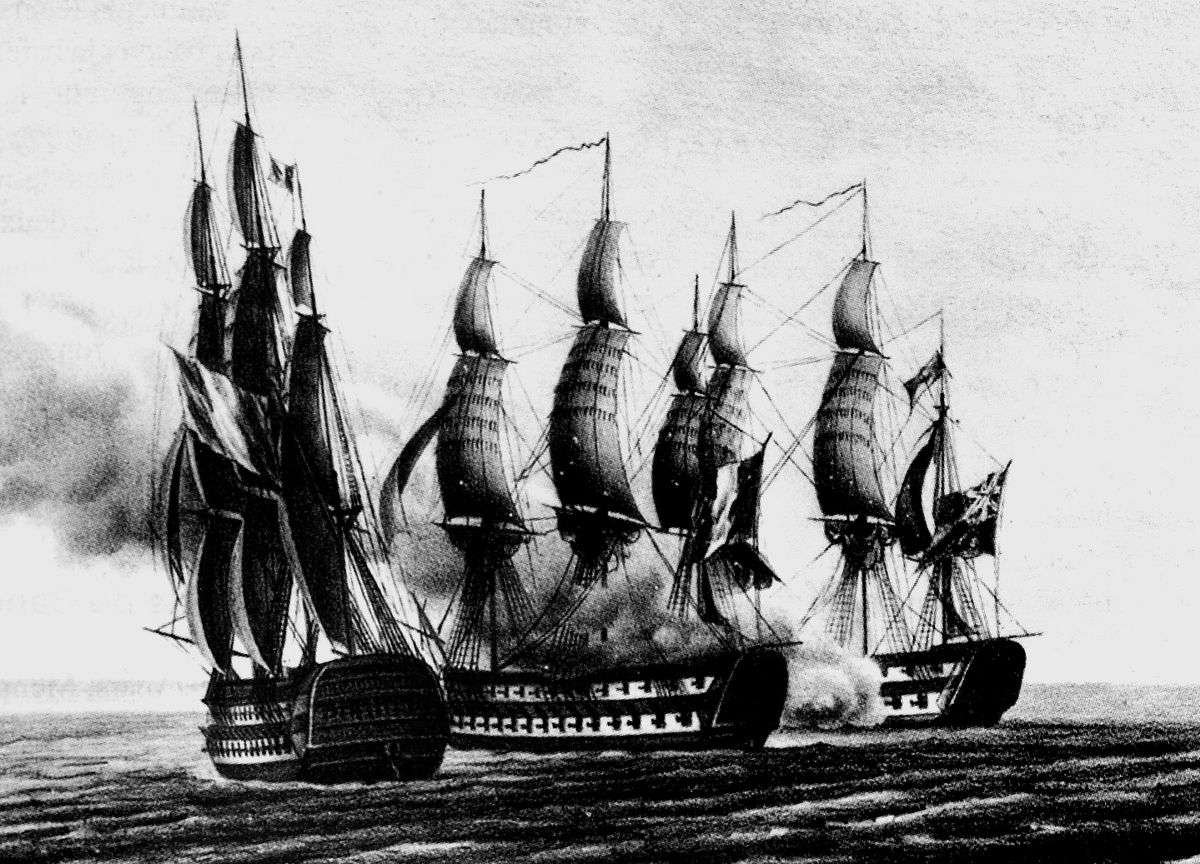
Capture of HMS Swiftsure by Indivisible and Dix-Août, 26 September 1805

Cassard was ordered on 16 February 1793 and laid down at the Arsenal de Lorient in August. The ship was launched on 2 May 1795 and completed in July. She was renamed Dix-Août on 24 February 1798. Later that year, the ship participated in the French expedition to Ireland. On 10 February 1801 Dix-août captured the 16-gun cutter HMS Sprightly, which she scuttled. On 27 March 1801, as Dix-août sailed with the Mediterranean Fleet, she collided with Formidable and had to return to harbour. On 4 February 1803, her name was changed to Brave.

On 26 September 1805, Indivisible and Dix-Août succeeded in shooting away Swiftsure's yards and masts, crippling her and so capturing her. Swiftsure had two men killed, two men mortally wounded, and another six wounded; the French lost 33 killed and wounded. She was captured by HMS Donegal on 6 February 1806 at the Battle of San Domingo. She foundered shortly thereafter on 12 April 1806 without loss of life while en route to Britain.
