= French ship Indivisible =

Ship of the line of the French Navy

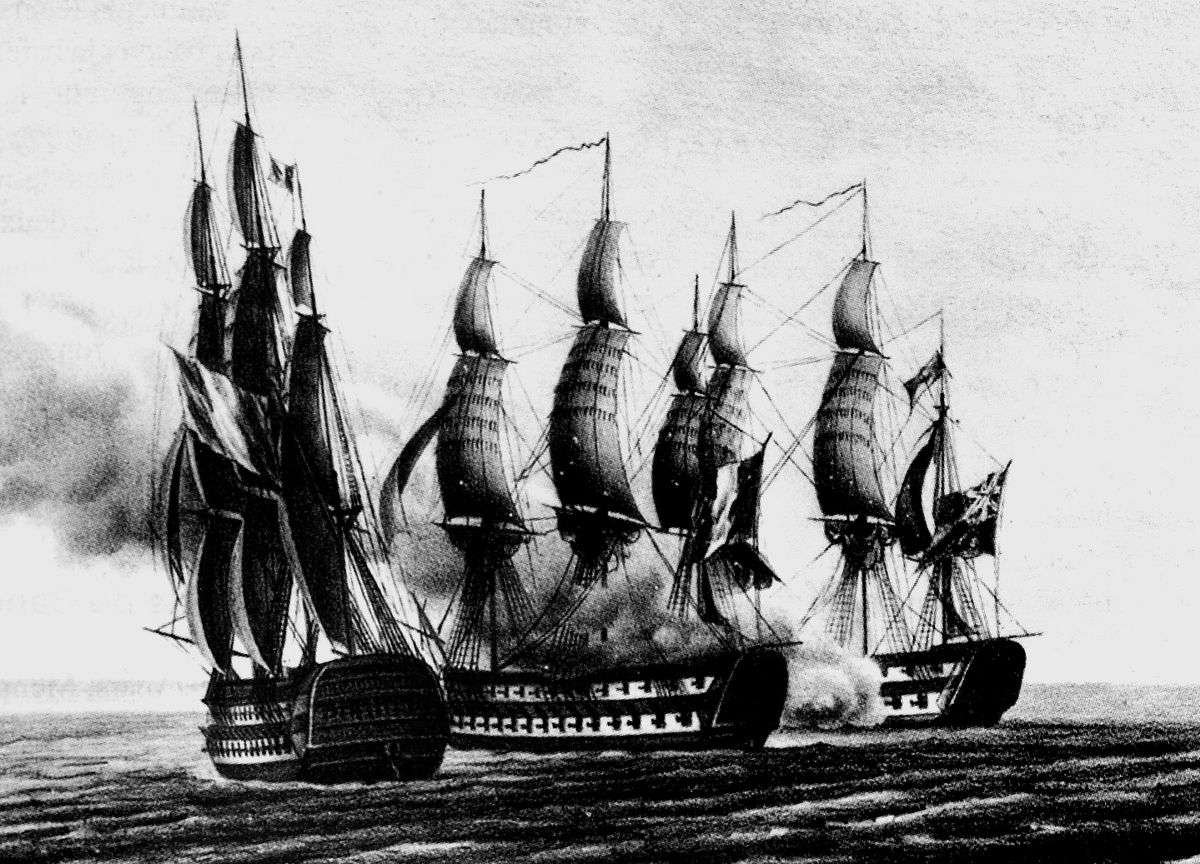
- Capture of HMS Swiftsure by Indivisible and Dix-Août

History

France
- Name: Indivisible
- Builder: Brest
- Laid down: May 1793
- Launched: 8 July 1799
- Completed: October 1799
- Renamed: Alexandre on 5 February 1803
- Captured: On 6 February 1806 by the Royal Navy

United Kingdom
- Name: Alexandre
- Acquired: Captured on 6 February 1806
- Reclassified: Powder hulk in 1808
- Fate: Sold for breaking up on 16 May 1822

General characteristics
- Class & type: 80-gun Tonnant-class ship of the line
- Displacement: 3,868 tonneaux
- Tons burthen: 2,034 port tonneaux; 2,231 49/94 bm
- Length: 195 ft 2 in (59.49 m) (gundeck); 158 ft 8 in (48.36 m) (keel)
- Beam: 51 ft 4.5 in (15.659 m)
- Depth of hold: 23 ft 2 in (7.06 m)
- Sail plan: Full-rigged ship
- Complement: 590
- Armament: French service: 30 × 36-pounder long guns; 32 × 24-pounder long guns; 18 × 12-pounder long guns; 4 × obusiers de vaisseau; British service: Lower deck: 28 × 32-pounder guns; Upper deck: 28 × 18-pounder guns; Quarterdeck: 4 × 12-pounder guns + 10 × 32-pounder carronades; Forecastle: 2 × 12-pounder gun + 10 × 32-pounder carronades; Roundhouse: 6 × 18-pounder carronades

Indivisible was a Tonnant-class 80-gun ship of the line of the French Navy.

== Career ==
Originally named the Indivisible in 1793, she was commissioned in Toulon on 23 September 1800. On 18 March 1800, Captain Louis-Marie Le Gouardun took command, which he retained until 9 March 1801.

On 5 February 1803, she was renamed Alexandre, and recommissioned in Brest under Captain Leveyer.

In December, under Captain Garreau, she was part of Corentin Urbain Leissègues's squadron bound for San Domingo. She took part in the subsequent Battle of San Domingo, where she was badly damaged by the fire of HMS Superb, which left her adrift, her rigging shot off and her rudder destroyed. She was taken by HMS Spencer.

From 1808, the Royal Navy used her as a gunpowder hulk in Plymouth. Indivisible was eventually broken up in 1822.
