= HMS Hussar (1799) =

Royal Navy fifth-rate frigate

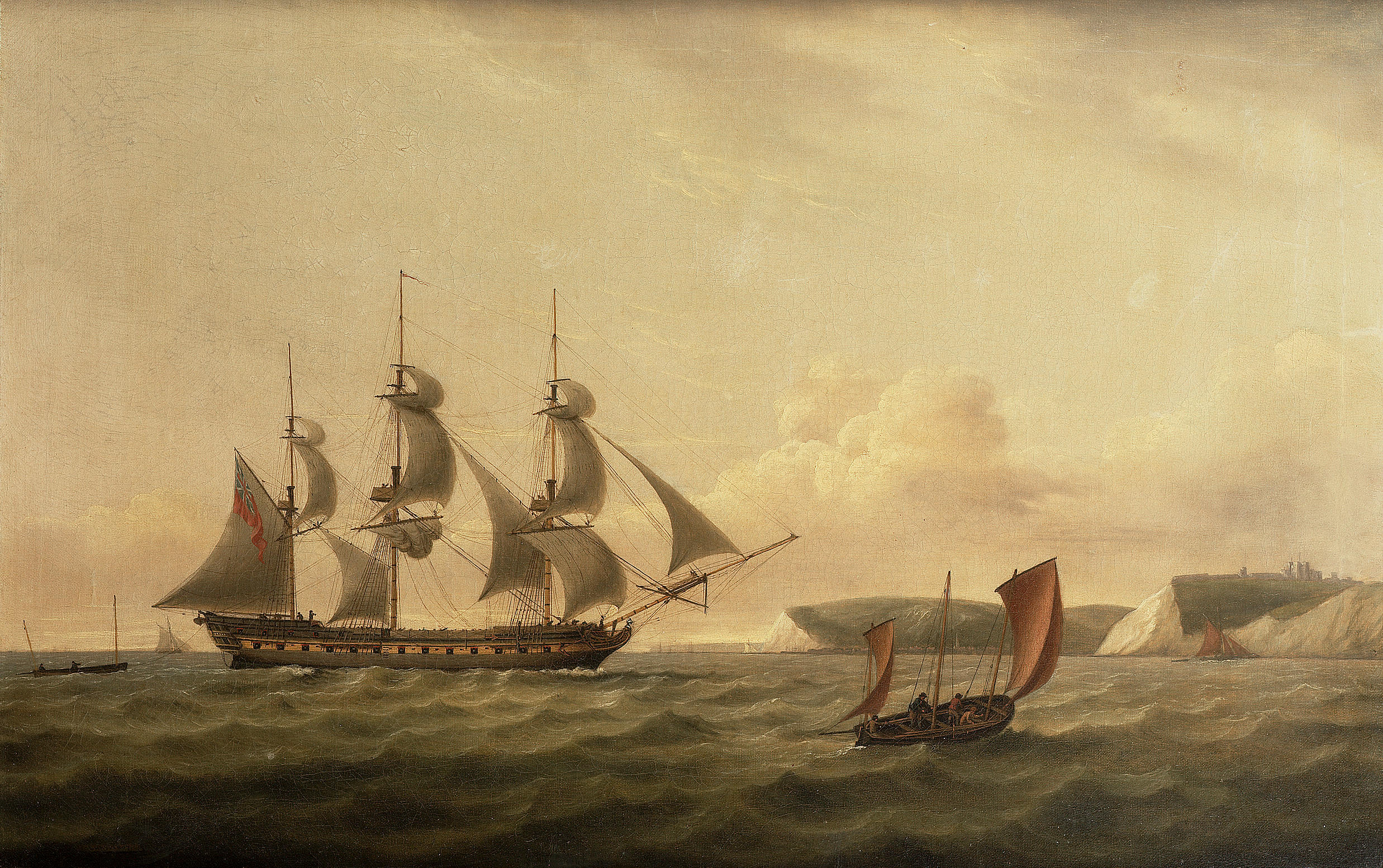
- Painting of Hussar's sister ship HMS Amazon

History

Great Britain
- Name: HMS Hussar
- Ordered: 15 February 1797
- Builder: Woolwich Dockyard
- Cost: £29,884
- Laid down: August 1798
- Launched: 1 June 1799
- Completed: 11 November 1799
- Commissioned: November 1799
- Fate: Wrecked 8 February 1804

General characteristics
- Class & type: Fifth-rate Amazon-class frigate
- Tons burthen: 1,04288/94 (bm)
- Length: 150 ft 3 in (45.8 m) (upper deck); 125 ft 8 in (38.3 m) (keel)
- Beam: 39 ft 6 in (12 m)
- Draught: 18 ft 1 in (5.5 m) (forward); 19 ft 8 in (6 m) (aft)
- Depth of hold: 13 ft (4 m)
- Propulsion: Sails
- Complement: 284 (later 300)
- Armament: UD: 28 × 18-pounder guns; QD: 2 × 9-pounder guns + 12 × 32-pounder carronades; Fc: 2 × 9-pounder guns + 2 × 32-pounder carronades

HMS Hussar was a 38-gun fifth-rate Amazon-class frigate of the Royal Navy. Launched at the end of 1799, the entirety of the frigate's career was spent serving in the English Channel and off the coast of Spain. Hussar primarily served as a convoy escort and cruiser, in which occupation the frigate took several prizes, including the French privateer Le General Bessieres. Towards the end of 1803 Hussar was sent to serve in Sir Edward Pellew's Ferrol squadron. On 8 February 1804 Hussar was returning to England with dispatches when the ship was wrecked off the coast of Île de Sein. The crew attempted to sail for home in a fleet of commandeered boats, but the majority were forced to go into Brest to avoid sinking in bad weather, where they were made prisoners of war.

== Design and construction ==
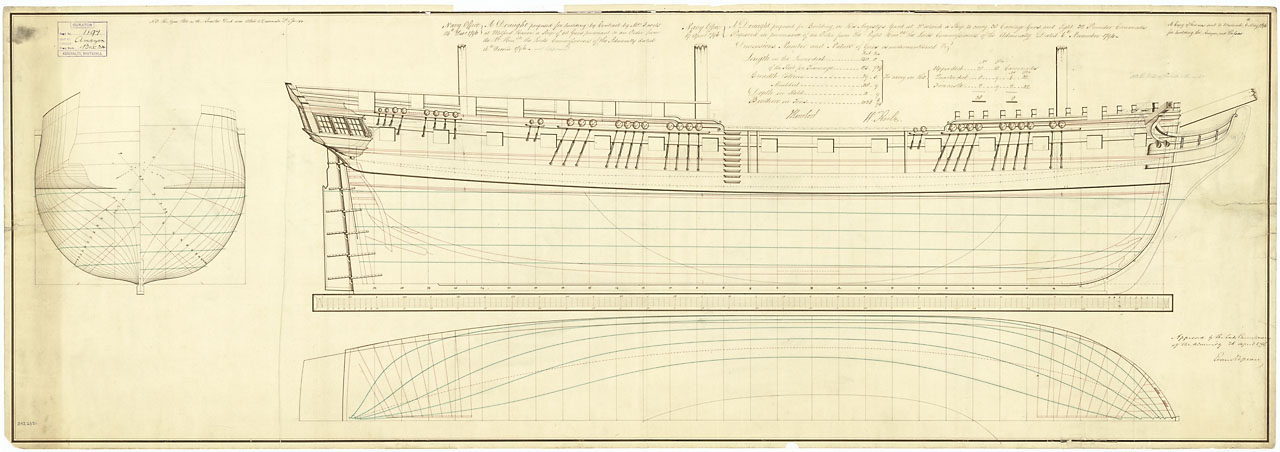
The lines of Hussar

Hussar was a 38-gun, 18-pounder, fifth-rate Amazon-class frigate. The ship was one of two built to the design, along with the namesake of the class HMS Amazon. The ships were drawn up by the Surveyor of the Navy Sir William Rule, who submitted the design on 19 April 1796. They were an enlarged version of a previous design by Rule, the 38-gun HMS Naiad. Naiad was in turn an expanded version of another, older, Rule ship class, this being the Amazon class designed in 1794.

Hussar was ordered on 15 February 1797 to be built at Woolwich Dockyard by shipwright John Tovery. The ship was originally planned to be named Hyaena, but this was changed on 24 January 1798. Hussar was laid down in August of the latter year, and launched on 1 June 1799 with the following dimensions: 150 feet 3 inches (45.8 m) along the upper deck, 125 feet 8 inches (38.3 m) at the keel, with a beam of 39 feet 6 inches (12 m) and a depth in the hold of 13 feet (4 m). The ship had a draught of 18 feet 1 inch (5.5 m) forward and 19 feet 8 inches (6 m) aft, and measured 1,04288/94 tons burthen. The fitting out process was completed in the River Thames on 11 November, with the final cost of construction totalling £29,884.

Hussar's class was described in sailing reports as "fast and very weatherly", as well as being highly manoeuvrable. They were capable of reaching up to 13 knots (24.1 km/h) and showed superior sailing qualities to most other vessels, especially when in a "stiff breeze". The ships were, however, known for "deep and uneasy rolling and pitching", which naval historian Robert Gardiner suggests was because they were built very stiffly. (Note: Sailing reports based on HMS Amazon 31 December 1811 and 15 February 1812.)

The frigate had a crew complement of 284, which would later be raised to 300, and held twenty-eight 18-pounder guns on the upper deck. Rule had originally planned for the quarterdeck to hold eight 9-pounder guns and the forecastle to hold a further two, but on 6 May 1797 six 32-pounder carronades were added to the quarterdeck armament and two more to the forecastle. Hussar's armament was changed again on 17 June 1799, with all but two 9-pounders on each of the quarterdeck and forecastle replaced by more carronades. (Note: This final change in carronades came about because of an Admiralty Order of 31 May 1799 that ordered all new frigates fitting out to be provided with a higher quantity, depending on their size. 9-pounders were only kept in portholes that were partially obscured by rigging.) This resulted in a final armament of twelve 32-pounder carronades and two 9-pounder guns on the quarterdeck, and two 32-pounder carronades and two 9-pounder guns on the forecastle, in addition to Hussar's main 18-pounder guns.

== Service ==
Hussar was commissioned by Captain Lord Garlies in November 1799, for service in the English Channel and off the coast of Ireland as part of the Cork Station. Hussar was in company with the 38-gun frigate HMS Loire and 16-gun schooner HMS Milbrook on 17 May 1800 when the three ships recaptured the British merchant ship Princess Charlotte and captured the French schooner La Francoise. Hussar subsequently sailed to Madeira, returning from there on 9 July. The frigate continued to serve off Ireland, escorting a convoy of ships from west India in to England on 31 October. On 9 November a large gale hit the south coast of England, and many ships in the area were driven out to sea by it and badly damaged. Among these casualties was Hussar, which lost all topmasts and the mizzenmast in the gale, and received considerable hull damage, including the loss of the rudder. Hussar was brought into Portsmouth with a hoy rigged behind as a temporary rudder. (Note: A watercolour painting of Hussar going into Portsmouth after the gale exists in the collection of the National Maritime Museum.) The ship was docked for repairs, which were completed on 28 November.

Having returned to sea, Hussar continued operating with convoys, escorting the East India Company ships Carnatic, Henry Addington, Nottingham, and Ocean on the first leg of their journey to Calcutta on 8 January 1801. Then on 2 March the frigate captured the French 4-gun privateer Le General Bessieres in the Atlantic Ocean. The French warship had been attempting to sail from Bordeaux to Santo Domingo. Hussar then recaptured the British merchant ship James on 12 April. Later on in the same month Garlies was replaced in command of Hussar by Captain John Giffard, but he in turn gave command over to Captain William Brown soon afterwards. Brown also served in Hussar only briefly, with Captain John Ommanney soon taking over from him on a temporary basis, with the frigate continuing to serve in the English Channel. On 22 May the 54-gun fourth-rate HMS Madras attempted to enter Portsmouth, but grounded on Bembridge Ledge. Hussar joined with the 24-gun post ship HMS Eurydice and together they pulled Madras off without damaging the ship.

Hussar received a refit at Plymouth Dockyard between May and November 1802, and was recommissioned in June by Captain Philip Wilkinson, who had joined the ship in May. (Note: Wilkinson changed his surname to Stephens in 1820.) The frigate was sent to serve in the North Sea and English Channel. On 10 January 1803 the frigate's gunnery storeroom caught fire while anchored near Sheerness. The fire was close to the ship's magazine and while it did not reach it, some other combustible matter did explode. In reaction to this Hussar's crew ran onto the quarterdeck, from where one small boat was hanging off the rear of the ship. Too many people attempted to board the boat to escape the explosion, causing the davit to break and all in the boat to be thrown into the water. Two master's mates, a midshipman, fourteen seamen, and a woman were drowned. No more explosions on Hussar occurred and Wilkinson was able to stop the fire from spreading or from doing serious damage to the frigate.

When the Napoleonic Wars began in May 1803, Hussar was based at Spithead, and was quickly sent out into the Bay of Biscay. On 23 June Hussar was sailing in sight of the British privateer Trimmer when the latter captured the French brig La Flore, for which Hussar shared in the prize money of. The frigate then underwent a refit at Plymouth, in which new masts and rigging were put in place, that was completed on 29 October. The ship briefly returned on 17 November to repair damage received in a large storm while cruising. Hussar continued on station after this, and in the winter was sent to join a squadron serving off the coast of Spain at Ferrol.

On 6 February 1804 Hussar was ordered to sail back to England from Ares Bay carrying the dispatches of Captain Sir Edward Pellew, the commander of the squadron. While doing so the frigate was also to make contact with the Channel Fleet which was stationed off Cape Finisterre. In the course of this errand Hussar was wrecked off the coast of Île de Sein in the late evening of 8 February. The crew were not harmed and they landed on the island, taking it over from the fishermen who lived there. In the morning of 10 February Wilkinson sent a party out to burn Hussar, the wreck of which was still intact. Upon the completion of this task Wilkinson set sail in his barge, with the rest of the crew in thirteen commandeered fishing boats, intending to sail for England. The fishing boats, however, were found to be in very poor condition and they were all forced to sail into Brest to avoid being lost at sea as the weather worsened. There they surrendered themselves to the French fleet present in port.

Wilkinson's barge, which had been leading the fishing boats before being lost in the rain, was not affected by these problems, and he reached the 36-gun frigate HMS Sirius which took him in, arriving at Portsmouth on 28 February. The rest of Hussar's crew were incarcerated as prisoners of war for ten years. Two members of the crew, Midshipman Henry Ashworth and Master's Mate Donat Henchy O'Brien, succeeded in escaping from the prison of Bitche Citadel in November 1808 by stealing a boat and making their way to Trieste, from where they and another naval officer were picked up by a raiding party from the 32-gun frigate HMS Amphion.

== Prizes ==
Vessels captured or destroyed for which Hussar's crew received full or partial credit
Date	Ship	Nationality	Type	Fate	Ref.
17 May 1800	Princess Charlotte	British	Merchant ship	Recaptured	
17 May 1800	La Francoise	French	Schooner	Captured	
2 March 1801	Le General Bessieres	French	4-gun privateer	Captured	
12 April 1801	James	British	Merchant ship	Recaptured	
23 June 1803	La Flore	French	Merchant brig	Captured	
