= John Quilliam =

Royal Navy officer (1771–1829)

Captain John Quilliam
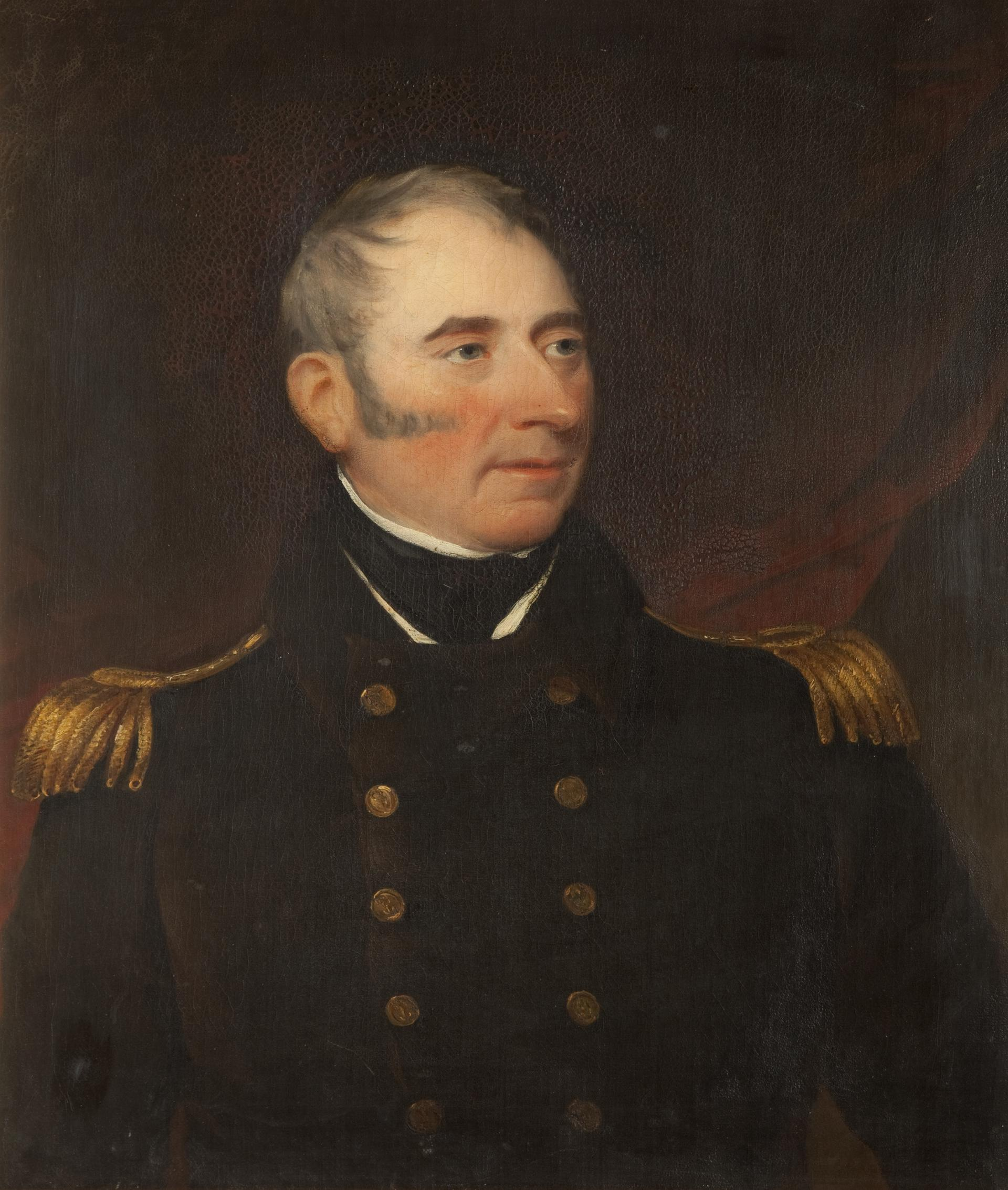
- An 1826 portrait of Captain John Quilliam by the artist Henry Barber
- Born: 29 September 1771; Marown, Isle of Man
- Died: 10 October 1829 (aged 58); Michael, Isle of Man
- Spouse: Margaret Stevenson
- Military career
- Allegiance: United Kingdom
- Branch: Royal Navy
- Service years: 1794–1817
- Rank: Captain
- Commands: HMS Ildefonso; HMS Spencer; HMS Inconstant; HMS Crescent; HMS Alexandria
- Conflicts: French Revolutionary Wars; Battle of Camperdown; Battle of Copenhagen; Napoleonic Wars; Battle of Trafalgar; War of 1812

Captain John Quilliam (29 September 1771 – 10 October 1829) was a Royal Navy officer who served as first lieutenant on HMS Victory at the Battle of Trafalgar. He was a farmer's son who was impressed into the Royal Navy in 1791.

== Biography ==
=== Early life ===
The eldest son of John Quilliam and Christian Clucas of Ballakelly, John Quilliam was born in Marown, Isle of Man, in 1771. It is said he did not care for farming and consequently he was apprenticed to a stonemason. His early nautical career is unknown. However, he was impressed into the Royal Navy from a collier in Castletown harbour.

=== Career ===
Unlike most impressed sailors, Quilliam rose rapidly in the Royal Navy. By 1797 he had risen to the rank of midshipman and is recorded at the Battle of Camperdown following which he was again promoted, this time to the rank of lieutenant, on the recommendation of Admiral Duncan subsequently serving as third lieutenant on the frigate HMS Ethalion, under the command of Captain James Young.

On 7 October 1799 Ethalion captured the 36-gun Spanish treasure ship Thetis. For his part in the capture, Quilliam received over £5000.

==== Battle of Copenhagen ====
At the Battle of Copenhagen in 1801, Quilliam was first lieutenant aboard the frigate HMS Amazon. The slight draft of the Amazon meant she was able to get close under the shore batteries; however this in turn led to the Amazon receiving a high volume of damage, the result of which was that all the higher-ranking officers were killed, leaving Quilliam in command. Quilliam's gallantry and calmness under fire following the death of Captain Edward Riou and all the senior officers of the Amazon, quickly came to the attention of Lord Nelson. In 1803, when HMS Victory was commissioned as his flagship, Nelson appointed Quilliam first lieutenant. Subsequently, Quilliam became an accomplished officer.

==== Battle of Trafalgar ====
Quilliam was the senior lieutenant on the Victory being responsible for safety, part of this remit seeing him develop an emergency system in order to steer the ship. He assisted in steering Victory into action at Trafalgar, his system coming into effect early in the battle, when having sustained damage to her steering gear Victory required all Quilliam's experience in order for her to continue to remain seaworthy.

A contemporary report stated:

"Just as she (the Victory) had got about 500 yards of the larboard beam of the Bucentaure the Victory's mizzen-topmast was shot away, about two-thirds up. A shot also struck and knocked to pieces the wheel; and the ship was obliged to be steered from the gun room, the First Lieutenant John Quilliam and master Thomas Atkinson, relieving each other at the duty."

— James's Naval History of Great Britain

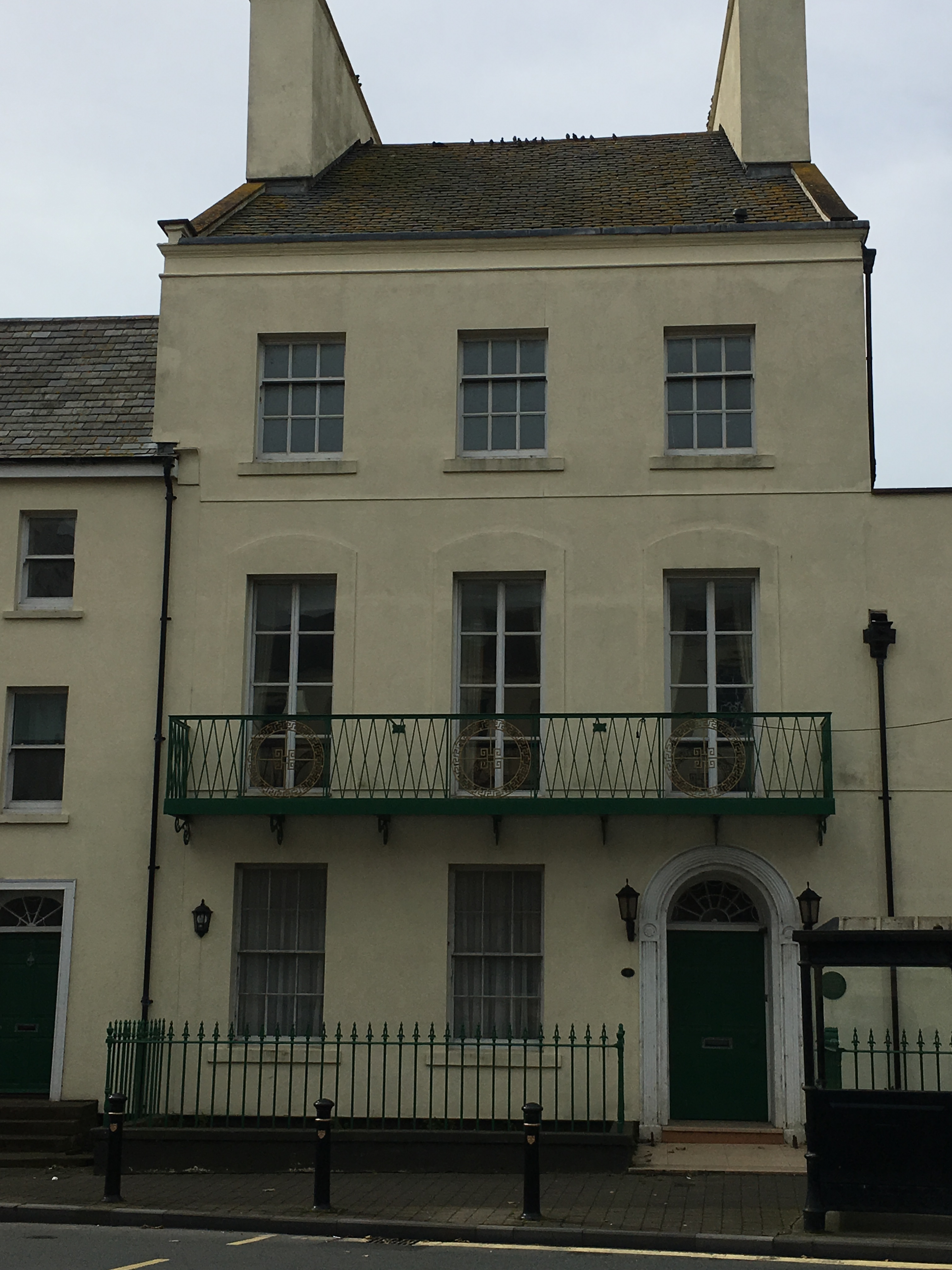
The former home of Captain John Quilliam, Castletown, Isle of Man

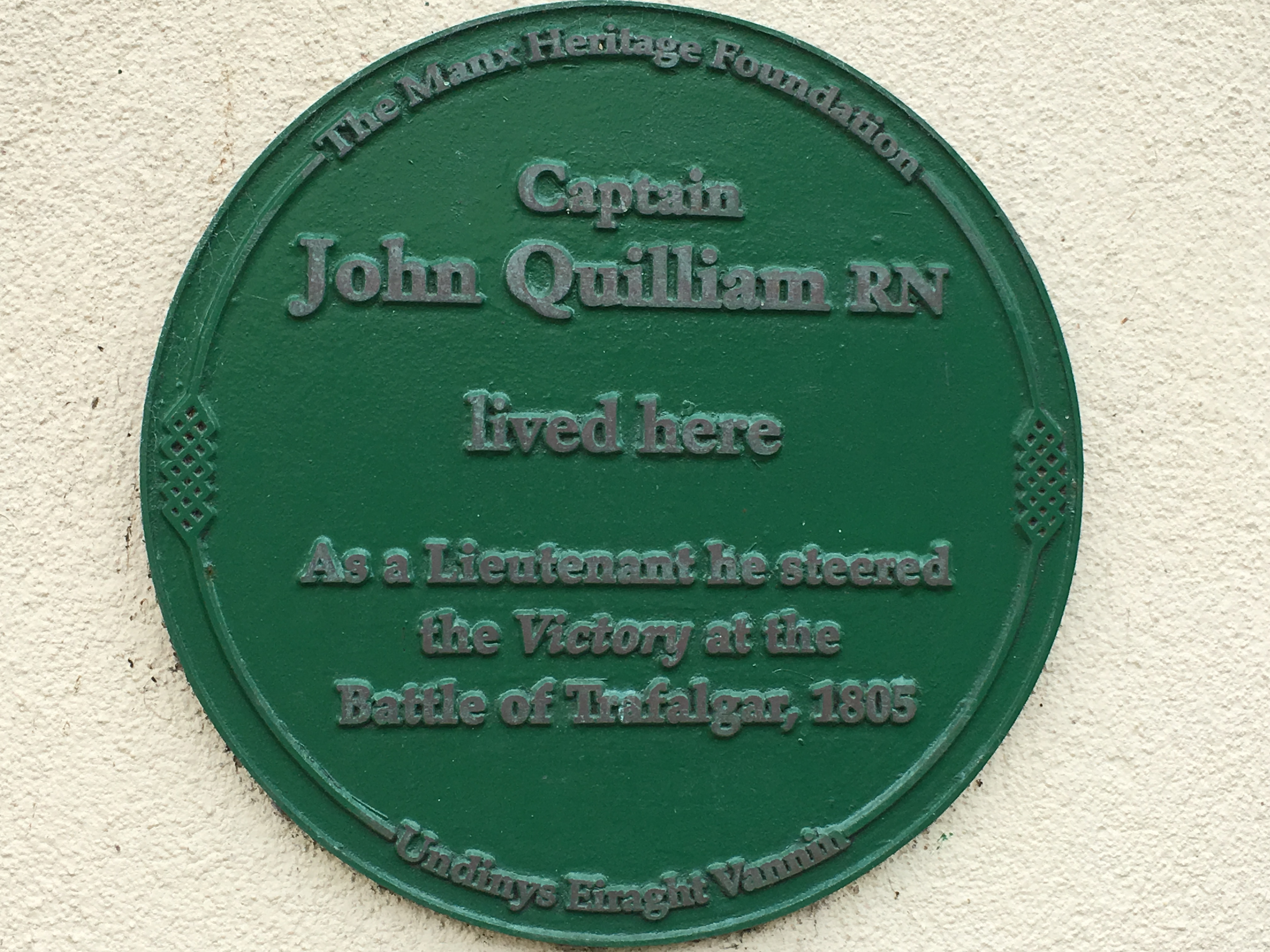
Heritage plaque on the former home of Capt. Quilliam

==== Post Trafalgar ====
Following Trafalgar Quilliam was promoted to captain and placed in command of HMS Ildefonso, a Spanish 74 having to refit her at Gibraltar and not arriving in England until 16 May 1806. In 1808, he was captain of Admiral Stopford's flagship HMS Spencer, subsequently taking command of the frigates HMS Alexandria, HMS Inconstant and HMS Crescent, seeing action on the Newfoundland Station where he served as such until the defeat of Napoleon in 1815 when he retired from the navy.

On 18 September 1813, off Cape Row as captain of the Crescent, Quilliam captured the 14-gun American privateer schooner the Elbridge Gerry together with her crew of 66 men.

=== Personal life ===
==== Politics ====
Although still an active naval officer, in 1807 Capt. Quilliam was invited to become a Member of the House of Keys. At that time the body was self-elected, the members being chosen by the lieutenant governor on the recommendation of the house. He resigned his seat in 1810 in order to return to sea, however on his return to the Island he was again invited to continue as a Member of the House of Keys in 1817.

=== Retirement ===
On the conclusion of his career in the navy, Captain Quilliam returned to the Isle of Man, investing his considerable wealth in numerous properties. On 21 December 1807, Quilliam married Margaret Stevenson at Castletown, his wife being part of a renowned Manx family from Balladoole. The couple made their family home at Ballakeighan before they acquired a property on the Parade, Castletown, living in the house known as the "Balcony House." The marriage produced no children.

Quilliam's main hobby was fishing, and he occupied himself with a small fishing boat which he designed and fitted out himself.

In 1826 Capt. Quilliam was instrumental along with Sir William Hillary in the formation on the Isle of Man of a District Association of the Royal National Institution of the Preservation of Life from Shipwreck. He also served as Chairman of the Committee for Shipwrecked Seamen. In addition he was one of a group of gentlemen who put forward the scheme for the erection of the Derbyhaven Breakwater.

=== Death ===
Capt. Qulliam died on 10 October 1829. He was buried in the Stevenson family vault in the graveyard at Kirk Arbory.

== Memorial ==
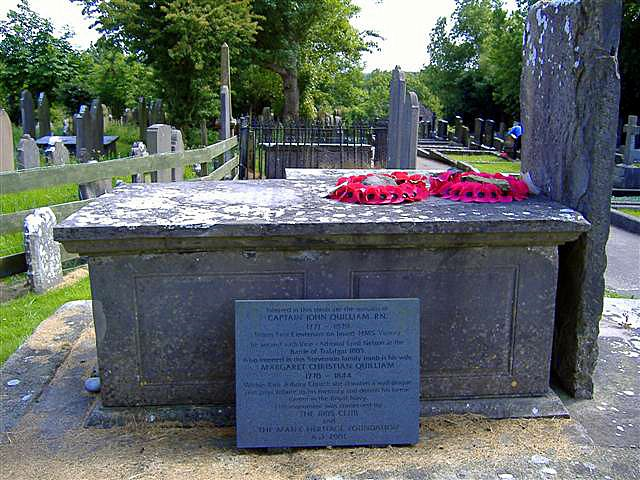
Tomb of Captain John Quilliam R.N., Arbory, Isle of Man

There is the following inscription on his tombstone;

"Sacred to the memory of John Quilliam, Esq., Captain in the Royal Navy. In his early service he was appointed by Adml. Lord Duncan to act as lieutenant at the Battle of Camperdown; after the victory was achieved, this appointment was confirmed. His gallantry and professional skill at the Battle of Copenhagen attracted the notice of Lord Nelson, who subsequently sought for his services on board his own ship, and as his lordship's first lieut. he steered the Victory into action at the Battle of Trafalgar. By the example of Duncan and Nelson he learned to conquer. By his own merit he rose to command: above all this he was an honest man, the noblest work of God. After many years of honourable and distinguished professional service, he retired to this land of his affectionate solicitude and birth, where in his public station as a member of the House of Keys, and in private life, he was in arduous times the uncompromising defender of the rights and privileges of his countrymen, and the zealous and able supporter of every measure tending to promote the welfare and the best interests of his country. He departed this life on 10 October 1829 in the 59th year of his age. This monument is erected by Margaret C. Quilliam to the memory of her beloved husband."

== HMS Quilliam ==
HMS Quilliam was a Q-class destroyer serving in the Royal Navy from 1942 to 1945. She was then transferred to the Royal Netherlands Navy, where she was commissioned as Hr.Ms. Banckert (D801) until 1957. During her wartime service Quilliam was involved in operations in both the Atlantic and Pacific Oceans. While taking part in Operation Iceberg (the Invasion of Okinawa), Quilliam was involved in a collision with the British aircraft carrier Indomitable.

== Commemoration ==
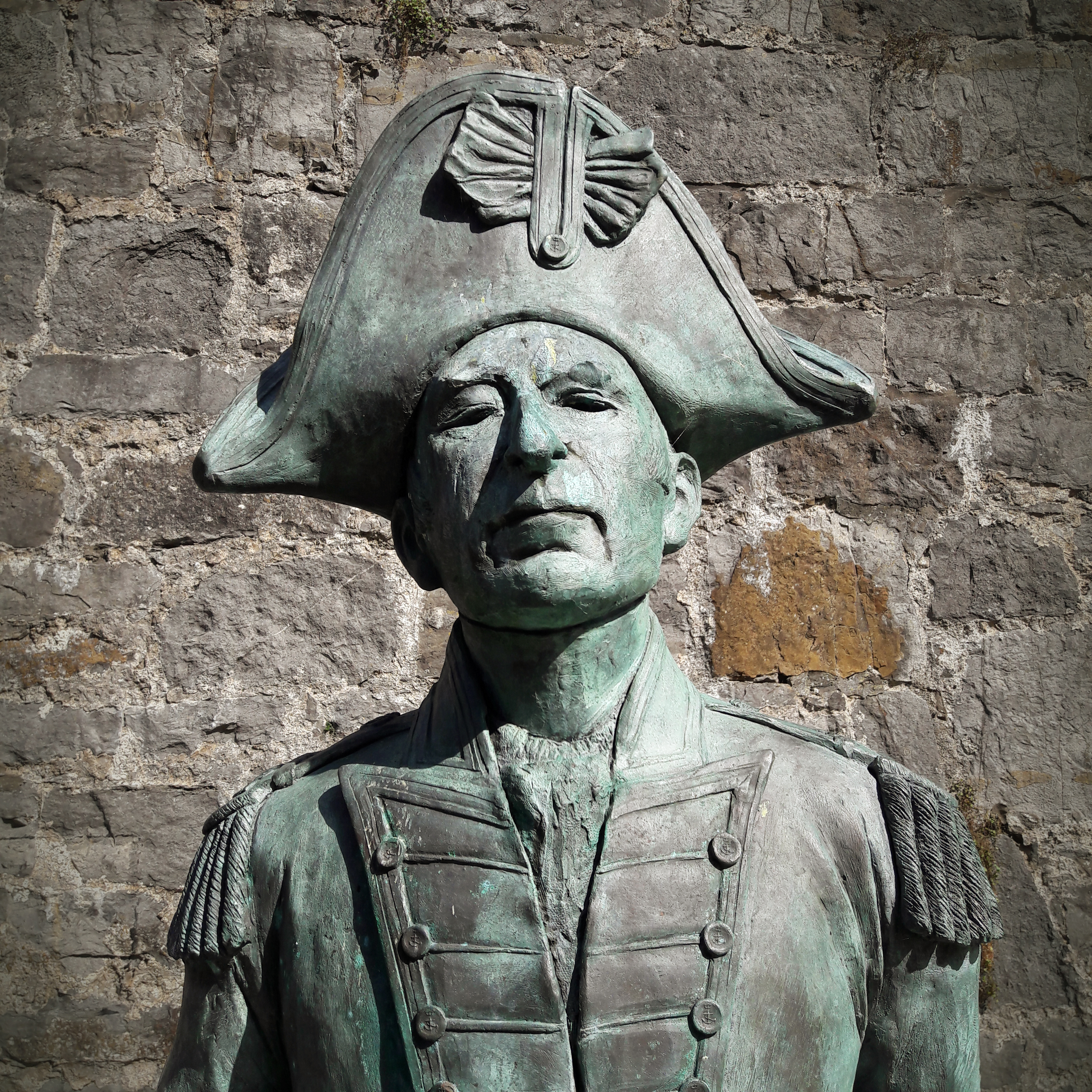
Sculpture of Quilliam at Castle Rushen by Bryan Kneale

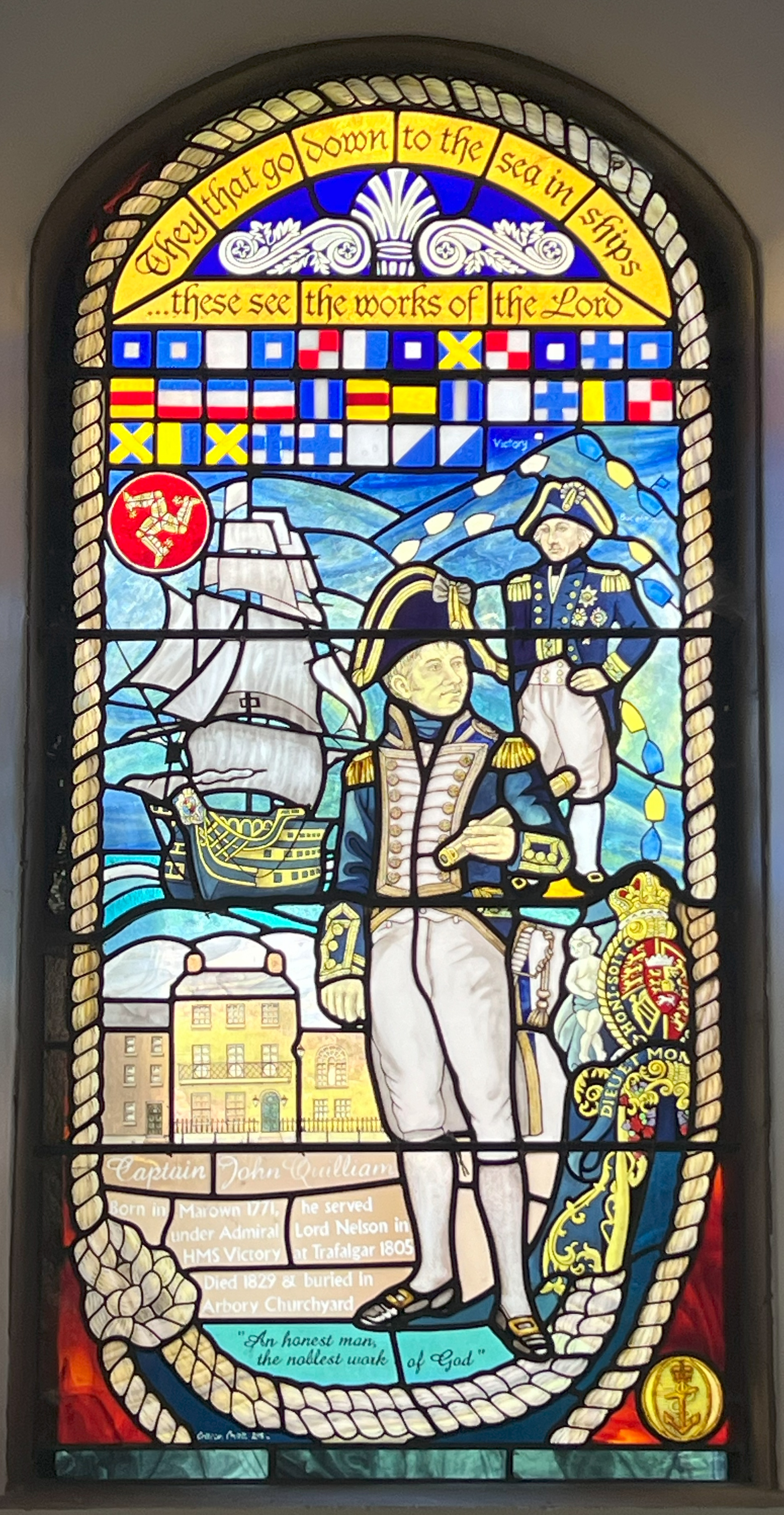
Memorial window in Arbory Parish Church (2015).

- A sculpture of Quilliam by Manx artist Bryan Kneale was unveiled on Trafalgar Day 2005 at Castle Rushen. The sculpture won the 2007 Marsh Award for Excellence in Public Sculpture.
- The uniform of Captain Quilliam is on public display at the Manx Museum, Douglas, Isle of Man.
- To mark the 150th anniversary of his death in 1979, a series of postage stamps by the Isle of Man Post Office dedicated to Capt. Quilliam were released. The four stamps in the series depicted Quilliam being impressed into the Royal Navy, his role at the Battle of Trafalgar, his time in command of HMS Spencer and his subsequent career as a Member of the House of Keys.
