= Admiral O'Brien =

Admiral O'Brien may refer to:

- Donat Henchy O'Brien (1785–1857), British Royal Navy rear admiral
- Edward O'Bryen (sometimes O'Brien) (c. 1753–1808), British Royal Navy rear admiral
- James O'Brien, 3rd Marquess of Thomond (1769–1855), British Royal Navy admiral
- John O'Brien (admiral) (1918–1996), Canadian Forces vice admiral
- William O'Brien (Royal Navy officer) (1916–2016), British Royal Navy admiral
