= Donat Henchy O'Brien =

18th and 19th-century Royal Navy officer

Rear-Admiral Donat Henchy O'Brien
- Donat Henchy O'Brien, portrait from his memoirs
- Born: March 1785; Kingdom of Ireland
- Died: 13 May 1857 (aged 72); Hoddesdon, Hertfordshire
- Military career
- Allegiance: United Kingdom
- Branch: Royal Navy
- Service years: 1796–1857
- Rank: Rear-Admiral
- Commands: HMS Slaney (1818–1821)
- Conflicts: French Revolutionary Wars; Anglo-Russian invasion of Holland; Napoleonic Wars; Battle of Lissa

Rear-Admiral Donat Henchy O'Brien (March 1785 – 13 May 1857) was an officer of the Royal Navy. He was the son of a Royal Navy captain who claimed descent from an ancient Irish king. O'Brien served as a midshipman during the French Revolutionary Wars and commanded a troop-carrying vessel during the Anglo-Russian invasion of Holland. He was afterwards appointed acting lieutenant and served as a master's mate on the frigate Hussar. While returning to England in 1804, the ship was wrecked on the Île de Sein and O'Brien and other crew were captured by the French. O'Brien was imprisoned in France but escaped in 1808 and reached a British vessel at Trieste. He later wrote a book about his experiences.

O'Brien was afterwards promoted to lieutenant and served with the Mediterranean Fleet during the Napoleonic Wars. He distinguished himself in a number of boat actions, capturing numerous warships and cargo vessels. In 1818 O'Brien was posted to the South America Station and served there during the early part of the Argentine Civil Wars. In 1821 he returned to England. O'Brien never served at sea again but was promoted to rear-admiral in the reserve in 1852.

== Early life and career ==
Donat Henchy O'Brien was born in March 1785 in Ireland. He was the second son of Michael O'Brien of Ennistymon, County Clare, a Royal Navy captain who claimed descent from an ancient Irish king and Hannah Henchy of Feenagh, County Clare. O'Brien joined the Royal Navy as an ordinary seaman on 16 December 1796, and served as a midshipman. He served on the Home Station on the 64-gun ship-of-the-line Overyssel (a vessel captured from the Dutch) under the command of Captain John Bazely, and later Captain John Young. O'Brien, despite his lack of experience, was placed in command of one of the ship's boats. During the 1799 Anglo-Russian invasion of Holland he commanded a flat-bottomed boat carrying troops ashore. He afterwards was given command of a hoy which, heavily ballasted with stone, was intended to sink at the entrance of the harbour in Goeree (Goeree-Overflakkee) to block in three Dutch ships-of-the-line. A sudden squall caused the hoy to sink and O'Brien and his crew were rescued, after some difficulty, by a boat from the hired armed cutter Lion.

== Capture and escape ==
In January 1800 O'Brien was appointed acting lieutenant of the 16-gun brig-sloop Atalante, commanded by Captain Anselm John Griffiths. As Atalante was short-handed, lacking a lieutenant, master, boatswain, and gunner, O'Brien remained on board for three months, harassing Dutch shipping off the Flemish banks, Dunkirk and Gravelines. O'Brien afterwards returned to Overyssel and from December 1801 was employed for two periods on board the 54-gun ship-of-the-line Beschermer as master's mate. He passed the lieutenant's exam and was appointed master's mate of the frigate Hussar. Hussar was returning to England with dispatches from Ferrol, Spain, on 8 February 1804 when she grounded on the Île de Sein. The crew were captured by the French and taken into captivity.

O'Brien was imprisoned at Verdun and, from 1807, made attempts to escape, though his first two attempts were thwarted by poor weather and hunger. His third attempt was made in conjunction with Maurice Hewson and fellow Hussar junior officer Henry Ashworth from the citadel at Bitche on 14 September 1808. The men succeeded in reaching Trieste by November and were picked up by a boat from the British frigate Amphion. While on board Amphion O'Brien participated in attacks on two enemy vessels, during which he was wounded in the right arm. He returned to Malta on HMS Spider to join the second-rate ship-of-the line Ocean.

== Mediterranean ==
Ocean was the flagship of Admiral Collingwood who promoted O'Brien to lieutenant on 29 March 1809 and appointed him to the third-rate ship-of-the-line Warrior under Captain John William Spranger. O'Brien served on Warrior during operations associated with the capture of the Ionian Islands. He returned to Amphion, under Captain William Hoste, in March 1810. On 29 June O'Brien commanded the boats of Amphion and Cerberus to provide cover to a landing of sailors and marines at Grao (Grado), Italy, which defeated a French force and captured a large quantity of naval stores bound for Venice. O'Brien served as second lieutenant on Amphion during the 13 March 1811 Battle of Lissa, a significant victory for Hoste against a Franco-Italian force. O'Brien returned to Malta in command of one of the prizes, the frigate Bellona.

Hoste brought O'Brien with him when he assumed command of the newly built 38-gun fifth-rate frigate Bacchante. O'Brien distinguished himself on board this vessel and in command of its boats. This included on the night of 31 August/1 September 1812 when he attacked French and Venetian vessels in Lema Bay (between Vrsar and Rovinj in Istria). O'Brien cut out seven cargo ships carrying shipbuilding timber to Venice and captured the French xebec La Tisiphone and two gunboats, with no British loss of life. On 18 September, commanding six boats and 72 men, he captured eight enemy war vessels and a convoy of 18 cargo ships that Bacchante chased onto the coastline between Tremiti (Tremiti Islands) and Vasto, Italy. In November he commanded boats from Bacchante, Eagle and Achille which landed at Fesano (Fažana), Istria, and, despite a garrison of 300 soldiers, captured a large quantity of oak timber owned by the French government. On 6 January 1813 O'Brien captured three gunboats near Otranto in Southern Italy, with no British casualties.

== Later career ==
O'Brien was promoted to commander on 22 January 1813 and left Bacchante in April, returning to England as a passenger on Watkin Owen Pell's Thunder. O'Brien was without a command until 1818 but in 1814 published an account of his shipwreck on Hussar and his subsequent escape to Trieste. In 1818, after the end of the Napoleonic Wars, he was appointed to command the 20-gun HMS Slaney. He served on the South America Station and, after Admiral Sir Thomas Hardy was posted to the west, was senior commander on the Atlantic coast of this station. O'Brien held this role during the early part of the Argentine Civil Wars, a time when Buenos Aires was at war with neighbouring provinces. He was successful in persuading the Buenos Aires government not to proceed with its intention to draft British residents into its army and to appropriate their possessions. O'Brien was promoted to captain on 5 March 1821 and left South America in October, returning to Britain on board the frigate Owen Glendower.

O'Brien married Hannah Walsley in England on 28 June 1825, and they had seven children together. In 1839 he published a two-volume memoir; this, alongside those published by O'Brien's shipmate Ashworth and by Edward Boys, served as the basis for Frederick Marryat's novel Peter Simple, whose title character was a Royal Navy midshipman. O'Brien would see no further active service but was promoted to rear-admiral on the reserve list on 8 March 1852. He died at Yew House, Hoddesdon, Hertfordshire, on 13 May 1857 and was commemorated in a memorial window in St Augustine's Church, Broxbourne.
