= Henry Ashworth =

Henry Ashworth may refer to:

- Henry Ashworth (Royal Navy officer) (1785–1811), British lieutenant
- Henry Ashworth (nonconformist) (1794–1880), English cotton manufacturer
