= Edward Boys (Royal Navy officer) =

Edward Boys (1785–1866) was an English sea captain.

== Life ==
Edward, son of John Boys (1749–1824), entered the navy in 1796, and after serving in the North Sea, on the coast of Ireland, and in the Channel, was in June 1802 appointed to the frigate, Phoebe.

On 4 August 1803, Boys, when in charge of a prize, was made prisoner by the French, and continued so for six years, when after many daring and ingenious attempts he succeeded in effecting his escape.

On his return to England he was made lieutenant, and served mostly in the West Indies till the peace. On 8 July 1814 he became commander; but, consequent on the reduction of the navy from its war strength, had no further employment afloat, though from 1837 to 1841 he was superintendent of the dockyard at Deal.

On 1 July 1851 he retired with the rank of captain, and died in London on 6 July 1866.

Immediately after his escape, and whilst in the West Indies, he wrote for his family an account of his adventures in France; the risk of getting some of his French friends into trouble had, however, made him keep this account private, and though abstracts from it had found their way into the papers it was not till 1827 that he was persuaded to publish it, under the title of Narrative of a Captivity and Adventures in France and Flanders between the years 1803-9, post 8vo. It is a book of surpassing interest, and the source from which the author of Peter Simple drew much of his account of that hero's escape, more perhaps than from the previously published narrative of Henry Ashworth's adventures. Captain Boys also published in 1831 Remarks on the Practicability and Advantages of a Sandwich or Downs Harbour. One of his sons, the present (1886) Admiral Henry Boys, was captain of the Excellent and superintendent of the Royal Naval College at Portsmouth 1869–74, director of naval ordnance from 1874 to 1878, and second in command of the Channel Fleet in 1878–9.

== See also ==
- O'Byrne, William Richard (1849). "Boys, Edward" . A Naval Biographical Dictionary . John Murray – via Wikisource.

Attribution

- Laughton, John Knox (1886). "Boys, Edward (1785-1866)" . In Stephen, Leslie (ed.). Dictionary of National Biography. Vol. 06. London: Smith, Elder & Co. "[O'Byrne's Dict. of Nav. Biog.; Berry's Kentish Genealogies.]"
