= John Boys (agriculturalist) =

English agriculturist

John Boys (1749–1824) was an English agriculturist.

The only son of William Boys and Ann, daughter of William Cooper of Ripple, he was born in November 1749. At Betshanger and afterwards at Each, Kent, he farmed with skill and success, and as a grazier was well known for his breed of South Down sheep. He was one of the commissioners of sewers for East Kent, and did much to promote the drainage of the Finglesham and Eastry Brooks.

For the Board of Agriculture, Boys wrote A General View of the Agriculture of the County of Kent, 1796, and an Essay on Paring and Burning, 1805. He died on 16 December 1824.

By his wife Mary, daughter of the Rev. Richard Harvey, vicar of Eastry-cum-Word, Boys had thirteen children, eight sons and five daughters. One of these was Edward Boys (1785–1866), a sea captain.
