= Action of 13 March 1806 =

1806 action of the War of the Third Coalition

- Part of the War of the Third Coalition
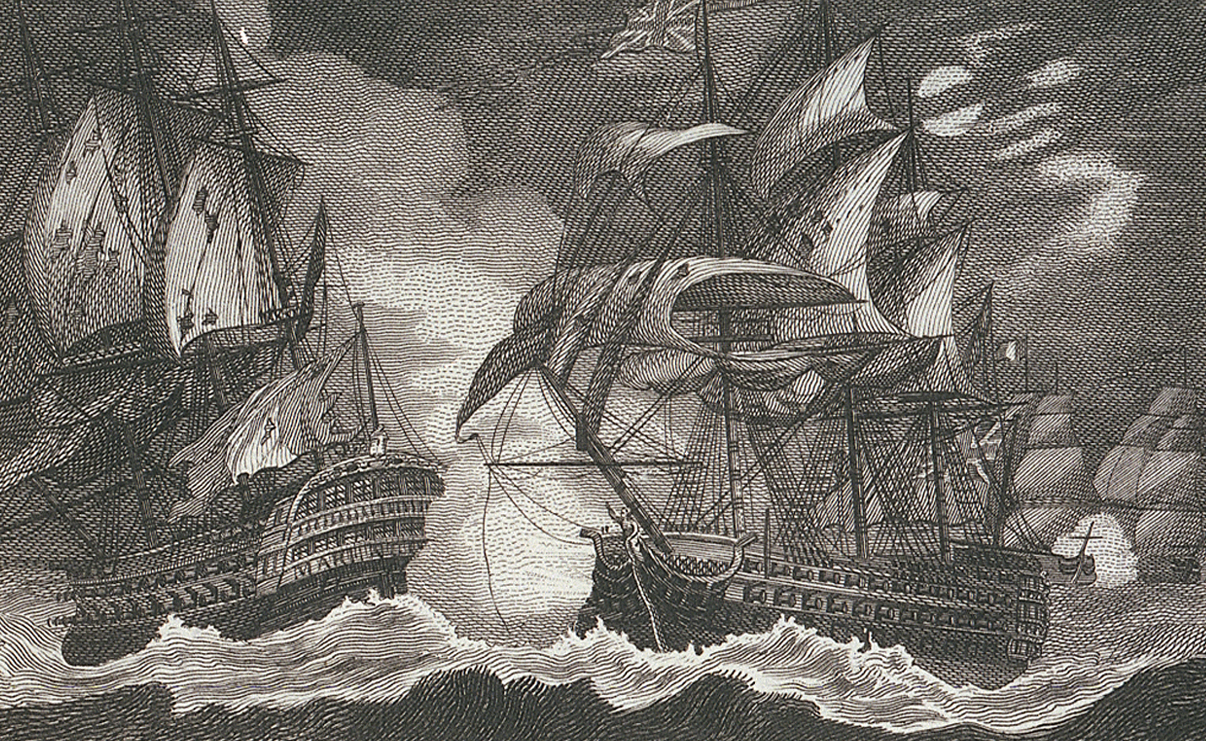
- Contemporary engraving of the action
Date	13 March 1806
Location	Off the Canary Islands, Atlantic Ocean 26°16′N 29°25′W
Result	British victory

Belligerents
United Kingdom	France

Commanders and leaders
John Borlase Warren	Charles-Alexandre Léon Durand Linois (surrendered)

Strength
7 ships of the line 1 frigate	1 ship of the line 1 frigate

Casualties and losses
14 killed 27 wounded	69 killed 107 wounded 1 ship of the line captured 1 frigate captured

The action of 13 March 1806 was a naval engagement of the Napoleonic Wars, fought when a British and a French squadron met unexpectedly in the mid-Atlantic. Neither force was aware of the presence of the other prior to the encounter and were participating in separate campaigns. The British squadron consisted of seven ships of the line accompanied by associated frigates, led by Vice-Admiral of the Blue Sir John Borlase Warren, were tasked with hunting down and destroying the French squadron of Counter-admiral Jean-Baptiste Philibert Willaumez, which had departed Brest for raiding operations in the South Atlantic in December 1805, at the start of the Atlantic campaign of 1806. The French force consisted of one ship of the line and one frigate, all that remained of Counter-admiral Charles-Alexandre Léon Durand Linois' squadron that had sailed for the Indian Ocean in March 1803 during the Peace of Amiens. Linois raided British shipping lanes and harbours across the region, achieving limited success against undefended merchant ships but repeatedly withdrawing in the face of determined opposition, most notably at the Battle of Pulo Aura in February 1804. With his stores almost exhausted and the French ports east of the Cape of Good Hope that could have offered him replenishment eliminated, Linois decided to return to France in January 1806, and by March was inadvertently sailing across the cruising ground of Warren's squadron.

Linois had twice failed to capture, or even seriously engage, large and valuable British merchant convoys on his cruise. When he saw scattered sails in the distance at 03:00 on 13 March 1806, he decided to investigate in his ship of the line Marengo, in the hope that the ships would again prove to be a merchant convoy. By the time he realised that the approaching ships were actually a powerful naval squadron, he was too close to outrun the lead ship, Warren's flagship HMS London. As London engaged Marengo, the French frigate Belle Poule attempted to escape from the approaching squadron independently, but was also run down and brought to battle by the British frigate HMS Amazon. Both engagements lasted over three hours and were bloody, the French ships surrendering after three and a half hours and losing nearly 70 men between them.

The battle marked the end of Linois's three-year campaign against British trade and was the second British victory of the Atlantic campaign, following the Battle of San Domingo the previous month. Willaumez eventually returned to France, although without many of his squadron who were destroyed by British operations or Atlantic gales. Linois, despite the criticism levelled at him for his failures in the Indian Ocean, was considered to have fought hard and been unlucky to have encountered such an overwhelming force. Made a prisoner of war, Linois was not exchanged by Napoleon, who criticised his behaviour during the campaign and refused to employ him at sea again.

== Background ==
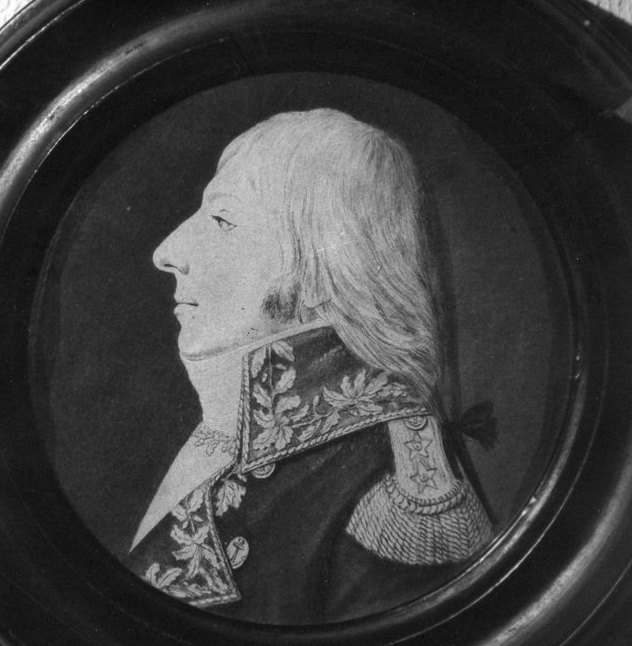
c. 1800 portrait of Linois

In March 1803, a French squadron under Counter-admiral Charles-Alexandre Léon Durand Linois left Brest to operate against British interests in the Indian Ocean. Linois sailed to the South China Sea to intercept the China Fleet, a British merchant convoy which regularly travelled from Canton to Britain and carried goods worth over £8 million. On 15 February 1804, Linois encountered the China Fleet, which due to delays on the part of the Royal Navy had sailed without its naval escort. The convoy's commander, Commodore Nathaniel Dance, ordered his defenceless merchantmen to pretend to be ships of the line and engage Linois' squadron, fooling Linois into fleeing without fighting. The engagement, which became known as the Battle of Pulo Aura, was a humiliation for Linois.

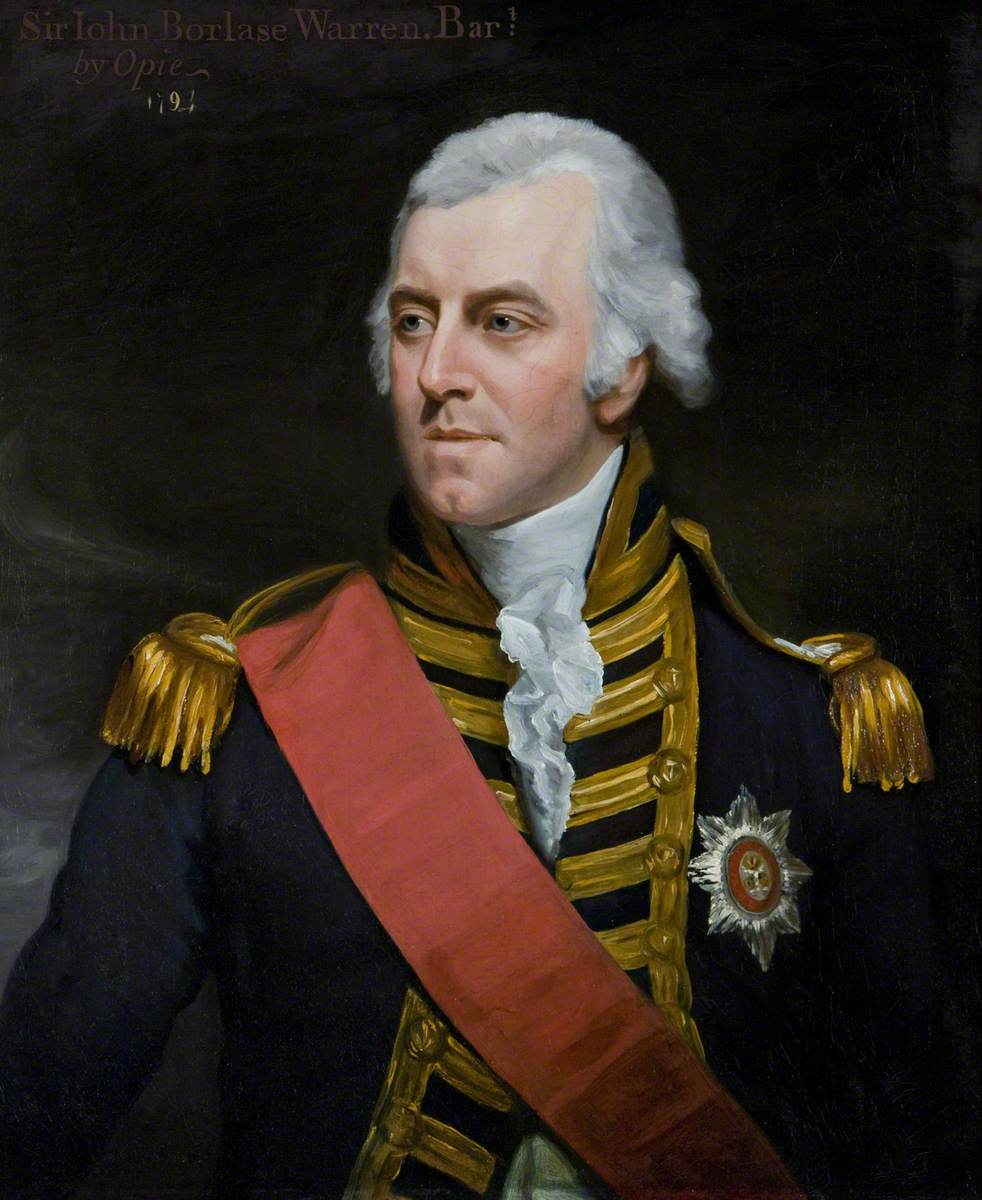
1794 portrait of Warren

Six months later, Linois' squadron encountered HMS Centurion and two East Indiamen under her protection off Visakhapatnam on 18 September 1804. In the ensuing battle, one East Indiaman was captured and the other driven ashore. However, instead of capturing or destroying Centurion Linois withdrew to avoid damaging his ships in the shallow coastal waters. In August 1805, Linois tried to attack another British convoy in the Indian Ocean but was engaged by HMS Blenheim and withdrew. Having failed to make a significant blow on British trade, Linois decided to sail to the Atlantic after discovering that a squadron under Rear-Admiral of the White Sir Edward Pellew was searching for him. Linois' squadron sailed to the Dutch Cape Colony, where one of his frigates was wrecked. He proceeded to cruise off the West African coast, again failing to make a significant blow. Learning from an American ship that Britain had occupied the Cape Colony, Linois decided to return to France, sailing northwards and crossing the equator on 17 February.

Unknown to Linois, he was sailing directly into the middle of the Atlantic campaign of 1806. On 13 December, two French squadrons sailed from Brest under orders to operate against British Atlantic trade. The first, under Counter-admiral Corentin Urbain de Leissègues, sailed for the Caribbean, while the second, under Counter-admiral Jean-Baptiste Philibert Willaumez, sailed for the South Atlantic. In response, the British rapidly mustered three squadrons in pursuit. The first, under Rear-Admiral of the Blue Sir Richard Strachan, was ordered to the South Atlantic. The second, under Vice-Admiral of the Blue Sir John Borlase Warren, was sent to the mid-Atlantic, while the third, under Vice-Admiral of the Blue Sir John Duckworth, was detached from the British blockade of Cádiz. Duckworth pursued Leissègues to the Caribbean and on 6 February annihilated his squadron, but Willaumez avoided encountering any of the squadrons sent to intercept him. Anticipating Willaumez's return to France, the remaining British squadrons took up station in the Mid-Atlantic.

== Battle ==
On 13 March 1806, Warren's squadron was cruising in the Eastern Atlantic. Most of the squadron were grouped to the northwest, but HMS London under Captain Sir Harry Burrard-Neale and the flagship HMS Foudroyant under Captain John Chambers White were sailing together some distance from the rest of the British force, in company with the frigate HMS Amazon under Captain William Parker. At 03:00, sails were spotted to the north-east by lookouts on London. Hastening in pursuit with the wind from the south-west, Captain Neale signalled the location of the strange ships to Warren with blue lights, the admiral following with Amazon and the rest of the squadron trailing behind. To the north-east, Linois had also sighted sails in the distance and turned Marengo south-west in pursuit, anticipating a third encounter with a valuable merchant convoy. Captain Alain-Adélaïde-Marie Bruilhac of Belle Poule insisted that the sails were from British warships, but Linois over-ruled him, arguing that any warships would be part of the convoy's escort and could be avoided in the night. It was not until 05:30, when London appeared from the gloom just ahead of Marengo that Linois realised his mistake. He attempted to escape, but his ships had been at sea for an extended period and were sluggish compared to the 98-gun London, which rapidly came alongside the French ship of the line and opened a heavy fire.

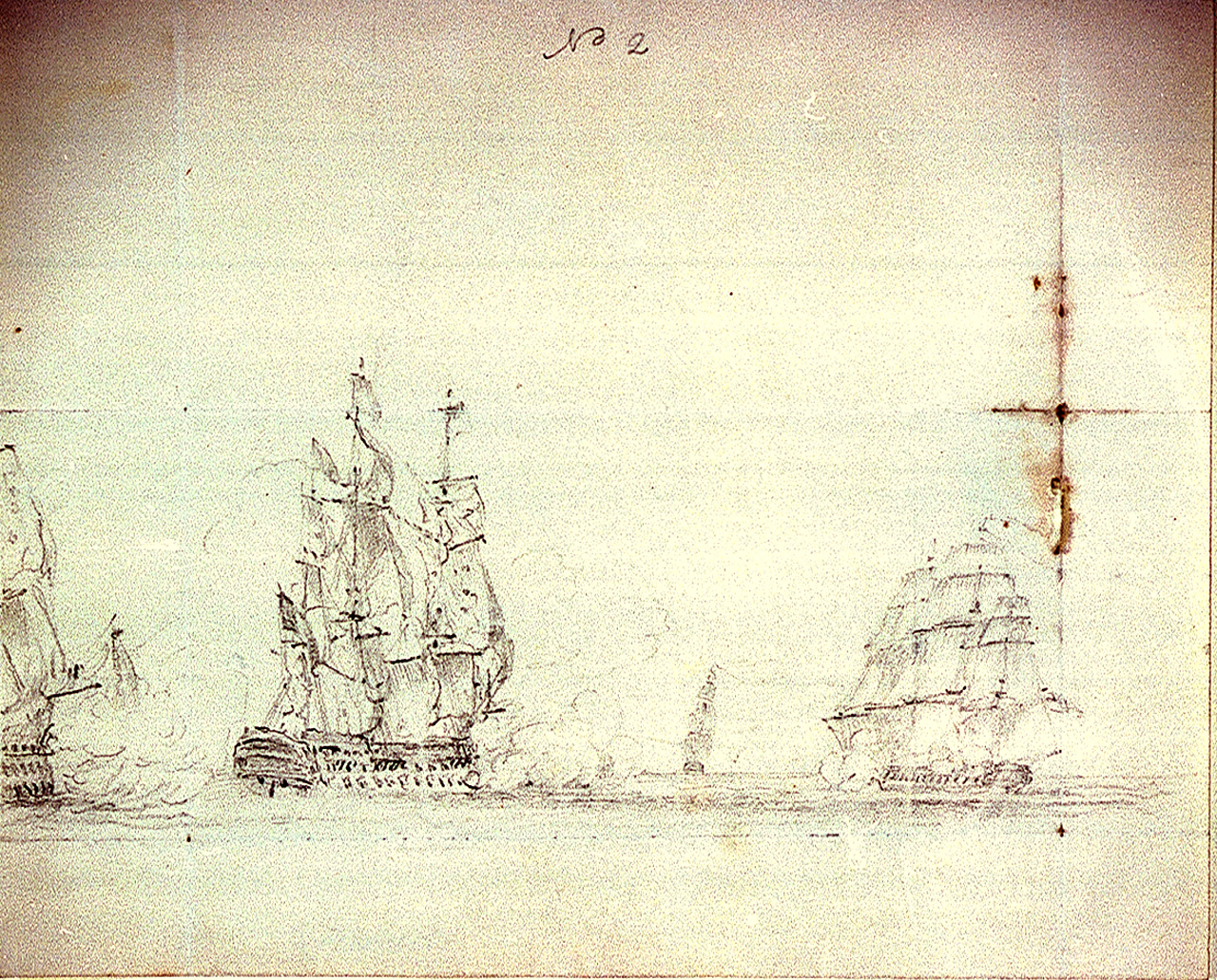
Illustration of the battle by Nicholas Pocock

Linois returned London's fire as best he could, but by 06:00 he realised that he was outmatched and swung away, issuing orders for Captain Bruilhac in Belle Poule to escape as best he could. The frigate however, which had been firing at London during the battle, continued engaging the larger ship to give Linois support as he attempted to pull away. At 06:15, Bruilhac sighted Amazon bearing down and also withdrew, pulling ahead of Neale's ship which continued to fire into Marengo. Both Marengo and London had suffered severe damage to their rigging, and neither were able to effectively manoeuvre: as a result, Linois was unable to avoid either Neale's continued fire or shots from Amazon as Parker swept past in pursuit of Belle Poule. By 08:30, Parker's frigate was alongside Bruilhac's and the ships exchanged fire over the next two hours, Amazon succeeding in damaging Belle Poule's rigging to prevent her escape. Behind the battling frigates, Marengo had taken further battering from London and by 10:25 also came under fire from Foudroyant, and HMS Repulse under Captain Arthur Kaye Legge. HMS Ramillies under Captain Francis Pickmore was also rapidly coming into range. In the face of this overwhelming force, the French ship of the line had no option but to surrender, although by the time the tricolour was lowered at nearly 11:00, both Linois and Captain Joseph-Marie Vrignaud had been taken below with serious wounds.

Almost simultaneously with the surrender of Marengo, Captain Bruilhac surrendered Belle Poule, the damage inflicted by Amazon and the presence of Warren's squadron persuading him that further resistance was hopeless. French losses in the engagement were severe, Marengo suffering extensive damage to her hull and rigging and losing 63 men killed and 83 wounded from a crew of 740. The latter included both Linois and his son with serious wounds and Captain Vrignaud, who had to have his right arm amputated. Losses on Belle Poule included six killed and 24 wounded from her complement of 330. British losses were comparatively light, London suffering ten dead and 22 wounded and Amazon four killed and five wounded. London was the only British ship damaged, mainly in her rigging, which was hastily repaired in the aftermath of the battle.

== Aftermath ==
On 23 April, a heavy storm swept the Eastern Atlantic, striking Warren's squadron and their prizes. Marengo was seriously damaged, losing all three masts and taking on a large quantity of water that had to be pumped overboard by the understrength crew working in shifts. Five men were drowned. Ramilles also suffered in the high winds, losing almost all her masts and rolling for some hours, completely out of control. It was only when the storm had abated that jury masts could be raised and the scattered ships could rejoin the squadron for its journey back to Britain, arriving at Spithead. Willaumez eventually returned to the North Atlantic in the early summer, passing through the Caribbean before being dispersed in a hurricane, his ships scattered across the Western Atlantic. Most eventually reached France, but the campaign had been another disaster for the French Navy, with less than half of the ships sent out returning to Brest. The loss of Marengo and Belle Poule formed a footnote to the campaign, but the defeat of Linois was widely celebrated in Britain, where both ships were commissioned into the Royal Navy under their French names. Linois was praised for his defence of his ship in the face of overwhelming British force, and historian William James, writing in 1827, considered that had Linois faced London alone he might have had the advantage. Four decades later the battle was among the actions recognised by a clasp attached to the Naval General Service Medal, awarded upon application to all British participants from London and Amazon still living in 1847.

The engagement was not quite the end for Linois' squadron: the last survivor, the frigate Sémillante had originally been ordered to sail for Mexico in March 1805. This plan was foiled by an encounter with the British frigate HMS Phaeton in the Philippines, and Captain Léonard-Bernard Motard returned to the Indian Ocean, operating for the next three years against British shipping from Île de France. Eventually the old frigate was assessed as worn out and sold from service in 1808, operating as a privateer for a year before she was captured in 1809. Napoleon refused to exchange Linois for a British prisoner, and the Emperor's fury at the admiral's failures in the Indian Ocean prevented any subsequent appointments. In 1814, after Napoleon's abdication, the new French regime made Linois governor of Martinique, but when the Hundred Days began, Linois declared for Napoleon and British forces invaded and captured the colony. His career over, Linois retired. He died some 34 years later, in 1848.
