= Sir William Parker, 1st Baronet, of Shenstone =

Royal Navy Admiral of the Fleet (1781–1866)

Admiral of the Fleet Sir William Parker Bt GCB
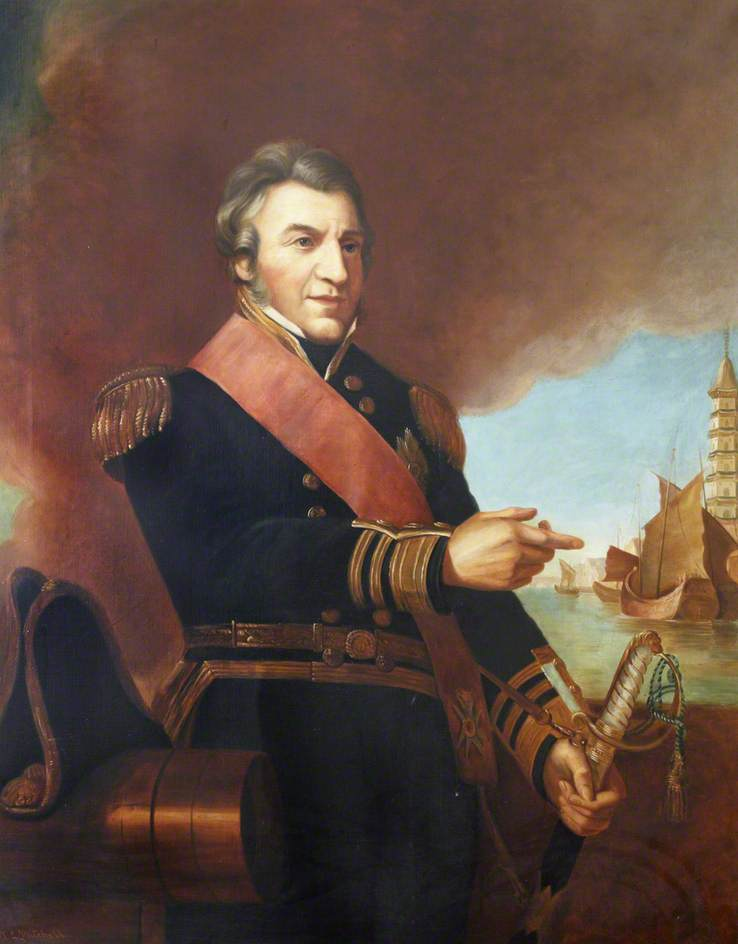
- Portrait by A. L. Mitchell
- Born: 1 December 1781; Almington, Staffordshire
- Died: 13 November 1866 (aged 84) Shenstone, Staffordshire
- Allegiance: Great Britain; United Kingdom
- Branch: Royal Navy
- Service years: 1793–1857
- Rank: Admiral of the Fleet
- Commands: HMS Stork; HMS Alarm; HMS Amazon; HMS Warspite; HMS Prince Regent; East Indies and China Station; Mediterranean Fleet; Plymouth Command
- Conflicts: French Revolutionary Wars; Napoleonic Wars; Liberal Wars; First Opium War
- Awards: Knight Grand Cross of the Order of the Bath

Admiral of the Fleet Sir William Parker, 1st Baronet, GCB (1 December 1781 – 13 November 1866) was a Royal Navy officer. As a captain's servant he took part in the Glorious First of June on 1 June 1794 during the French Revolutionary Wars and, as a captain, he participated in the capture of the French ships Marengo and Belle Poule at the action of 13 March 1806 during the Napoleonic Wars. He was detached on an independent command on the Tagus in September 1831 with a mission to protect British interests during the Portuguese Civil War. As Commander-in-chief of the East Indies and China Station, he provided naval support at various actions between 1841 and 1842 during the First Opium War. Appointed Commander-in-Chief, Mediterranean Fleet in February 1845, he was briefly (for a week) First Naval Lord in the First Russell ministry from 13 July 1846 to 24 July 1846 but gave up the role due to ill health before returning to his command with the Mediterranean Fleet.

== Early career ==
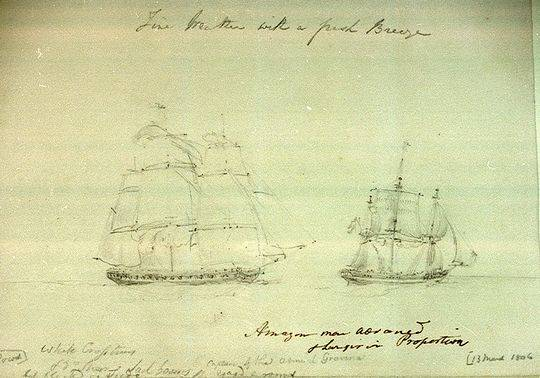
The fifth-rate HMS Amazon (left), a ship which Parker commanded

Born the son of George Parker (himself the second son of Sir Thomas Parker who had been Lord Chief Baron of the Exchequer), William Parker entered the Royal Navy in February 1793 as a captain's servant on the third-rate HMS Orion, serving under Captain John Duckworth. In the Orion, which was part of the Channel Fleet commanded by Lord Howe, Parker took part in the Battle of The Glorious First of June in June 1794 during the French Revolutionary Wars. When Captain Duckworth was assigned to another ship, the third-rate HMS Leviathan, Parker followed him, and sailed with him to the West Indies Station where Duckworth appointed him acting lieutenant in the fifth-rate HMS Magicienne. He was appointed to the second-rate HMS Queen, flagship of Admiral Sir Hyde Parker, in May 1798 and he became acting captain of the sixth-rate HMS Volage on 1 May 1799. Promoted to lieutenant on 5 September 1799, he cruised for the next few months in HMS Volage in the Gulf of Mexico and off the coast of Cuba. Promoted to commander on 10 October 1799, he was given command of the sloop HMS Stork in November 1799. He returned to England and then spent nearly a year in HMS Stork in the North Sea or with the blockade fleet off Brest.

Promoted to captain on 9 October 1801, Parker assumed command of the sixth-rate HMS Alarm in March 1802 and then the fifth-rate HMS Amazon in October 1802 and remained with her for the next 9 years. The Amazon was attached to the fleet under Admiral Lord Nelson engaged in the pursuit of the French fleet to the West Indies. She was then sent on a cruise westward and therefore missed the Battle of Trafalgar. The Amazon was later attached to a squadron under Admiral Sir John Warren, participating in the capture of the French ships Marengo and Belle Poule at the action of 13 March 1806 during the Napoleonic Wars. After Amazon was paid off in January 1812, Parker went onto half-pay. He was appointed a Companion of the Order of the Bath on 4 June 1815.

Parker purchased Shenstone Lodge near Lichfield, where he lived for the next 15 years. He returned to sea as captain of the third-rate HMS Warspite in 1827, and acted as senior officer off the coast of Greece in 1828. He was given command the yacht HMS Prince Regent in December 1828 and, having been promoted to rear-admiral on 22 July 1830, he was appointed second-in-command of the Channel Squadron, under Sir Edward Codrington, in April 1831. He was detached on an independent command on the Iberian Tagus River, hoisting his flag aboard the second-rate HMS Asia, in September 1831 with a mission to protect British interests during the Portuguese Civil War. He was advanced to Knight Commander of the Order of the Bath on 16 July 1834.

Parker returned to England and briefly served as Second Naval Lord in the Wellington caretaker ministry from August 1834 to December 1834. He became Second Sea Lord again, this time in the Second Melbourne ministry, in April 1835.

== Senior command ==
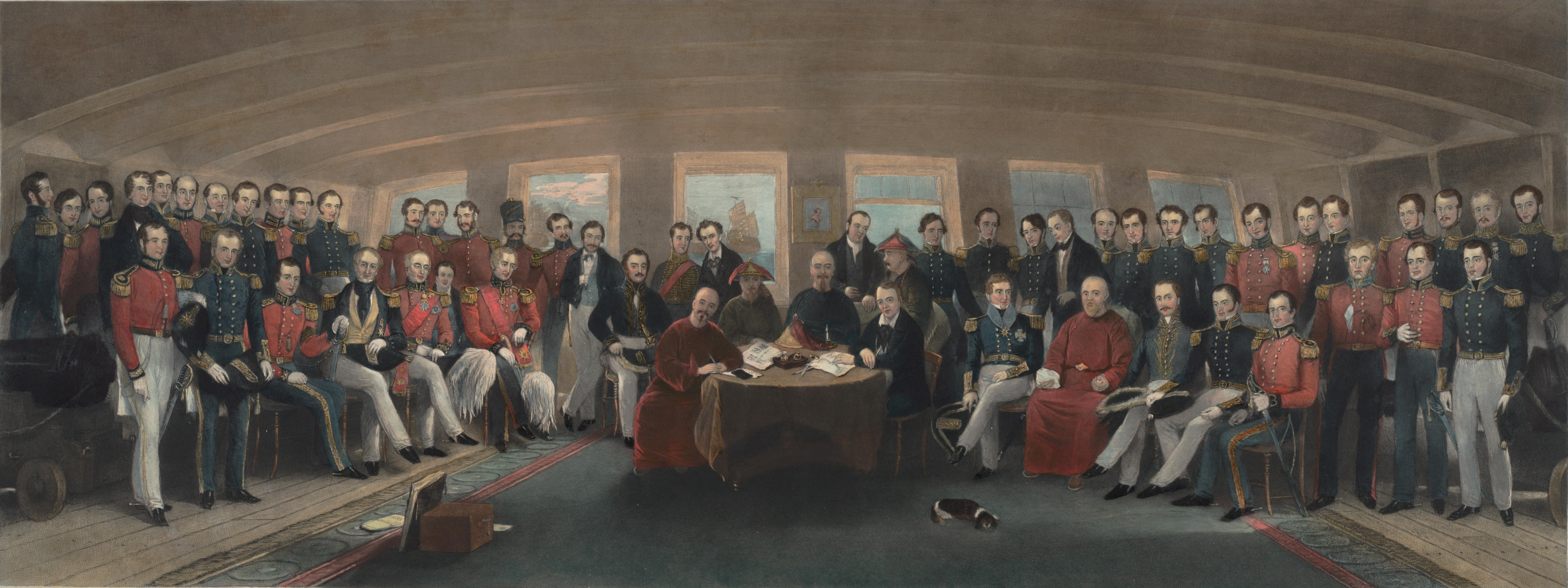
The Treaty of Nanking being signed on board HMS Cornwallis, Parker's Flagship as Commander-in-Chief, East Indies and China Station. Parker is seated at the front row (fifth from right), between interpreter Robert Thom and General Hien Ling.

Parker left the Admiralty to become Commander-in-chief of the East Indies and China Station, hoisting his flag in the third-rate HMS Cornwallis, in June 1841. He provided naval support at the Battle of Amoy in August 1841, and having been promoted to vice-admiral on 23 November 1841, also took part in the Battle of Ningpo in March 1842, the Battle of Woosung in June 1842 and the Battle of Chinkiang in July 1842 during the First Opium War.

Parker was advanced to Knight Grand Cross of the Order of the Bath on 2 December 1842, given a substantial good-service pension on 26 April 1844 and awarded a baronetcy on 11 November 1844. He became Commander-in-Chief, Mediterranean Fleet, hoisting his flag in the first-rate HMS Hibernia in February 1845. In May 1846, because of his knowledge of Portugal and its politics, he was given the additional command of the Channel Squadron while still remaining in charge of the Mediterranean Fleet. He was briefly (for a week) First Naval Lord in the First Russell ministry from 13 July 1846 to 24 July 1846 but gave up the role due to ill health before returning to his command with the Mediterranean Fleet.

Promoted to full admiral on 29 April 1851, Parker became Commander-in-Chief, Plymouth in May 1854. He retired in May 1857, and, having been promoted to Admiral of the Fleet on 27 April 1863, he died from bronchitis on 13 November 1866. He was buried in the churchyard at St John the Baptist Parish Church in Shenstone, and a monument to his memory was erected in Lichfield Cathedral.

== Family ==
In 1810 Parker married Frances Anne Biddulph; they had two sons and six daughters.

== Sources ==
- Heathcote, Tony (2002). The British Admirals of the Fleet 1734–1995. Pen & Sword Ltd. ISBN 0-85052-835-6.

Military offices
| Preceded by George Dundas | Second Naval Lord; 1834 | Succeeded by Sir John Beresford, Bt |
| Preceded by Sir John Beresford, Bt | Second Naval Lord; 1835–1841 | Succeeded by Sir Edward Troubridge, Bt |
| Preceded by Sir Gordon Bremer | Commander-in-Chief, East Indies and China Station; 1841–1844 | Succeeded by Sir Thomas Cochrane |
| Preceded by Sir Edward Owen | Commander-in-Chief, Mediterranean Fleet; 1845 – 13 July 1846 | Vacant for One Week Title next held by himself |
| Preceded by Sir George Cockburn | First Naval Lord; 13 July 1846 – 24 July 1846 | Succeeded by Sir Charles Adam |
| Vacant for One Week Title last held by himself | Commander-in-Chief, Mediterranean Fleet; 24 July 1846 – 1852 | Succeeded by Sir James Dundas |
| Preceded by Sir John Ommanney | Commander-in-Chief, Plymouth; 1854–1857 | Succeeded by Sir Barrington Reynolds |
Honorary titles
| Preceded by Lord Amelius Beauclerk | First and Principal Naval Aide-de-Camp; 1846–1866 | Succeeded by The Earl of Lauderdale |
| Preceded by Sir Francis Austen | Rear-Admiral of the United Kingdom; 1862–1863 | Succeeded by Sir George Seymour |
Baronetage of the United Kingdom
| New title | Baronet (of Shenstone); 1844–1866 | Succeeded by William Biddulph Parker |
