= Trelawney (1783 ship) =

British merchant ship (1783–1803)

History

Great Britain
- Name: Trelawney
- Launched: 1783, Liverpool
- Captured: 1800 (twice)
- Fate: Wrecked, 19 February 1803

General characteristics
- Tons burthen: 560, or 616, or 635, or 640 (bm)
- Length: 125 ft 3 in (38.2 m)
- Beam: 34 ft 0 in (10.4 m)
- Complement: 1793:35; 1800:70; 1801:30
- Armament: 1793:12 × 9-pounder guns; 1800:24 × 9-pounder guns; 1801:24 × 9&12-pounder guns
- Notes: Three decks & three masts

Trelawney (or Trelawny) was launched in 1783 in Liverpool as a West Indiaman. In 1800 a French privateer captured her as Trelawney was sailing to the Mediterranean, but the Royal Navy quickly recaptured her. The ship traded with North America until she was wrecked on 19 February 1803.

== Career ==
Trelawney was reported to have been originally intended to be a 36-gun frigate. She first appeared in Lloyd's Register (LR) in 1784.

Year	Master	Owner	Trade	Source & notes
1784	Harrison	Richard Watts	Liverpool–Jamaica	LR

In July 1788 Trelawney, Harrison, master, arrived at Liverpool from Jamaica. She brought with her the crew of Morant, Aikin master. Morant had been wrecked on the Key of the Cockscombs while sailing from Jamaica to Bristol. (Note: Morant, of 300 tons (bm), had been launched at Philadelphia in 1773, and lengthened in 1776.)

On 19 October 1790 Captain Henry Bunster replaced Captain Thomas Harrison as master of Trelawney, however the change did not appear in Lloyd's Register. Then on 15 November 1791 Captain John Gillis replaced Captain Bunster.

Year	Master	Owner	Trade	Source & notes
1792	Harrison; J.Gillis	Watt & Co.	Liverpool–Jamaica	LR; raised 1785
1793	Gillis; R.Cummins	Watt & Co.	Liverpool–Jamaica	LR; raised 1785

On 22 October 1793, Captain Robert Cummins replaced Gillis. War with France had broken out in early 1793 and on 17 October Cummins acquired a letter of marque.

In 1796 Trelawney was sold to residents of Glasgow.

Year	Master	Owner	Trade	Source & notes
1796	Cummins; J.Malcolm	Watt & Co.	Liverpool–Jamaica	LR; raised 1784
1797	Malcolm; N.Kennedy	Hunter & Co.	Liverpool–Nova Scotia	LR; raised 1784 & repaired 1795
1798	Kennedy; J.Lockart	Hunter & Co.	Bristol–Halifax; Liverpool Martinique	LR; raised 1784, repaired 1795 & 1798
1800	Kenedy; Lockhard	Taylor & Co. Hume	Liverpool−Martinique; Liverpool–Leghorn	LR; repairs 1798

Captain John Lockhard acquired a letter of marque on 7 January 1800.

On 14 February 1800 HMS Endymion and Amazon recaptured Trelawney, which had been sailing from Liverpool to Leghorn when the French Saint Malo privateer Bougainville captured her. Amazon also captured Bougainville, of eighteen 6-pounder guns and eighty-two men. The next day Bougainville ran into Amazon, lost her masts and foundered, but all but one man of her crew were saved. Amazon, including Bougainville's crew, Endymion, and Trelawney arrived at Portsmouth on 21 February. (Note: Bougainville had been commissioned in 1799 with 82 men and 18 guns. Her homeport is unknown.)

Year	Master	Owner	Trade	Source & notes
1801	P.Lockard; D.Stamper	Bayley & Co. Hulme & Co.	Liverpool–Leghorn; Liverpool-Virginia	LR; raised 1784, repaired 1795 & 1798, and large repair 1802
1802	D.Stamper; L.Afflick	D.Hulme & Co.	Liverpool-Virginia	LR; raised 1784, repaired 1795 & 1798, and large repair 1802

On 5 February 1801 Captain Isaac Duck acquired a letter of marque. On 28 December 1801 he returned to Liverpool from Virginia. His tenure as master of Trelawney did not appear in Lloyd's Register.

== Fate ==
On 19 February 1803 Trelawney, Affleck, master, was returning to Liverpool from Baltimore. Off Liverpool, she took on board a pilot. Shortly thereafter she grounded on the Mad-Wharf sandbank, was refloated, but found to be so leaky that she was run onshore near Ravenglass, about 16 miles from Whitehaven, with 15 feet of water in her hold. The passengers were put ashore, but five lives were lost when a boat returning to the ship capsized. It was later reported that, despite hopes of salvage, she went to pieces on 25 February.
