= HMS Amazon (1799) =

Royal Navy fifth-rate frigate

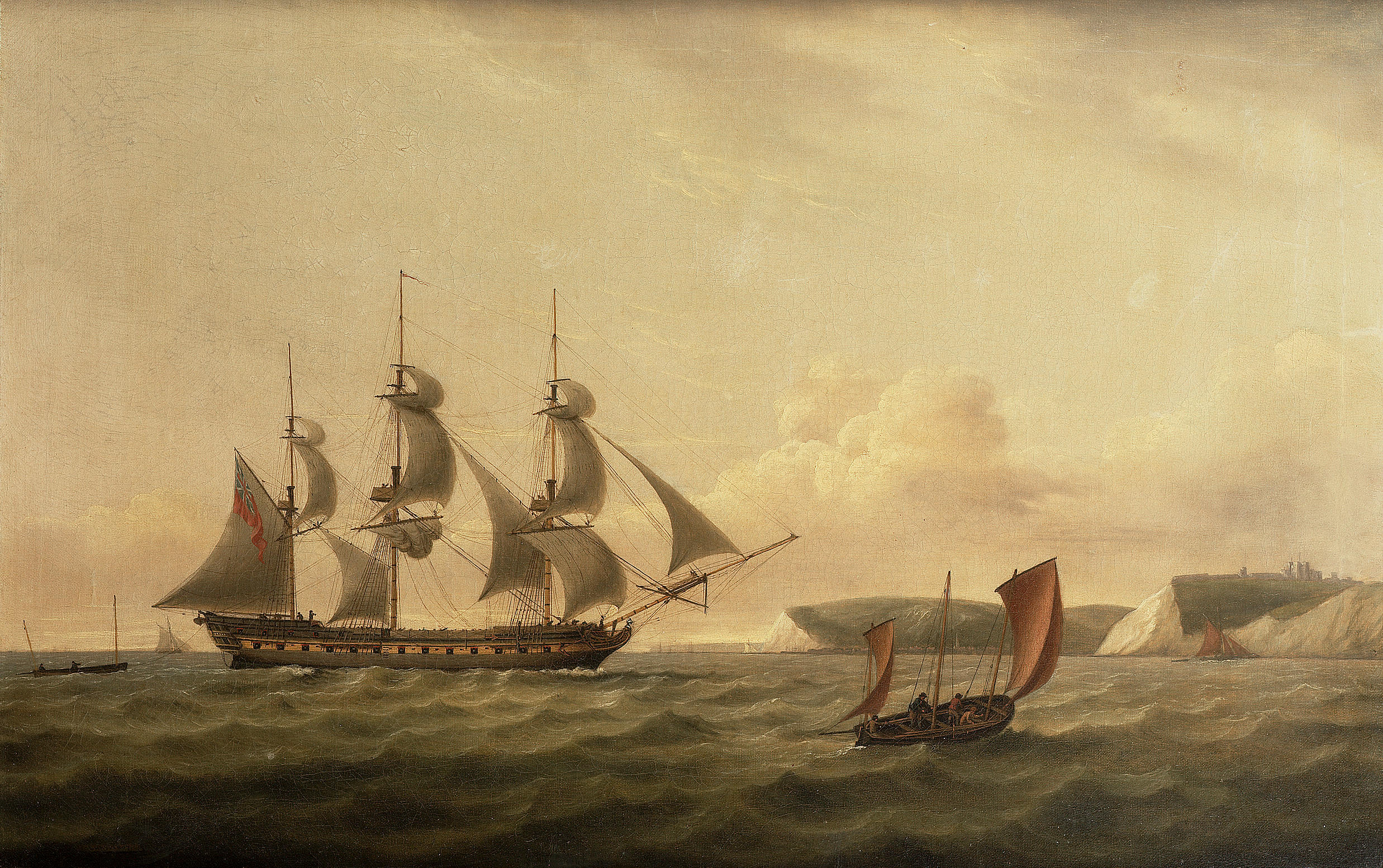
- His Majesty's frigate Amazon, arriving off Dover, by Thomas Luny

History

Great Britain
- Name: HMS Amazon
- Ordered: 27 April 1796
- Builder: Woolwich Dockyard
- Cost: £33,972
- Laid down: April 1796
- Launched: 18 May 1799
- Completed: 5 July 1799
- Commissioned: May 1799
- Fate: Broken up May 1817

General characteristics
- Class & type: Fifth-rate Amazon-class frigate
- Tons burthen: 1,038 6/94 (bm)
- Length: 150 ft (45.7 m) (upper deck); 125 ft 7 3/4 in (38.3 m) (keel)
- Beam: 39 ft 5 in (12.0 m)
- Draught: 11 ft 3 in (3.4 m) (forward); 15 ft 3 in (4.6 m) (aft)
- Depth of hold: 13 ft 9 in (4.19 m)
- Propulsion: Sails
- Sail plan: Full-rigged ship
- Complement: 284 (later 300)
- Armament: UD: 28 × 18-pounder guns; QD: 2 × 9-pounder guns + 12 × 32-pounder carronades; Fc: 2 × 9-pounder guns + 2 × 32-pounder carronades

HMS Amazon was a 38-gun fifth-rate Amazon-class frigate of the Royal Navy. She served during the French Revolutionary and Napoleonic Wars under several notable naval commanders and played a key role in the Battle of Copenhagen under Edward Riou, who commanded the frigate squadron during the attack. After Riou was killed during the battle, command briefly devolved to John Quilliam. Quilliam made a significant impression on Horatio Nelson, who appointed Quilliam to serve on the flagship HMS Victory. Amazon passed to William Parker, who continued the association with Nelson with service in the Mediterranean and participation in the chase to the West Indies during the Trafalgar Campaign. Amazon went on to join Sir John Borlase Warren's squadron in the Atlantic and took part in the defeat of Charles-Alexandre Léon Durand Linois's forces at the action of 13 March 1806. During the battle, she hunted down and captured the 40-gun frigate Belle Poule.

Amazon continued in service for several more years, being active in combating raiders and privateers, before being withdrawn from active service in late 1811. She was retained in ordinary for several years after the end of the Napoleonic Wars, before being broken up in 1817.

== Design and construction ==
Amazon was a 38-gun, 18-pounder, fifth-rate Amazon-class frigate. The ship was one of two built to the design, along with HMS Hussar. The ship's plans were drawn up by the Surveyor of the Navy Sir William Rule, who submitted the design on 19 April 1796. They were an enlarged version of a previous design by Rule, the 38-gun HMS Naiad. Naiad was in turn an expanded version of another, older, Rule ship class, this being the Amazon class designed in 1794.

Amazon was ordered on 27 April 1796 to be built at Woolwich Dockyard by the shipwright John Tovery. Amazon was laid down in the same month, and launched on 18 May 1799 with the following dimensions: 150 feet (45.7 m) along the upper deck, 125 feet 7 3/4 inches (38.3 m) at the keel, with a beam of 39 feet 5 inches (12.0 m) and a depth in the hold of 13 feet 9 inches (4.2 m). The ship had a draught of 11 feet 3 inches (3.4 m) forward and 15 feet 3 inches (4.6 m) aft, and measured 1,0386/94 tons burthen. She was built precisely to Rule's design. The fitting out process was completed on 5 July, with the final cost of construction totalling £33,972.

Amazon's class was described in sailing reports as "fast and very weatherly", as well as being highly manoeuvrable. They were capable of reaching up to 13 knots (24.1 km/h) and showed sailing qualities superior to most other vessels, especially when in a "stiff breeze". The ships were, however, known for "deep and uneasy rolling and pitching", which naval historian Robert Gardiner suggests was because they were built very stiffly. (Note: Sailing reports based on Amazon 31 December 1811 and 15 February 1812.)

The frigate had a crew complement of 284, which would later be raised to 300, and held twenty-eight 18-pounder guns on the upper deck. Rule had originally planned for the quarterdeck to hold eight 9-pounder guns and the forecastle to hold a further two, but on 6 May 1797 six 32-pounder carronades were added to the quarterdeck armament and two more to the forecastle. Amazon's armament was changed again on 6 June and 2 July 1799, with all but two 9-pounders on each of the quarterdeck and forecastle replaced by more carronades. (Note: This final change in carronades came about because of an Admiralty Order of 31 May 1799 that ordered all new frigates fitting out to be provided with a higher quantity, depending on their size. 9-pounders were only kept in portholes that were partially obscured by rigging.) This resulted in a final armament of twelve 32-pounder carronades and two 9-pounder guns on the quarterdeck, and two 32-pounder carronades and two 9-pounder guns on the forecastle, in addition to Amazon's main 18-pounder guns.

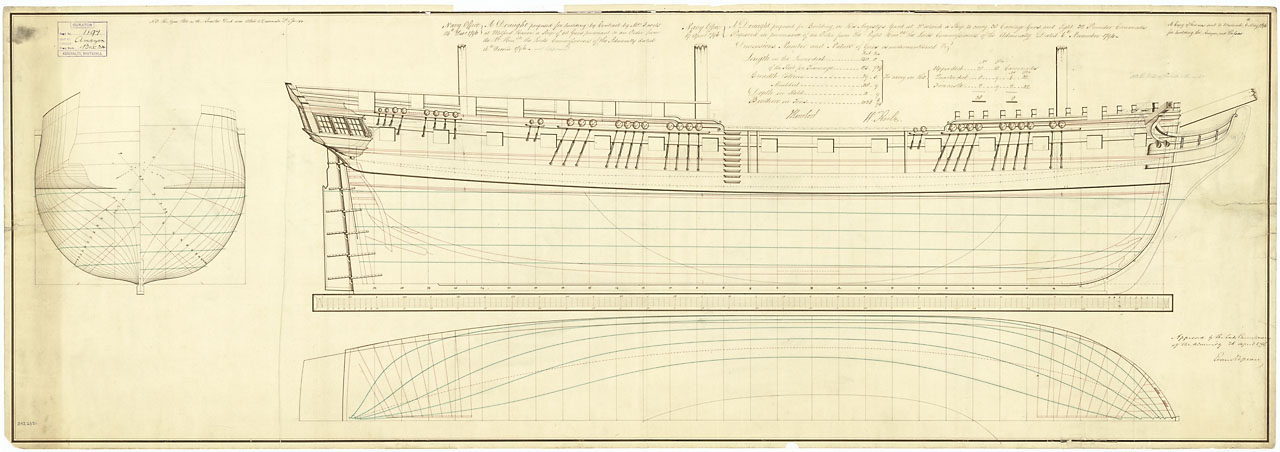
Design of Amazon and Hussar

== Service ==
=== British waters and the Baltic ===
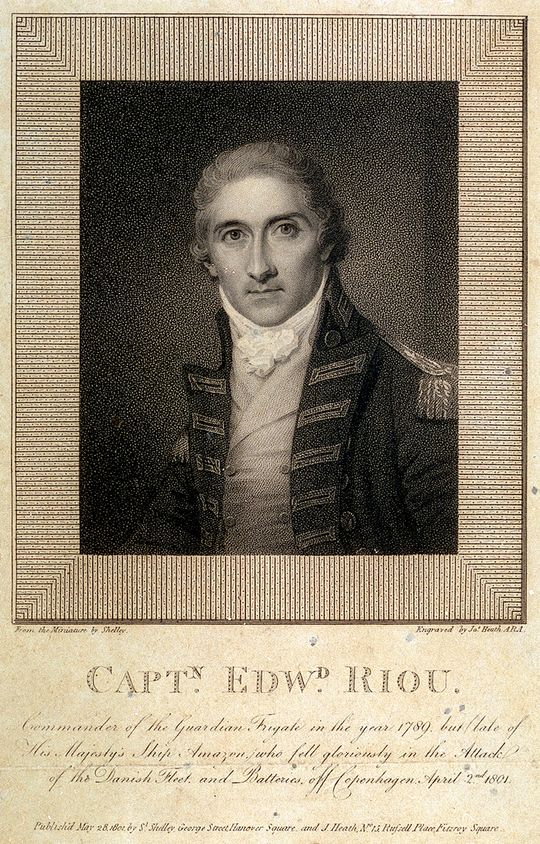
1801 engraving of Amazon's first commander Edward Riou

Amazon was commissioned in May 1799 by Captain Edward Riou. On 14 February 1800 HMS Endymion and Amazon recaptured the merchant ship Trelawney, which had been sailing from Liverpool to Leghorn when the French Saint Malo privateer Bougainville captured her. Amazon also captured Bougainville, of eighteen 6-pounder guns and eighty-two men. The next day Bougainville ran into Amazon, lost her masts and foundered, but all but one man of her crew were saved. Amazon, including Bougainville's crew, Endymion, and Trelawney arrived at Portsmouth on 21 February.

Amazon sailed from Portsmouth for Jamaica alongside the 44-gun ship HMS Severn and 16-gun sloop HMS Scorpion on 26 April as escorts for a large convoy. Amazon would only accompany the convoy to "a certain latitude." On 15 June, Amazon captured the French letter of marque Julie at 32°30′N 16°30′W, as the latter attempted to sail from Bordeaux to Cayenne. In November 1827 head money was paid for twenty-one men. (Note: A first-class share was worth £24 18s 6d; a fifth-class share, that of a seaman, was worth 1s 5¼d.) Amazon also recaptured the merchantman Amelia, Donaldson, late master, which the French privateer Minerve had captured. Amazon sent Amelia into Plymouth, which she reached in early July.

Riou and Amazon were then assigned to Admiral Sir Hyde Parker's expedition to the Baltic in 1801, to compel the Danes to abandon the League of Armed Neutrality. Riou worked closely with Parker's second-in-command, Rear-Admiral Horatio Nelson, and Captain Thomas Foley in the lead-up to the Battle of Copenhagen, and Nelson appointed Riou commander of the frigates and smaller vessels, instructing him to deploy his ships in support of the main fleet. As the battle began on 2 April, several of Nelson's ships of the line ran aground on shoals in the harbour, forcing the improvisation of a new plan of attack. As Nelson's ships engaged their Danish counterparts, Riou took his frigates in to harass the Trekroner Fort and blockships. Although the frigates were heavily outmatched and dangerously exposed, they maintained the engagement for several hours. The ships suffered heavy casualties, and a splinter hit Riou on the head.

At 1:15 p.m., Parker was waiting outside the harbour with the reserve and raised a signal ordering Nelson to withdraw. Nelson acknowledged the signal but ignored it, while Nelson's second in command, Rear-Admiral Thomas Graves, repeated the signal but too did not obey it. Riou now found himself in a difficult position. Too junior an officer to risk disobeying a direct order, he gave the order for his small squadron to withdraw.

Withdrawing forced Riou's ships to turn their sterns to the Danish guns, thereby exposing their most vulnerable area. When the 32-gun frigate HMS Alcmene and then the 36-gun frigate HMS Blanche withdrew, this reduced the thick cloud of gunsmoke that was helping to obscure the British ships and left Amazon exposed to the full force of the Danish guns. Lieutenant-Colonel William Stuart, commanding the soldiers of the 48th Regiment of Foot, recorded that Riou was killed:

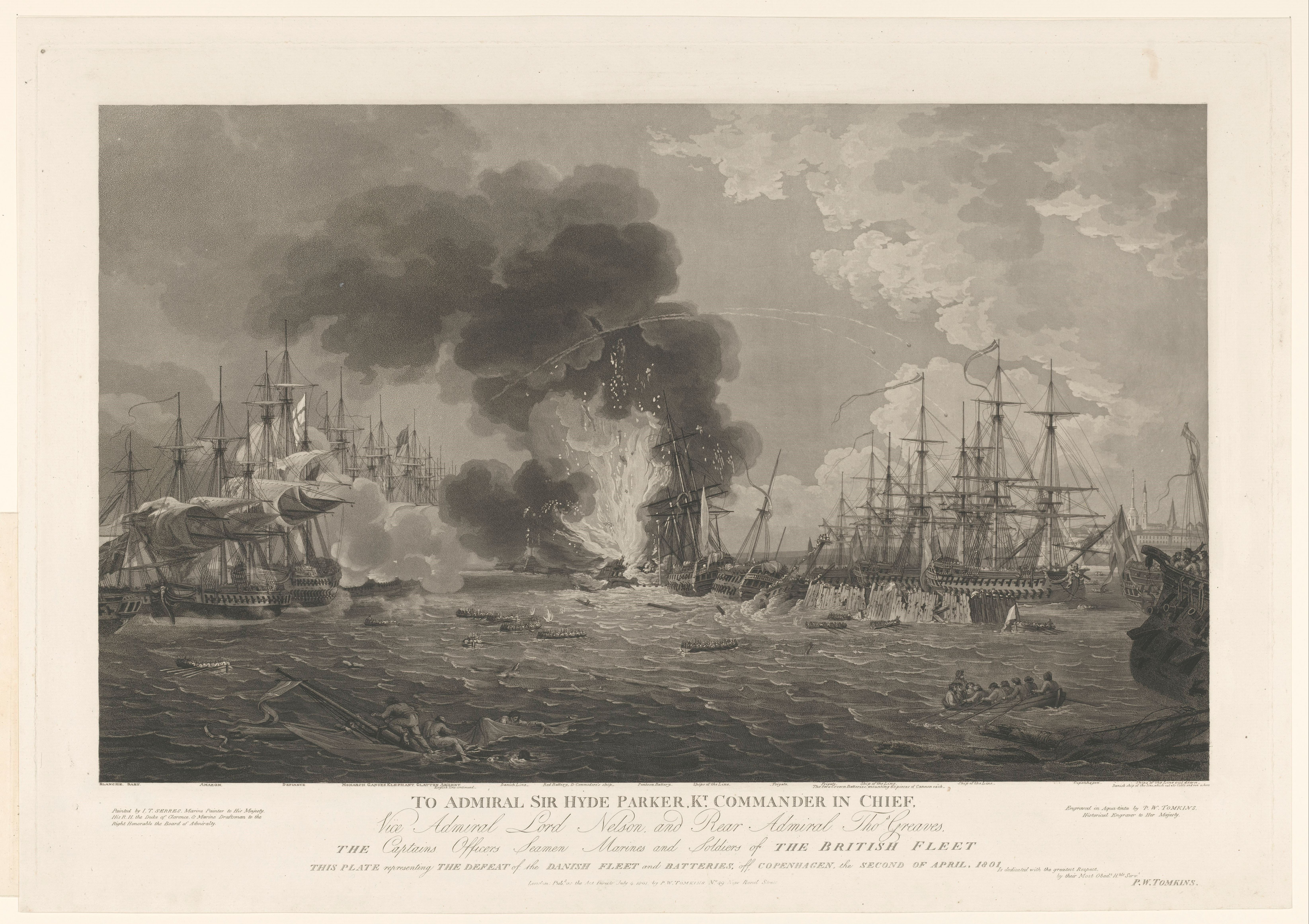
Amazon at Copenhagen, 1801

[He] was sitting on a gun, was encouraging his men, and had been wounded in the head by a splinter. He had expressed himself grieved at being thus obliged to retreat, and nobly observed, 'What will Nelson think of us?' His clerk was killed by his side; and by another shot, several marines, while hauling on the main-brace, shared the same fate. Riou then exclaimed, 'Come, then, my boys, let us all die together!' The words were scarcely uttered, when the fatal shot severed him in two.

Command of Amazon devolved to her first lieutenant, John Quilliam, who completed the withdrawal. Nelson went aboard the badly damaged Amazon after the battle and asked Quilliam how he was doing. Quilliam replied 'Middlin', a response that apparently amused Nelson and may have contributed to Nelson's subsequent appointment of Quilliam as first lieutenant aboard HMS Victory. After the battle, command of Amazon passed to Captain Samuel Sutton. On 22 January 1802, the British mercantile sloop Lovell was driven in to Amazon in the North Sea off Deal. Lovell's's crew was rescued. (Note: One press report gives the sloop's name as Lively, and states that she had foundered. However, Lloyd's List reported the vessel's name as Lovell. The report stated that Lovell, Bowden, master, had been sailing from Waterford to London when she ran into Amazon. After her crew had abandoned Lovell, two French vessels from Boulogne were able to tow her into Calais. Lovell, of 68 tons (bm), Lomar, owner, had been launched at Portsmouth in 1800.)

=== With Nelson ===
==== Mediterranean ====
In November Sutton was succeeded by Captain William Parker. Under Parker, Amazon captured the French 16-gun privateer Felix on 26 July 1803. On 24 November, 1803 she was south of Sardinia. She survived a brush with a French fleet off Cape Capet on 2 May 1804. Amazon was subsequently one of the ships that took part in the Trafalgar Campaign, serving with Nelson in the Mediterranean into 1805. On one occasion in December 1804 Nelson ordered Parker to bring a consignment of live bullocks to supply the fleet off Toulon. Amazon was a notably smart ship, and had just been repainted, making it likely that the instruction was not received with much enthusiasm. Parker duly returned with the shipment, prompting Nelson to enquire with gentle humour 'Well, Parker, of course you would not dirty the Amazon for much for anything; have you brought a dozen and a half, or a dozen?' Parker had in fact brought sixty bullocks and thirty sheep, prompting Nelson to promise a reward for his good service.

Parker and Amazon remained with Nelson after the division of the Mediterranean commands left the Spanish coasts under the supervision of Vice-Admiral Sir John Orde. Nelson suspected that Orde was intercepting his despatches and commandeering Nelson's frigates to use himself. Nelson therefore ordered Parker not to stop for any of Orde's ships if this was possible. Parker attempted this but was intercepted by the 24-gun post ship HMS Eurydice. He was able to convince Eurydice's commander, Captain William Hoste, to turn a blind eye. Having delivered his despatches to Lisbon, Parker acted on Nelson's hint that he was not expected back until February and carried out a cruise that netted him several prizes worth a total of £20,000. Orde complained about the 'poaching' taking place on his station, but the prize money went to Parker and Nelson.

==== West Indies and Atlantic ====
Amazon went on to join Nelson in the chase to the West Indies and back of Pierre-Charles Villeneuve's fleet during the Trafalgar Campaign. During the voyage across the Atlantic, Nelson wanted to pass on specific instructions to his captains about how he wished to engage the French, but did not want to lose time by ordering his ships to stop. Instead he gave the plans to Parker, who the naval officer Pulteney Malcolm described as the 'best frigate captain in the service', and Parker sped along the line in Amazon, delivering the instructions so efficiently that the fleet lost 'hardly a yard of ground'. Once more in European waters after the fleet's return, Amazon captured the Spanish privateer Principe de la Paz off Ushant on 17 September 1805. Principe was armed with twenty-four 9-pounder guns and four swivels. Her crew of 160 men were principally French. She had been out five weeks and had captured the packet Prince of Wales from Lisbon, and the letter of marque Lady Nelson, which had been sailing from Virginia to Glasgow. A number of Lady Nelson's crew were aboard Principe, as was a considerable amount of specie.

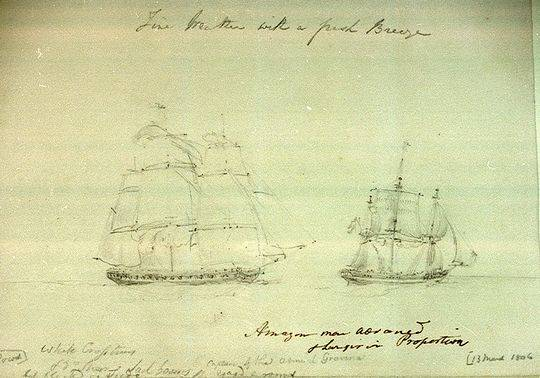
HMS Amazon pursuing an unnamed French vessel, possibly the Belle Poule, sketch by Nicholas Pocock

Amazon was not present for the Battle of Trafalgar on 21 October. The ship was back in the Atlantic in the following year, this time as part of Vice-Admiral Sir John Borlase Warren's pursuit of Jean-Baptiste Philibert Willaumez. When Warren's fleet unexpectedly encountered a separate French fleet under Charles-Alexandre Léon Durand Linois, Amazon became involved in the resulting action of 13 March 1806. During the battle she hunted down and captured the French 40-gun frigate Belle Poule in a running engagement. Amazon lost four killed and five wounded during the engagement, while Belle Poule lost six killed and 24 wounded.

On 28 August 1807 Amazon and the 14-gun cutter HMS Cockatrice were in company at the capture of the Danish ship Speculation and so shared in the prize money for her. Amazon captured the French 14-gun privateer Général Pérignon on 21 January 1810, after a chase of 160 miles. Général Pérignon, of eighty-three men, had left Saint Malo on 8 January and captured the brig Unanimity, from Porto. Parker stated that Général Pérignon's superior sailing had enabled her to cruise successfully against British trade since the commencement of the war. Captain John Joyce succeeded Parker as captain in May, however Parker resumed command in February 1811 and captured the French 14-gun privateer Cupidon on 23 March of the same year. Cupidon, of eighty-two men, was two days out of Bayonne.

== Fate ==
In December 1811 Amazon was laid up at Plymouth. She was paid off the following year and saw out the remainder of the Napoleonic Wars in ordinary. Amazon was finally broken up at Plymouth in May 1817.

== Prizes ==
Vessels captured or destroyed for which Amazon's crew received full or partial credit
Date	Ship	Nationality	Type	Fate	Ref.
14 February 1800	Trelawney	British	Merchant ship	Recaptured	
14 February 1800	Bougainville	French	18-gun privateer	Captured	
15 June 1800	Julie	French	Letter of marque	Captured	
June/July 1800	Amelia	British	Merchant ship	Recaptured	
17 September 1805	Principe de la Paz	Spanish	24-gun privateer	Captured	
13 March 1806	Belle Poule	French	40-gun frigate	Captured	
28 August 1807	Speculation	Danish	Merchant ship	Captured	
21 January 1810	Général Pérignon	French	14-gun privateer	Captured	
23 March 1811	Cupidon	French	14-gun privateer	Captured	
