= HMS Alexandria =

Four ships that served the Royal Navy have borne, or were intended to bear, the name HMS Alexandria, after the city in Egypt:

- HMS Alexandria (1801) was the French frigate Régénérée, captured at Alexandria in 1801, renamed, and then broken up in 1804.
- Alexandria was a tender that served between 1802 and 1803.
- Alexandria (1806) was a fifth-rate frigate launched in 1806 and broken up 1818.
- HMS Alexandria (1943) was a River-class frigate ordered at Montreal in 1943. However, the order was cancelled in December.
