= Nottingham (1787 EIC ship) =

History

Great Britain
- Name: Nottingham
- Owner: EIC voyages #1-6:Timothy Curtis; EIC voyages #7-8:William Borradaile
- Operator: British East India Company
- Ordered: Nottingham
- Builder: William Cleverley, Gravesend
- Launched: 7 March 1787
- Fate: Sold 1810 for breaking up

General characteristics
- Tons burthen: 1151, or 1152, or 11521/94 (bm)
- Length: Overall:159 ft 3 in (48.5 m); Keel:128 ft 2 1/4 in (39.1 m)
- Beam: 41 ft 1 1/4 in (12.5 m)
- Depth of hold: 17 ft 0 in (5.2 m)
- Sail plan: Full-rigged ship
- Complement: 1794:120; 1806:135 men
- Armament: 1794:26 × 9&4-pounder guns; 1806:30 × 12&24-pounder guns
- Notes: Three decks

Nottingham was launched in 1787 as an East Indiaman. She made only eight voyages for the British East India Company (EIC) in the 23 years before she was sold for breaking up.

== Career ==
=== EIC voyage #1 (1787–1788) ===
Captain Archibald Anderson (or Alderson) sailed from the Downs on 10 April 1787, bound for China. Nottingham reached Whampoa anchorage on 16 August. Homeward bound, she crossed the Second Bar on 31 December, reached St Helena on 1 April 1788, and arrived at the Downs on 23 June.

=== EIC voyage #2 (1789–1790) ===
Captain Anderson (or Alderson) sailed from Portsmouth on 27 February 1789, bound for Madras and China. Nottingham reached Madras on 18 June and arrived at Whampoa on 17 September. Homeward bound, she crossed the Second Bar on 3 December, reached St Helena on 14 March 1790, and arrived at the Downs on 23 May.

=== EIC voyage #3 (1792–1793) ===
Captain John Barfoot sailed from the Downs on 2 January 1792, bound for Madras and China. Nottingham reached Madras on 10 May and Penang on 13 July. She arrived at Whampoa on 25 November. Homeward bound, she crossed the Second Bar on 25 November, reached St Helena on 19 March 1793, and arrived at the Downs on 16 June.

The EIC inspected the East Indiamen as they arrived and on 15 October fined Barfoot and eight other captains £100 each for having not stowed their cargoes in conformance with the company's orders. The money was to go to Poplar Hospital. (Note: There was a second announcement, on 30 July 1794 of a fine, but whether this was a restatement or a separate assessment is unclear.)

=== EIC voyage #4 (1794–1795) ===
War with France had commenced as Nottingham was returning home on her third voyage. Captain Barfoot acquired a letter of marque on 3 February 1794. When Nottingham was ready to sail, the British government held her at Portsmouth, together with 38 other Indiamen in anticipation of using them as transports for an attack on Île de France (Mauritius). It gave up the plan and released the vessels in May 1794. It paid £586 13s 4d for having delayed her departure by 22 days.

Barfoot sailed from Portsmouth on 2 May, bound for China. Nottingham reached Whampoa on 14 October. Homeward bound, she crossed the Second Bar on 5 November, reached St Helena on 14 April 1795, and arrived at the Downs on 23 July.

=== EIC voyage #5 (1796–1798) ===
Captain Barfoot sailed from Portsmouth 12 Apr 1796, bound for Madras and China. Nottingham was at the Cape of Good Hope on 22 July and reached Bombay on 19 December. She then sailed down to Tellichery, arriving on 19 January 1797, and reaching Colombo on 1 February, before returning to Bombay on 14 April. Bound for China, she was at Madras on 11 August, Penang on 6 September, and Malacca on 12 October, before she arrived at Whampoa on 23 December. Homeward bound, she crossed the Second Bar on 2 March 1798, reached St Helena on 6 August, and arrived at the Downs on 18 October.

=== EIC voyage #6 (1801–1802) ===
Captain Barfoot sailed from Portsmouth on 9 January 1801, bound for Bombay and China. Nottingham reached Bombay on 26 May and Malacca on 4 September, and arrived at Whampoa on 7 October. Homeward bound she was at 'Lankeet Flat' on 20 January 1802, reached St Helena on 12 April, and arrived at Northfleet on 26 June.

It is not clear what Nottingham did between 1802 and 1807. She may simply have remained at her moorings.

=== EIC voyage #7 (1807–1808) ===
Captain Walter Campbell acquired a letter of marque on 6 December 1806. He sailed from Portsmouth on 26 February 1807, bound for Bombay and China. Nottingham arrived back at her moorings on 1 July 1808.

=== EIC voyage #8 (1809–1810) ===
Captain Campbell sailed from Portsmouth on 24 February 1809, bound for Madras and China. Nottingham was at Madeira on 8 March and Madras on 5 July. She reached Penang on 18 August and Malacca on 30 August, and arrived at Whampoa on 3 November. Homeward bound, she crossed the Second Bar on 21 December and arrived at Long Reach on 1 August 1810.

== Fate ==
On her return Nottingham was sold for breaking up after a survey showed that she was not worth repairing.
