= Henry Ashworth (Royal Navy officer) =

British Navy officer (1785–1811)

Lieutenant Henry Ashworth
- Born: December 1785; London
- Died: 25 July 1811 (aged 25); Minorca
- Military career
- Allegiance: United Kingdom
- Branch: Royal Navy
- Service years: 1799–1811
- Conflicts: French Revolutionary War; Napoleonic Wars; Siege of Tarragona (DOW)

Henry Ashworth (1785–1811) was a British lieutenant in the Royal Navy.

== Early life ==
Ashworth was born in London in December 1785.

== Career ==
In November 1799, he entered on board the 38-gun frigate HMS Hussar, under the immediate patronage of the first lieutenant, and four years later was serving as midshipman on board the same ship when she was lost on Île de Sein, near Brest, on 8 February 1804.

While a prisoner of war, Ashworth made several attempts to escape. He ultimately escaped from Bitche in December 1808, and succeeded in passing through Germany to Trieste, where he went on board the English frigate L'Unité.

In the following October, he was promoted to lieutenant, and was serving in that rank in the 74-gun HMS Centaur on the coast of Spain. When the French took Tarragona on 28 June 1811, and drove a number of the panic-stricken inhabitants into the sea, Ashworth had command of one of the boats sent to rescue the inhabitants.

== Death ==
He received a wound in this action, of which he died a month later on 25 July 1811, at Menorca.
