= Battle of the Nile order of battle =

Description of a 1798 naval battle

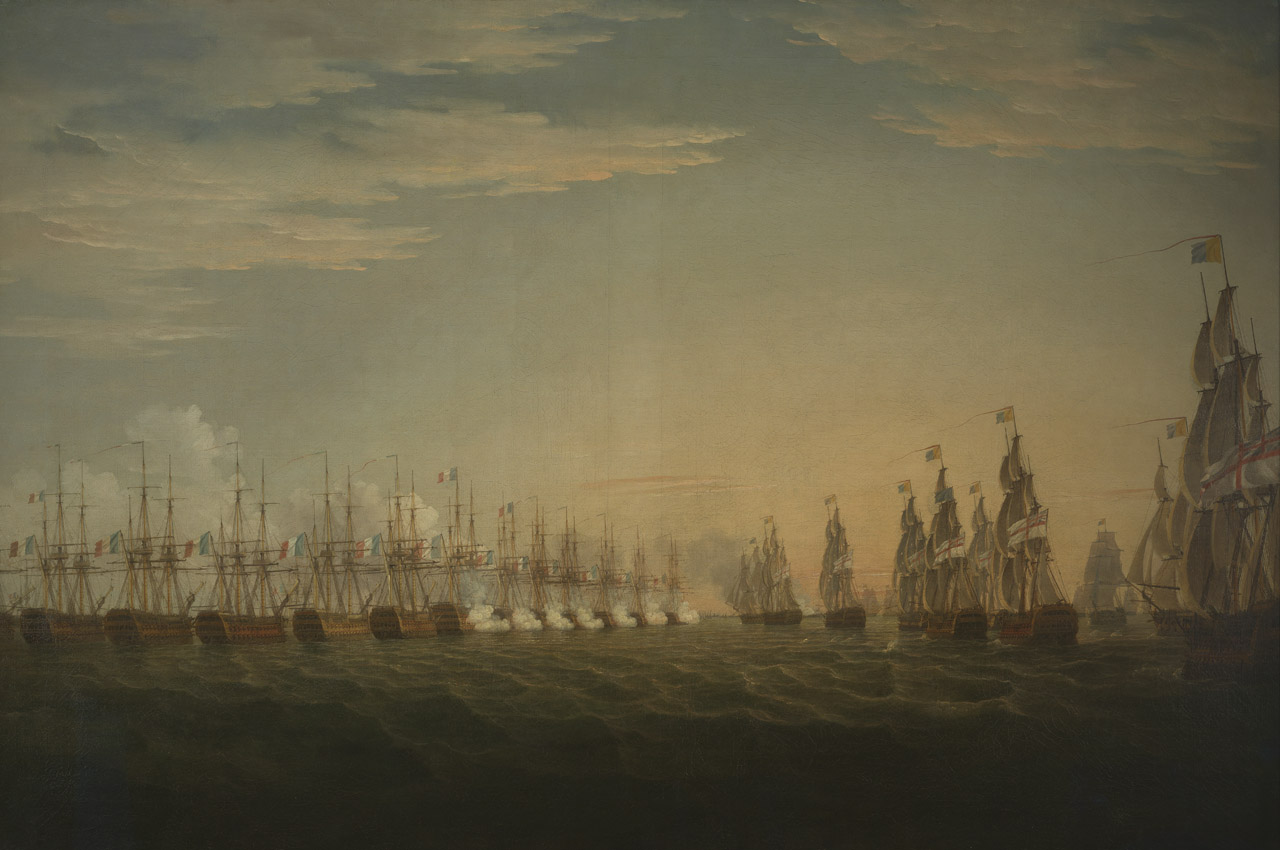
Battle of the Nile, Augt 1st 1798, painted by Thomas Whitcombe in 1816

The Battle of the Nile was a significant naval action fought from 1 to 3 August 1798. The battle took place in Aboukir Bay, near the mouth of the River Nile on the Mediterranean coast of Egypt, and pitted a British fleet of the Royal Navy against a fleet of the French Navy. The battle was the climax of a three-month campaign in the Mediterranean during which a huge French convoy under General Napoleon Bonaparte had sailed from Toulon to Alexandria via Malta. Despite close pursuit by a British fleet of thirteen ships of the line, one fourth rate and a sloop under Sir Horatio Nelson, the French were able to reach Alexandria unscathed and successfully land an army, which Bonaparte led inland. The fleet that had escorted the convoy, consisting of thirteen ships of the line, four frigates and a number of smaller vessels under Vice-Admiral François-Paul Brueys D'Aigalliers, anchored in Aboukir Bay as the harbour of Alexandria was too narrow, forming a line of battle that was protected by shoals to the north and west.

Nelson reached the Egyptian coast on 1 August and discovered the French fleet at 14:00. Advancing during the afternoon, his ships entered the bay at 18:20 and attacked the French directly, despite the rapid approach of nightfall. Taking advantage of a large gap between the lead French ship Guerrier and the northern shoal, HMS Goliath rounded the French line at 18:40 and opened fire from the unprepared port side, followed by five more British ships. The rest of the British line attacked the starboard side of the French van, catching the ships in a fierce crossfire. For three hours the battle continued as the British overwhelmed the first five French ships but were driven away from the heavily defended centre. The arrival of reinforcements allowed a second assault on the centre at 21:00 and at 22:00 the French flagship Orient exploded. Despite Brueys' death, the French centre continued to fight until 03:00, when the badly damaged Tonnant managed to join the thus far unengaged French rear division. At 06:00 firing began again as the less damaged ships of the British fleet attacked the French rear, forcing Counter-Admiral Pierre-Charles Villeneuve to pull away for the mouth of the bay. Four French ships were too badly damaged to join him and were beached by their crews, two subsequently surrendered. Villeneuve eventually escaped to open water with just two ships of the line and two frigates. On 3 August the last two remaining French ships stranded in the bay were defeated, one surrendering and the other deliberately set on fire by its crew.

The almost total destruction of the French fleet reversed the strategic situation in the Mediterranean, giving the Royal Navy control of the sea which it retained until the end of the Napoleonic Wars in 1815. Nelson and his captains were highly praised and generously rewarded, although Nelson privately complained that his peerage was not senior enough. Bonaparte's army was trapped in the Middle East and Royal Navy dominance played a significant part in its subsequent defeat at the Siege of Acre; Bonaparte himself abandoned the army late in 1799 to return to France and deal with the outbreak of the War of the Second Coalition. Of the captured ships, three were no longer serviceable and were burnt in the bay, and three others were judged fit only for harbour duties owing to the damage they had received in the battle. The remainder enjoyed long and successful service careers in the Royal Navy; two subsequently served at the Battle of Trafalgar in 1805.

== Orders of battle ==
The ships in the orders of battle below are listed in the order in which they appeared in the respective battle lines. Listed in the casualties section are the totals of killed and wounded as best as can be established: due to the nature of the battle, French losses were hard to calculate precisely. Officers killed in action are marked with a † symbol. Note that as carronades were not traditionally taken into consideration when calculating a ship's rate, these ships may have been carrying more guns than indicated below.

- Ships in this colour were captured during the battle
- Ships in this colour were destroyed during the battle

=== British fleet ===
Rear-Admiral Nelson's fleet
| Ship | Rate | Guns | Commander | Casualties | | | Notes |
| Ship | Rate | Guns | Commander | Killed | Wounded | Total | Notes |
|---|---|---|---|---|---|---|---|
| HMS Goliath | Third rate | 74 | Captain Thomas Foley | 21 | 41 | 62 | Masts and hull severely damaged |
| HMS Zealous | Third rate | 74 | Captain Samuel Hood | 1 | 7 | 8 | Lightly damaged |
| HMS Orion | Third rate | 74 | Captain Sir James Saumarez | 13 | 29 | 42 | Lightly damaged |
| HMS Audacious | Third rate | 74 | Captain Davidge Gould | 1 | 35 | 36 | Lightly damaged |
| HMS Theseus | Third rate | 74 | Captain Ralph Willett Miller | 5 | 30 | 35 | Hull severely damaged |
| HMS Vanguard | Third rate | 74 | Rear Admiral Sir Horatio Nelson; Captain Edward Berry | 30 | 76 | 106 | Masts and hull severely damaged |
| HMS Minotaur | Third rate | 74 | Captain Thomas Louis | 23 | 64 | 87 | Lightly damaged |
| HMS Defence | Third rate | 74 | Captain John Peyton | 4 | 11 | 15 | Masts lightly damaged |
| HMS Bellerophon | Third rate | 74 | Captain Henry Darby | 49 | 148 | 197 | Dismasted and severely damaged |
| HMS Majestic | Third rate | 74 | Captain George Blagden Westcott † | 50 | 143 | 193 | Lost mainmast and mizzenmast, hull severely damaged |
| HMS Leander | Fourth rate | 50 | Captain Thomas Thompson | 0 | 14 | 14 | Lightly damaged |
| HMS Alexander | Third rate | 74 | Captain Alexander Ball | 14 | 58 | 72 | Masts severely damaged |
| HMS Swiftsure | Third rate | 74 | Captain Benjamin Hallowell | 7 | 22 | 29 | Severely damaged |
| HMS Culloden | Third rate | 74 | Captain Thomas Troubridge | 0 | 0 | 0 | Grounded on the Aboukir shoal during the attack and took no part in the action. Hull severely damaged. |
| HMS Mutine | Sloop-of-war | 16 | Commander Thomas Hardy | 0 | 0 | 0 | Assisted Culloden during the battle and took no part in the fighting |
Total casualties: 218 killed, 678 wounded, 896 total (Note: Sources often give casualty figures for the battle that vary significantly: Adkins list British losses as 218 killed and 677 wounded, French as 5,235 killed or missing and 3,305 captured including approximately 1,000 wounded men. William Laird Clowes gives precise figures for each British ship, totalling 218 killed and 678 wounded, and quotes French casualty estimates of 2,000 to 5,000, settling on the median average of 3,500. Juan Cole gives 218 British dead and French losses of approximately 1,700 dead, a thousand wounded and 3,305 prisoners, most of whom were returned to Alexandria. Robert Gardiner gives British losses as 218 killed and 617 wounded, French as 1,600 killed and 1,500 wounded. William James gives a precise breakdown of British casualties that totals 218 killed and 678 wounded and also quotes estimates of French losses of 2,000 to 5,000, favouring the lower estimate. John Keegan gives British losses as 208 killed and 677 wounded and French as several thousand dead and 1,000 wounded. Steven Maffeo vaguely records 3,000 French casualties and 1,000 British. Noel Mostert gives British losses of 218 killed and 678 wounded and quotes estimates of French losses between 2,000 and 5,000. Peter Padfield gives British losses of 218 killed and 677 wounded and French as 1,700 killed and approximately 850 wounded. Digby Smith lists British losses of 218 killed and 678 wounded and French as 2,000 killed, 1,100 wounded and 3,900 captured. Oliver Warner gives figures of 5,265 French killed or missing, 3,105 taken prisoner and British losses of 218 killed and 677 wounded. Almost all of the French prisoners were returned to French-held territory in Egypt during the week following the battle.)
Sources: James, Vol. 2, pp. 152–175, Clowes, p. 357.

=== French fleet ===
Vice-Admiral Brueys' fleet
Line of battle
| Ship | Rate | Guns | Commander | Casualties | | | Notes |
| Ship | Rate | Guns | Commander | Killed | Wounded | Total | Notes |
|---|---|---|---|---|---|---|---|
| Guerrier | Third rate | 74 | Captain Jean-François-Timothée Trullet | ~350–400 casualties | | | Dismasted and severely damaged. Captured but later destroyed as unserviceable. |
| Conquérant | Third rate | 74 | Captain Etienne Dalbarade † | ~350 casualties | | | Dismasted and severely damaged. Captured and became HMS Conquerant but never saw front line service. |
| Spartiate | Third rate | 74 | Captain Maurice-Julien Emeriau | 64 | 150 | 214 | Dismasted and severely damaged. Captured and became HMS Spartiate. |
| Aquilon | Third rate | 74 | Captain Antoine René Thévenard † | 87 | 213 | 300 | Dismasted and severely damaged. Captured and became HMS Aboukir but never saw front line service. |
| Peuple Souverain | Third rate | 74 | Captain Pierre-Paul Raccord | Heavy casualties | | | Fore and main masts collapsed and hull severely damaged. Captured and became HMS Guerrier but never saw front line service. |
| Franklin | Third rate | 80 | Counter-Admiral Armand Blanquet; Captain Maurice Gillet | ~400 casualties | | | Mainmast and mizzenmast collapsed and hull severely damaged. Captured and became HMS Canopus. |
| Orient | First rate | 120 | Vice-Admiral François-Paul Brueys d'Aigalliers †; Counter-Admiral Honoré Ganteaume; Captain Luc-Julien-Joseph Casabianca † | ~1,000 casualties | | | Destroyed in an ammunition explosion |
| Tonnant | Third rate | 80 | Commodore Aristide Aubert Du Petit Thouars † | Heavy casualties | | | Dismasted, grounded and severely damaged. Captured on 3 August and became HMS Tonnant. |
| Heureux | Third rate | 74 | Captain Jean-Pierre Etienne | Light casualties | | | Grounded and severely damaged. Captured on 2 August but later burnt as unserviceable. |
| Mercure | Third rate | 74 | Lieutenant Pierre-Philippe Cambon | Light casualties | | | Grounded and severely damaged. Captured on 2 August but later burnt as unserviceable. |
| Guillaume Tell | Third rate | 80 | Counter-Admiral Pierre-Charles Villeneuve; Captain Saulnier | Light casualties | | | Escaped on 2 August |
| Généreux | Third rate | 74 | Captain Louis-Jean-Nicolas Lejoille | Light casualties | | | Escaped with Guillaume Tell on 2 August |
| Timoléon | Third rate | 74 | Captain Louis-Léonce Trullet | Light casualties | | | Grounded and severely damaged. Scuttled by its crew on 3 August. |
Frigates
| Sérieuse | Fifth rate | 36 | Captain Claude-Jean Martin | Heavy casualties | | | Sank due to damage received in the battle |
| Artémise | Fifth rate | 36 | Captain Pierre-Jean Standelet | Light casualties | | | Scuttled by its crew on 2 August |
| Justice | Fifth rate | 40 | Captain Jean Villeneuve | 0 | 0 | 0 | Escaped with Guillaume Tell on 2 August |
| Diane | Fifth rate | 40 | Counter-Admiral Denis Decrès; Captain Éléonore-Jean-Nicolas Soleil | 0 | 0 | 0 | Escaped with Guillaume Tell on 2 August |
The head of the French line was supported by guns mounted on Aboukir Island and a number of gunboats and bomb vessels situated among the shoals to the west of the line. These participated in the battle but with little effect, and several grounded during the engagement, with one bomb vessel scuttled by its crew.
Total casualties: ~3,000–5,000
Sources: James, Vol. 2, pp. 152–175, Clowes, p. 357.

== Bibliography ==
- Adkins, Roy & Lesley (2006). The War for All the Oceans. Abacus. ISBN 0-349-11916-3.
- Clowes, William Laird (1997) [1900]. The Royal Navy, A History from the Earliest Times to 1900, Volume IV. Chatham Publishing. ISBN 1-86176-013-2.
- Cole, Juan (2007). Napoleon's Egypt; Invading the Middle East. Palgrave Macmillan. ISBN 978-1-4039-6431-1.
- Gardiner, Robert, ed. (2001) [1996]. Nelson Against Napoleon. Caxton Editions. ISBN 1-86176-026-4.
- Germani, Ian (January 2000). "Combat and Culture: Imagining the Battle of the Nile". The Northern Mariner. X (1): 53–72. doi:10.25071/2561-5467.610.
- James, William (2002) [1827]. The Naval History of Great Britain, Volume 1, 1793–1796. Conway Maritime Press. ISBN 0-85177-905-0.
- James, William (2002) [1827]. The Naval History of Great Britain, Volume 2, 1797–1799. Conway Maritime Press. ISBN 0-85177-906-9.
- Jordan, Gerald; Rogers, Nicholas (July 1989). "Admirals as Heroes: Patriotism and Liberty in Hanoverian England". The Journal of British Studies. 28 (3): 201–224. doi:10.1086/385935.
- Keegan, John (2003). Intelligence in War: Knowledge of the Enemy from Napoleon to Al-Qaeda. Pimlico. ISBN 0-7126-6650-8.
- Maffeo, Steven E. (2000). Most Secret and Confidential: Intelligence in the Age of Nelson. London: Chatham Publishing. ISBN 1-86176-152-X.
- Mostert, Noel (2007). The Line upon a Wind: The Greatest War Fought at Sea Under Sail 1793–1815. Vintage Books. ISBN 978-0-7126-0927-2.
- Padfield, Peter (2000) [1976]. Nelson's War. Wordsworth Military Library. ISBN 1-84022-225-5.
- Rodger, N.A.M. (2004). The Command of the Ocean. Allan Lane. ISBN 0-7139-9411-8.
- Rose, J. Holland (1924). "Napoleon and Sea Power". Cambridge Historical Journal. 1 (2): 138–157. doi:10.1017/S1474691300000925.
- Smith, Digby (1998). The Napoleonic Wars Data Book. Greenhill Books. ISBN 1-85367-276-9.
- Warner, Oliver (1960). The Battle of the Nile. London: B. T. Batsford.
