= Operation Binnacle =

British war plan

- Type: Planned military intervention
- Location: Kenya
- Planned by: United Kingdom

Operation Binnacle was a British war plan for military intervention in the event of a 1965 coup d'état in Kenya.

The plan has been cited as evidence of the strong diplomatic ties between then President Kenyatta and the United Kingdom.

== Bibliography ==
- Cullen, Poppy (20 October 2017). "Operation Binnacle: British plans for military intervention against a 1965 coup in Kenya". The International History Review. 39 (5). Routledge: 791–809. doi:10.1080/07075332.2016.1261917. eISSN 1949-6540. ISSN 0707-5332. This article incorporates text from this source, which is available under the CC BY 4.0 license.
