= Edward Ingram =

Edward Ingram may refer to:

- Eddie Ingram (1910–1973), Irish cricketer
- Maurice Ingram (Edward Maurice Berkeley Ingram, 1890–1941), British diplomat and civil servant
- Edward Ingram (historian) (born 1940), Anglo-Canadian historian

== See also ==
- Ed Ingram (born 1999), American football player
