= Battle of the Nile =

1798 battle of the French invasion of Egypt and Syria

- Part of the Egyptian and Mediterranean campaigns of the War of the Second Coalition
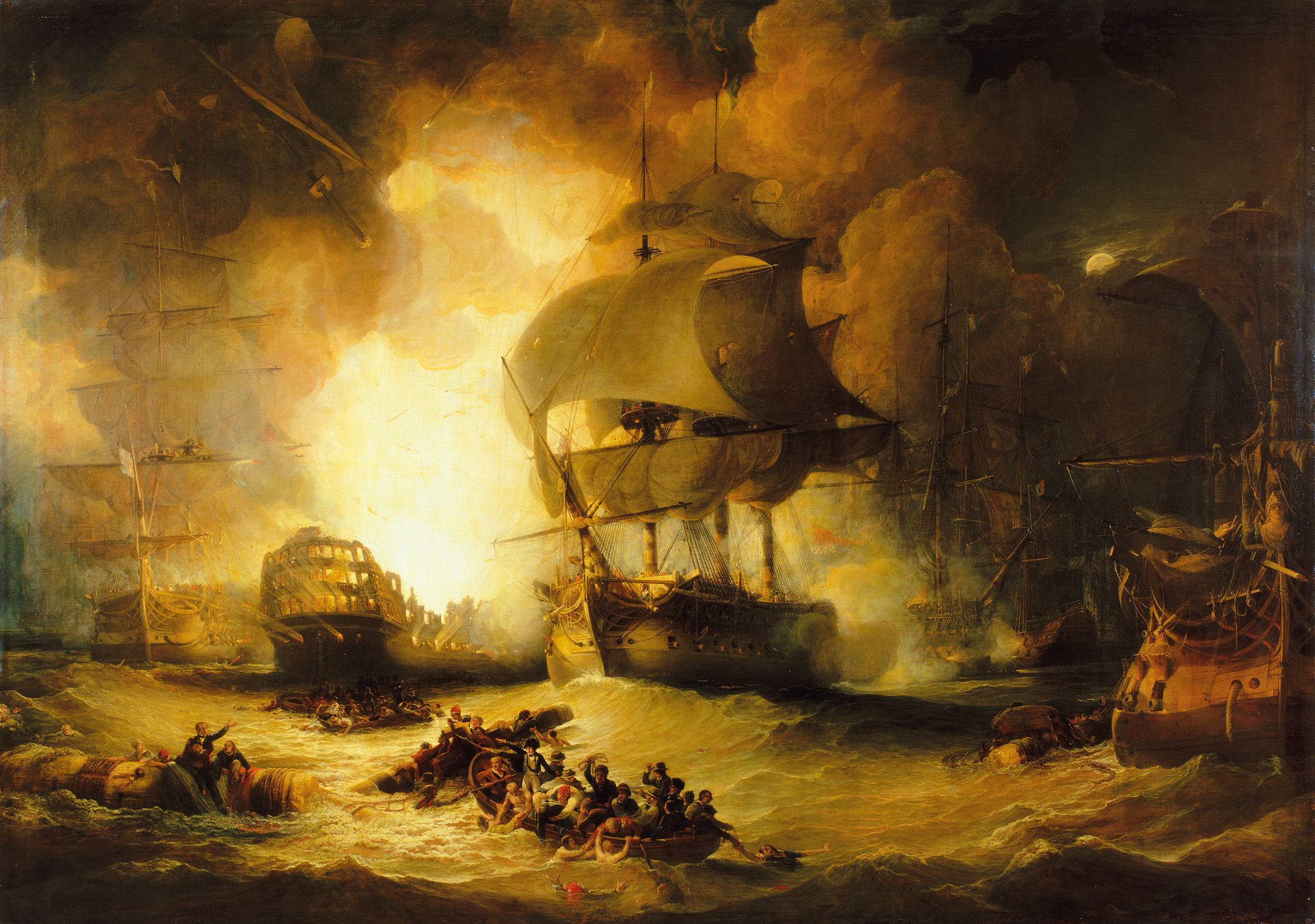
- The Destruction of L'Orient at the Battle of the Nile; George Arnald, 1827
Date	1–3 August 1798
Location	Aboukir Bay, Ottoman Egypt 31°20′N 30°07′E
Result	British victory

Belligerents
Great Britain	France

Commanders and leaders
Sir Horatio Nelson (WIA)	Brueys d'Aigalliers †

Strength
14 ships of the line 1 sloop (OOB)	13 ships of the line 4 frigates (OOB)

Casualties and losses
218 killed 677 wounded	2,000–5,000 killed or wounded 3,000–3,900 captured 9 ships of the line captured 1 ship of the line destroyed 1 ship of the line scuttled 1 frigate sunk 1 frigate scuttled
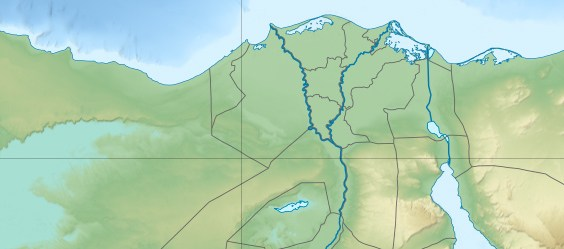
- Location within Lower Egypt Battle of the Nile (Mediterranean)

Egypt and Syria
current battle
Napoleon in command till 23 August 1799

The Battle of the Nile (also known as the Battle of Aboukir Bay; French: Bataille d'Aboukir) was fought between the Royal Navy and the French Navy at Aboukir Bay in Egypt between 1 and 3 August 1798. It was the climax of the Mediterranean campaign of 1798, which had started three months earlier after a large French fleet sailed from Toulon to Alexandria carrying an expeditionary force under Napoleon. A British fleet, led by Rear-Admiral of the Blue Sir Horatio Nelson, decisively defeated a French fleet under Vice-admiral François-Paul Brueys d'Aigalliers, which had escorted Napoleon's army to Egypt.

Napoleon sought to invade Egypt as the first step in a campaign against British India, as part of a greater effort to drive Britain out of the French Revolutionary Wars. As Napoleon's expeditionary force crossed the Mediterranean, it was pursued by a British fleet under Nelson who had been sent from a larger fleet in the Tagus to learn the purpose of the French expedition and to defeat it. He chased the French for more than two months, on several occasions missing them only by a matter of hours. Napoleon was aware of Nelson's pursuit and enforced absolute secrecy about his destination. He was able to capture Malta and then land in Egypt without being intercepted by the British navy.

With the French army ashore, Brueys' fleet anchored in Aboukir Bay, 20 miles (32 km) northeast of Alexandria. Brueys believed that he had established a formidable defensive position. The British fleet arrived off Egypt on 1 August and discovered Brueys' dispositions, and Nelson ordered an immediate attack. Brueys had not organized reconnaissance when he learned of the proximity of the British fleet, because the crews from scout ships were forced to work on shore to find provisions, so Nelson's attack came as a surprise to the French. Brueys also noted the poor condition of his crews and rigging. Nelson's ships advanced on the French line and split into two divisions as they approached. One cut across the head of the line and passed between the anchored French and the shore, while the other engaged the seaward side of the French fleet. Trapped in a crossfire, the leading French warships were battered into surrender during a fierce three-hour battle, although the centre of the line held out for a while until more British ships were able to join the attack. At 22:00, the French flagship Orient exploded which prompted the rear division of the French fleet to attempt to break out of the bay. With Brueys dead and his vanguard and centre defeated, only two French ships of the line and two frigates escaped from a total of 17 ships engaged.

The battle reversed the strategic situation between the two nations' forces in the Mediterranean and entrenched the Royal Navy in the dominant position that it retained for the rest of the Napoleonic Wars. It also encouraged other European countries to turn against France, and was a factor in the outbreak of the War of the Second Coalition. Napoleon's army was trapped in Egypt, and Royal Navy dominance off the Syrian coast contributed significantly to the French defeat at the siege of Acre in 1799 which preceded Napoleon's abandonment of Egypt and return to Europe. Nelson was wounded in the battle, and he was proclaimed a hero across Europe and was subsequently made Baron Nelson—although he was privately dissatisfied with his rewards. His captains were also highly praised and went on to form the nucleus of the legendary Nelson's band of brothers. The legend of the battle has remained prominent in the popular consciousness, with perhaps the best-known representation being Felicia Hemans' 1826 poem Casabianca.

== Background ==
Napoleon Bonaparte's victories in northern Italy over the Austrian Empire helped secure victory for the French in the War of the First Coalition in 1797, and Great Britain remained the only major European power still at war with the French Republic. The French Directory investigated a number of strategic options to counter British opposition, including projected invasions of Ireland and Britain and the expansion of the French Navy to challenge the Royal Navy at sea. Despite significant efforts, British control of Northern European waters rendered these ambitions impractical in the short term, and the Royal Navy remained firmly in control of the Atlantic Ocean. However, the French navy was dominant in the Mediterranean, following the withdrawal of the British fleet after the outbreak of war between Britain and Spain in 1796. This allowed Bonaparte to propose an invasion of Egypt as an alternative to confronting Britain directly, believing that the British would be too distracted by an imminent Irish uprising to intervene in the Mediterranean.

Bonaparte believed that, by establishing a permanent presence in Egypt (nominally part of the neutral Ottoman Empire), the French would obtain a staging point for future operations against British India, possibly by means of an alliance with the Tipu Sultan of Seringapatam, that might successfully drive the British out of the war. The campaign would sever the chain of communication that connected Britain with India, an essential part of the British Empire whose trade generated the wealth that Britain required to prosecute the war successfully. The French Directory agreed with Bonaparte's plans, although a major factor in their decision was a desire to see the politically ambitious Bonaparte and the fiercely loyal veterans of his Italian campaigns travel as far from France as possible. During the spring of 1798, Bonaparte assembled more than 35,000 soldiers in Mediterranean France and Italy and developed a powerful fleet at Toulon. He also formed the Commission des Sciences et des Arts, a body of scientists and engineers intended to establish a French colony in Egypt. Napoleon kept the destination of the expedition top secret—most of the army's officers did not know of its target, and Bonaparte did not publicly reveal his goal until the first stage of the expedition was complete.

=== Mediterranean campaign ===
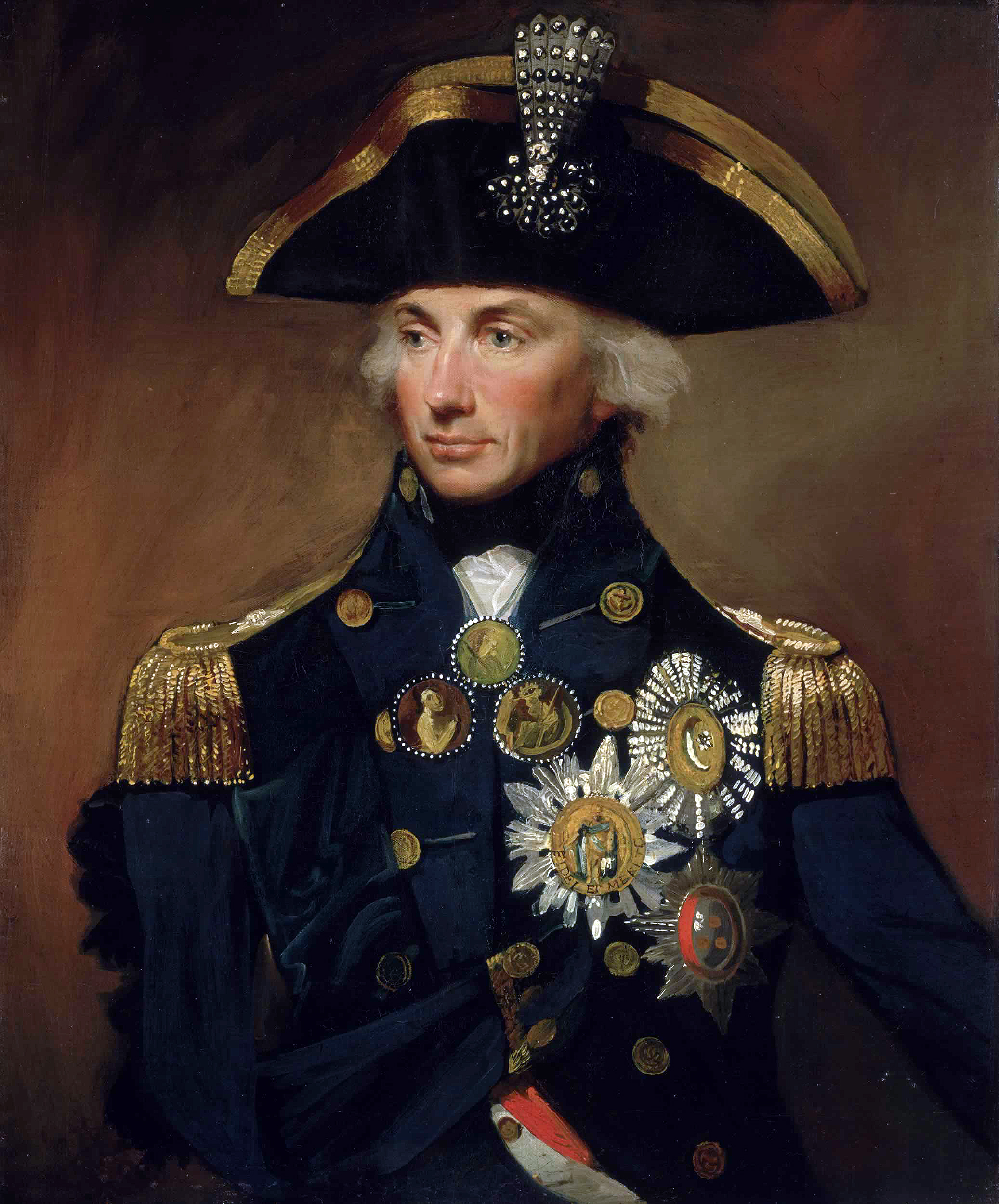
Rear-Admiral Sir Horatio Nelson, Lemuel Francis Abbott, 1800, National Maritime Museum. Visible on his cocked hat is the aigrette presented by the Ottoman Sultan as a reward for the victory at the Nile

Bonaparte's armada sailed from Toulon on 19 May, making rapid progress through the Ligurian Sea and collecting more ships at Genoa, before sailing southwards along the Sardinian coast and passing Sicily on 7 June. On 9 June, the fleet arrived off Malta, then under the ownership of the Knights of St. John of Jerusalem, ruled by Grand Master Ferdinand von Hompesch zu Bolheim. Bonaparte demanded that his fleet be permitted entry to the fortified harbour of Valletta. When the Knights refused, the French general responded by ordering a large scale invasion of the Maltese Islands, overrunning the defenders after 24 hours of skirmishing. The Knights formally surrendered on 12 June and, in exchange for substantial financial compensation, handed the islands and all of their resources over to Bonaparte, including the extensive property of the Roman Catholic Church on Malta. Within a week, Bonaparte had resupplied his ships, and on 19 June, his fleet departed for Alexandria in the direction of Crete, leaving 4,000 men at Valletta under General Claude-Henri Vaubois to ensure French control of the islands.

While Bonaparte was sailing to Malta, the Royal Navy re-entered the Mediterranean for the first time in more than a year. Alarmed by reports of French preparations on the Mediterranean coast, Lord Spencer at the Admiralty sent a message to Vice-Admiral Earl St. Vincent, commander of the Mediterranean Fleet based in the Tagus, to despatch a squadron to investigate. This squadron, consisting of three ships of the line and three frigates, was entrusted to Rear-Admiral of the Blue Sir Horatio Nelson.

Nelson was a highly experienced officer who had been blinded in one eye during fighting in Corsica in 1794 and subsequently commended for his capture of two Spanish ships of the line at the Battle of Cape St. Vincent in February 1797. In July 1797, he lost an arm at the Battle of Santa Cruz de Tenerife and had been forced to return to Britain to recuperate. Returning to the fleet at the Tagus in late April 1798, he was ordered to collect the squadron stationed at Gibraltar and sail for the Ligurian Sea. On 21 May, as Nelson's squadron approached Toulon, it was struck by a fierce gale and Nelson's flagship, HMS Vanguard, lost its topmasts and was almost wrecked on the Corsican coast. The remainder of the squadron was scattered. The ships of the line sheltered at San Pietro Island off Sardinia; the frigates were blown to the west and failed to return.

On 7 June, following hasty repairs to his flagship, a fleet consisting of ten ships of the line and a fourth-rate joined Nelson off Toulon. The fleet, under the command of Captain Thomas Troubridge, had been sent by Earl St. Vincent to reinforce Nelson, with orders that he was to pursue and intercept the Toulon convoy. Although he now had enough ships to challenge the French fleet, Nelson suffered two great disadvantages: He had no intelligence regarding the destination of the French, and no frigates to scout ahead of his force. Striking southwards in the hope of collecting information about French movements, Nelson's ships stopped at Elba and Naples, where the British ambassador, Sir William Hamilton, reported that the French fleet had passed Sicily headed in the direction of Malta. Despite pleas from Nelson and Hamilton, King Ferdinand of Naples refused to lend his frigates to the British fleet, fearing French reprisals. On 22 June, a brig sailing from Ragusa brought Nelson the news that the French had sailed eastwards from Malta on 16 June. After conferring with his captains, the admiral decided that the French target must be Egypt and set off in pursuit. Incorrectly believing the French to be five days ahead rather than two, Nelson insisted on a direct route to Alexandria without deviation.

On the evening of 22 June, Nelson's fleet passed the French in the darkness, overtaking the slow invasion convoy without realising how close they were to their target. Making rapid time on a direct route, Nelson reached Alexandria on 28 June and discovered that the French were not there. After a meeting with the suspicious Ottoman commander, Sayyid Muhammad Kurayyim, Nelson ordered the British fleet northwards, reaching the coast of Anatolia on 4 July and turning westwards back towards Sicily. Nelson had missed the French by less than a day—the scouts of the French fleet arrived off Alexandria in the evening of 29 June.

Concerned by his near encounter with Nelson, Bonaparte ordered an immediate invasion, his troops coming ashore in a poorly managed amphibious operation in which at least 20 drowned. Marching along the coast, the French army stormed Alexandria and captured the city, after which Bonaparte led the main force of his army inland. He instructed his naval commander, Vice-Admiral François-Paul Brueys D'Aigalliers, to anchor in Alexandria harbour, but naval surveyors reported that the channel into the harbour was too shallow and narrow for the larger ships of the French fleet. As a result, the French selected an alternative anchorage at Aboukir Bay, 20 miles (32 km) northeast of Alexandria.

Nelson's fleet reached Syracuse in Sicily on 19 July and took on essential supplies. There the admiral wrote letters describing the events of the previous months: "It is an old saying, 'the Devil's children have the Devil's luck.' I cannot find, or at this moment learn, beyond vague conjecture where the French fleet are gone to. All my ill fortune, hitherto, has proceeded from want of frigates." Meanwhile, the French were securing Egypt by the Battle of the Pyramids. By 24 July, the British fleet was resupplied and, having determined that the French must be somewhere in the Eastern Mediterranean, Nelson sailed again in the direction of the Morea. On 28 July, at Coron, Nelson finally obtained intelligence describing the French attack on Egypt and turned south across the Mediterranean. His scouts, HMS Alexander and HMS Swiftsure, sighted the French transport fleet at Alexandria on the afternoon of 1 August.

=== Aboukir Bay ===
When Alexandria harbour had proved inadequate for his fleet, Brueys had gathered his captains and discussed their options. Bonaparte had ordered the fleet to anchor in Aboukir Bay, a shallow and exposed anchorage, but had supplemented the orders with the suggestion that, if Aboukir Bay was too dangerous, Brueys could sail north to Corfu, leaving only the transports and a handful of lighter warships at Alexandria. Brueys refused, in the belief that his squadron could provide essential support to the French army on shore, and called his captains aboard his 120-gun flagship Orient to discuss their response should Nelson discover the fleet in its anchorage. Despite vocal opposition from Counter-admiral Armand Blanquet, who insisted that the fleet would be best able to respond in open water, the rest of the captains agreed that anchoring in a line of battle inside the bay presented the strongest tactic for confronting Nelson. It is possible that Bonaparte envisaged Aboukir Bay as a temporary anchorage: on 27 July, he expressed the expectation that Brueys had already transferred his ships to Alexandria, and three days later, he issued orders for the fleet to make for Corfu in preparation for naval operations against the Ottoman territories in the Balkans, although Bedouin partisans intercepted and killed the courier carrying the instructions.

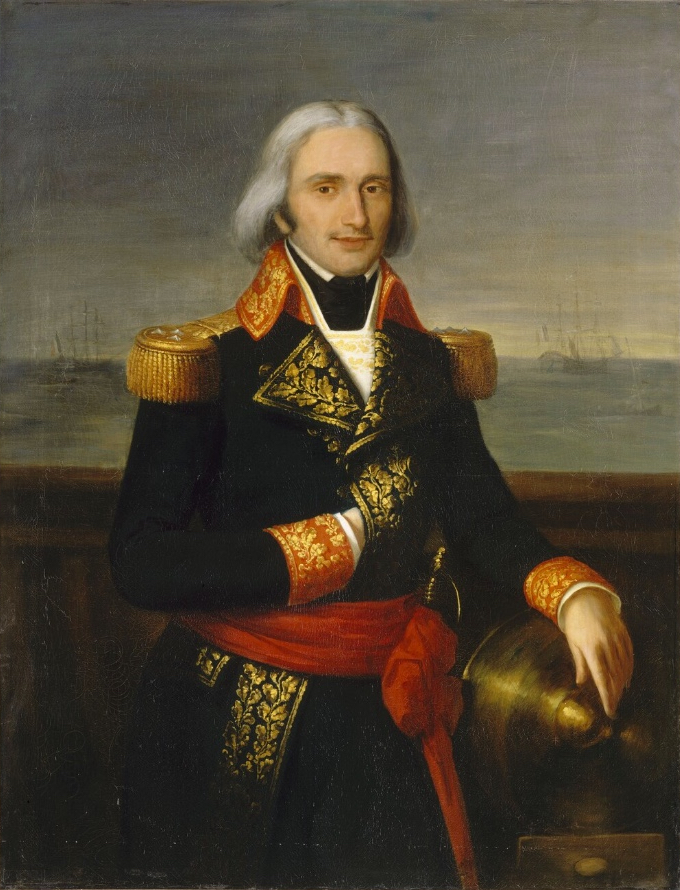
François-Paul Brueys d'Aigalliers artist unknown, Palace of Versailles

Aboukir Bay is a coastal indentation 16 nautical miles (30 km) across, stretching from the village of Abu Qir in the west to the town of Rosetta to the east, where one of the mouths of the River Nile empties into the Mediterranean. In 1798, the bay was protected at its western end by extensive rocky shoals which ran 3 miles (4.8 km) into the bay from a promontory guarded by Aboukir Castle. A small fort situated on an island among the rocks protected the shoals. The fort was garrisoned by French soldiers and armed with at least four cannon and two heavy mortars. Brueys had augmented the fort with his bomb vessels and gunboats, anchored among the rocks to the west of the island in a position to give support to the head of the French line. Further shoals ran unevenly to the south of the island and extended across the bay in a rough semicircle approximately 1,650 yards (1,510 m) from the shore. These shoals were too shallow to permit the passage of larger warships, and so Brueys ordered his thirteen ships of the line to form up in a line of battle following the northeastern edge of the shoals to the south of the island, a position that allowed the ships to disembark supplies from their port sides while covering the landings with their starboard batteries. Orders were issued for each ship to attach strong cables to the bow and stern of their neighbours, which would effectively turn the line into a long battery forming a theoretically impregnable barrier. Brueys positioned a second, inner line of four frigates approximately 350 yards (320 m) west of the main line, roughly halfway between the line and the shoal. The van of the French line was led by Guerrier, positioned 2,400 yards (2,200 m) southeast of Aboukir Island and about 1,000 yards (910 m) from the edge of the shoals that surrounded the island. The line stretched southeast, with the centre bowed seawards away from the shoal. The French ships were spaced at intervals of 160 yards (150 m) and the whole line was 2,850 yards (2,610 m) long, with the flagship Orient at the centre and two large 80-gun ships anchored on either side. The rear division of the line was under the command of Counter-admiral Pierre-Charles Villeneuve in Guillaume Tell.

In deploying his ships in this way, Brueys hoped that the British would be forced by the shoals to attack his strong centre and rear, allowing his van to use the prevailing northeasterly wind to counterattack the British once they were engaged. However, he had made a serious misjudgement: he had left enough room between Guerrier and the shoals for an enemy ship to cut across the head of the French line and proceed between the shoals and the French ships, allowing the unsupported vanguard to be caught in a crossfire by two divisions of enemy ships. Compounding this error, the French only prepared their ships for battle on their starboard (seaward) sides, from which they expected the attack would have to come; their landward port sides were unprepared. The port side gun ports were closed, and the decks on that side were uncleared, with various stored items blocking access to the guns. Brueys' dispositions had a second significant flaw: The 160-yard gaps between ships were large enough for a British ship to push through and break the French line. Furthermore, not all of the French captains had followed Brueys' orders to attach cables to their neighbours' bow and stern, which would have prevented such a manoeuvre. The problem was exacerbated by orders to only anchor at the bow, which allowed the ships to swing with the wind and widened the gaps. It also created areas within the French line not covered by the broadside of any ship. British vessels could anchor in those spaces and engage the French without reply. In addition, the deployment of Brueys' fleet prevented the rear from effectively supporting the van due to the prevailing winds.

A more pressing problem for Brueys was a lack of food and water for the fleet: Bonaparte had unloaded almost all of the provisions carried aboard and no supplies were reaching the ships from the shore. To remedy this, Brueys sent foraging parties of 25 men from each ship along the coast to requisition food, dig wells, and collect water. Constant attacks by Bedouin partisans, however, required escorts of heavily armed guards for each party. Hence, up to a third of the fleet's sailors were away from their ships at any one time. Brueys wrote a letter describing the situation to Minister of Marine Étienne Eustache Bruix, reporting that "Our crews are weak, both in number and quality. Our rigging, in general, out of repair, and I am sure it requires no little courage to undertake the management of a fleet furnished with such tools."

== Battle ==
=== Nelson's arrival ===
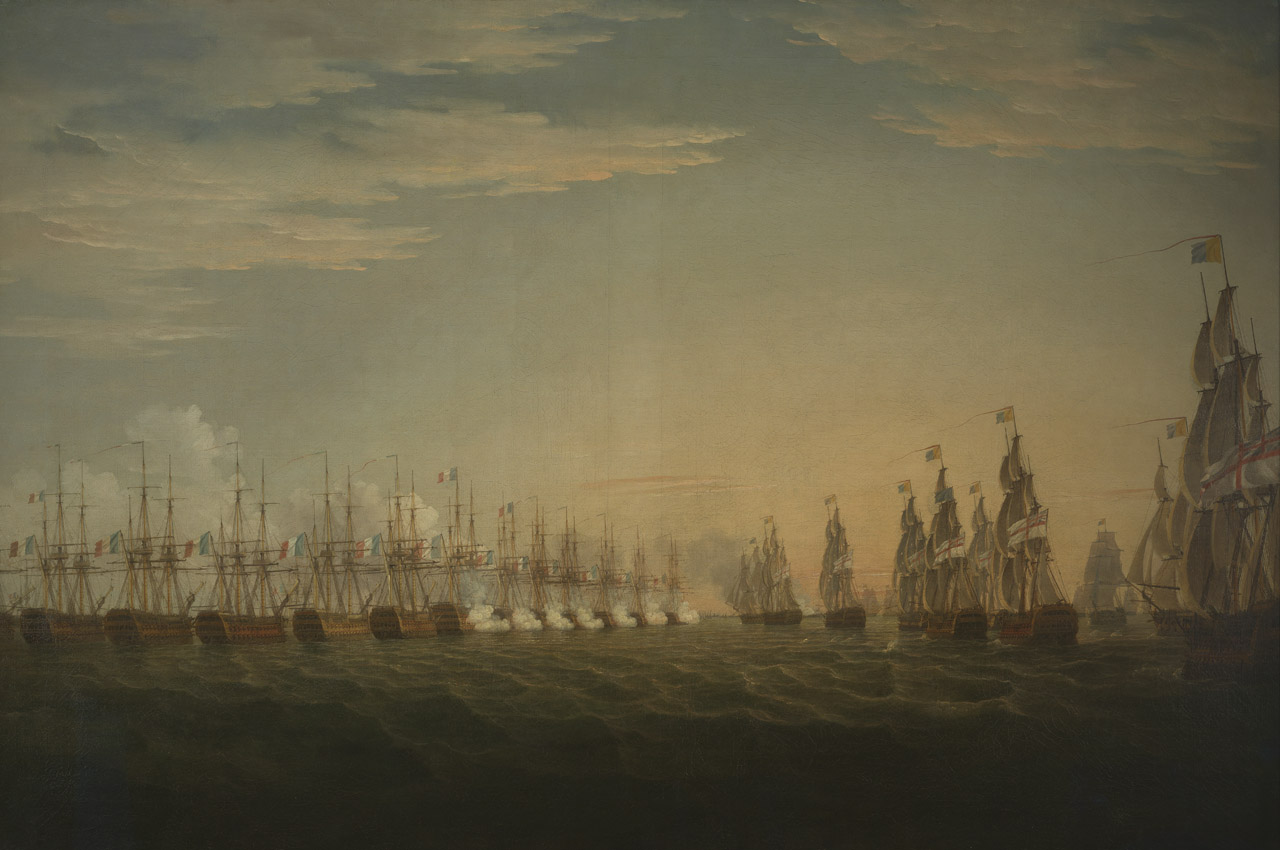
Nelson's fleet bearing down on the French line of battle

Although initially disappointed that the main French fleet was not at Alexandria, Nelson knew from the presence of the transports that they must be nearby. At 14:00 on 1 August, lookouts on HMS Zealous reported the French anchored in Aboukir Bay, its signal lieutenant just beating the lieutenant on HMS Goliath with the signal, but inaccurately describing 16 French ships of the line instead of 13. At the same time, French lookouts on Heureux, the ninth ship in the French line, sighted the British fleet approximately nine nautical miles off the mouth of Aboukir Bay. The French initially reported just 11 British ships – Swiftsure and Alexander were still returning from their scouting operations at Alexandria, and so were 3 nautical miles (5.6 km) to the west of the main fleet, out of sight. Troubridge's ship, HMS Culloden, was also some distance from the main body, towing a captured merchant ship. At the sight of the French, Troubridge abandoned the vessel and made strenuous efforts to rejoin Nelson. Due to the need for so many sailors to work onshore, Brueys had not deployed any of his lighter warships as scouts, which left him unable to react swiftly to the sudden appearance of the British.

As his ships readied for action, Brueys ordered his captains to gather for a conference on Orient and hastily recalled his shore parties, although most had still not returned by the start of the battle. To replace them, large numbers of men were taken out of the frigates and distributed among the ships of the line. Brueys also hoped to lure the British fleet onto the shoals at Aboukir Island, sending the brigs Alerte and Railleur to act as decoys in the shallow waters. By 16:00, Alexander and Swiftsure were also in sight, although some distance from the main British fleet. Brueys gave orders to abandon the plan to remain at anchor and instead for his line to set sail. Blanquet protested the order on the grounds that there were not enough men aboard the French ships to both sail the ships and man the guns. Nelson gave orders for his leading ships to slow down, to allow the British fleet to approach in a more organised formation. This convinced Brueys that rather than risk an evening battle in confined waters, the British were planning to wait for the following day. He rescinded his earlier order to sail. Brueys may have been hoping that the delay would allow him to slip past the British during the night and thus follow Bonaparte's orders not to engage the British fleet directly if he could avoid it.

Nelson ordered the fleet to slow down at 16:00 to allow his ships to rig "springs" on their anchor cables, a system of attaching the bow anchor that increased stability and allowed his ships to swing their broadsides to face an enemy while stationary. It also increased manoeuvrability and therefore reduced the risk of coming under raking fire. Nelson's plan, shaped through discussion with his senior captains during the return voyage to Alexandria, was to advance on the French and pass down the seaward side of the van and centre of the French line, so that each French ship would face two British ships and the massive Orient would be fighting against three. The direction of the wind meant that the French rear division would be unable to join the battle easily and would be cut off from the front portions of the line. To ensure that in the smoke and confusion of a night battle his ships would not accidentally open fire on one another, Nelson ordered that each ship prepare four horizontal lights at the head of their mizzen mast and hoist an illuminated White Ensign, which was different enough from the French tricolour that it would not be mistaken in poor visibility, reducing the risk that British ships might fire on one another in the darkness. As his ship was readied for battle, Nelson held a final dinner with Vanguard's officers, announcing as he rose: "Before this time tomorrow I shall have gained a peerage or Westminster Abbey," in reference to the rewards of victory or the traditional burial place of British military heroes.

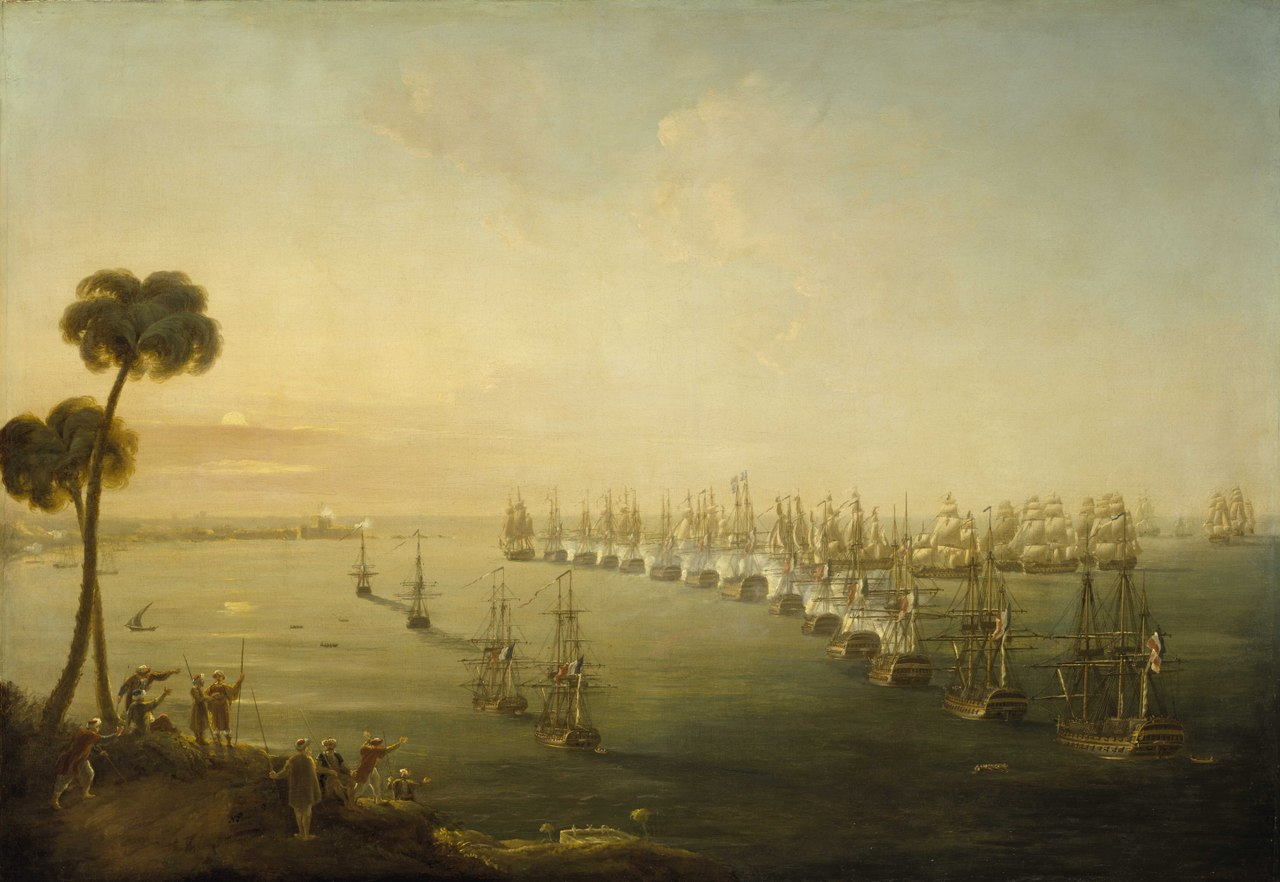
The Battle of the Nile, 1 August 1798, Nicholas Pocock, 1808, National Maritime Museum

Shortly after the French order to set sail was abandoned, the British fleet began rapidly approaching once more. Brueys, now expecting to come under attack that night, ordered each of his ships to place springs on their anchor cables and prepare for action. He sent the Alerte ahead, which passed close to the leading British ships and then steered sharply to the west over the shoal, in the hope that the ships of the line might follow and become grounded. None of Nelson's captains fell for the ruse and the British fleet continued undeterred. At 17:30, Nelson hailed one of his two leading ships, HMS Zealous under Captain Samuel Hood, which had been racing Goliath to be the first to fire on the French. The admiral ordered Hood to establish the safest course into the harbour. The British had no charts of the depth or shape of the bay, except a rough sketch map Swiftsure had obtained from a merchant captain, an inaccurate British atlas on Zealous, and a 35-year-old French map aboard Goliath. Hood replied that he would take careful soundings as he advanced to test the depth of the water, and that, "If you will allow the honour of leading you into battle, I will keep the lead going." Shortly afterwards, Nelson paused to speak with the brig HMS Mutine, whose commander, Lieutenant Thomas Hardy, had seized some maritime pilots from a small Alexandrine vessel. As Vanguard came to a stop, the following ships slowed. This caused a gap to open up between Zealous and Goliath and the rest of the fleet. To counter this effect, Nelson ordered HMS Theseus under Captain Ralph Miller to pass his flagship and join Zealous and Goliath in the vanguard. By 18:00, the British fleet was again under full sail, Vanguard sixth in the line of ten ships as Culloden trailed behind to the north and Alexander and Swiftsure hastened to catch up to the west. Following the rapid change from a loose formation to a rigid line of battle, both fleets raised their colours; each British ship hoisted additional Union Flags in its rigging in case its main flag was shot away. At 18:20, as Goliath and Zealous rapidly bore down on them, the leading French ships Guerrier and Conquérant opened fire.

Map of ship positions and movements during the Battle of Aboukir Bay, 1–2 August 1798. British ships are in red; French ships are in blue. Intermediate ship positions are shown in pale red/blue. The map has been simplified, and differs from the text in several minor particulars.

Ten minutes after the French opened fire, Goliath, ignoring fire from the fort to starboard and from Guerrier to port, most of which was too high to trouble the ship, crossed the head of the French line. Captain Thomas Foley had noticed as he approached that there was an unexpected gap between Guerrier and the shallow water of the shoal. On his own initiative, Foley decided to exploit this tactical error and changed his angle of approach to sail through the gap. As the bow of Guerrier came within range, Goliath opened fire, inflicting severe damage with a double-shotted raking broadside as the British ship turned to port and passed down the unprepared port side of Guerrier. Foley's Royal Marines and a company of Austrian grenadiers joined the attack, firing their muskets. Foley had intended to anchor alongside the French ship and engage it closely, but his anchor took too long to descend and his ship passed Guerrier entirely. Goliath eventually stopped close to the bow of Conquérant, opening fire on the new opponent and using the unengaged starboard guns to exchange occasional shots with the frigate Sérieuse and bomb vessel Hercule, which were anchored inshore of the battle line.

Foley's attack was followed by Hood in Zealous, who also crossed the French line and successfully anchored next to Guerrier in the space Foley had intended, engaging the lead ship's bow from close range. Within five minutes Guerrier's foremast had fallen, to cheers from the crews of the approaching British ships. The speed of the British advance took the French captains by surprise; they were still aboard Orient in conference with the admiral when the firing started. Hastily launching their boats, they returned to their vessels. Captain Jean-François-Timothée Trullet of Guerrier shouted orders from his barge for his men to return fire on Zealous.

The third British ship into action was HMS Orion under Captain Sir James Saumarez, which rounded the engagement at the head of the battle line and passed between the French main line and the frigates that lay closer inshore. As he did so, the frigate Sérieuse opened fire on Orion, wounding two men. The convention in naval warfare of the time was that ships of the line did not attack frigates when there were ships of equal size to engage, but in firing first French Captain Claude-Jean Martin had negated the rule. Saumarez waited until the frigate was at close range before replying. Orion needed just one broadside to reduce the frigate to a wreck, and Martin's disabled ship drifted away over the shoal. During the delay this detour caused, two other British ships joined the battle: Theseus, which had been disguised as a first-rate ship, followed Foley's track across Guerrier's bow. Miller steered his ship through the middle of the melee between the anchored British and French ships until he encountered the third French ship, Spartiate. Anchoring to port, Miller's ship opened fire at close range. HMS Audacious under Captain Davidge Gould crossed the French line between Guerrier and Conquérant, anchoring between the ships and raking them both. Orion then rejoined the action further south than intended, firing on the fifth French ship, Peuple Souverain, and Admiral Blanquet's flagship, Franklin.

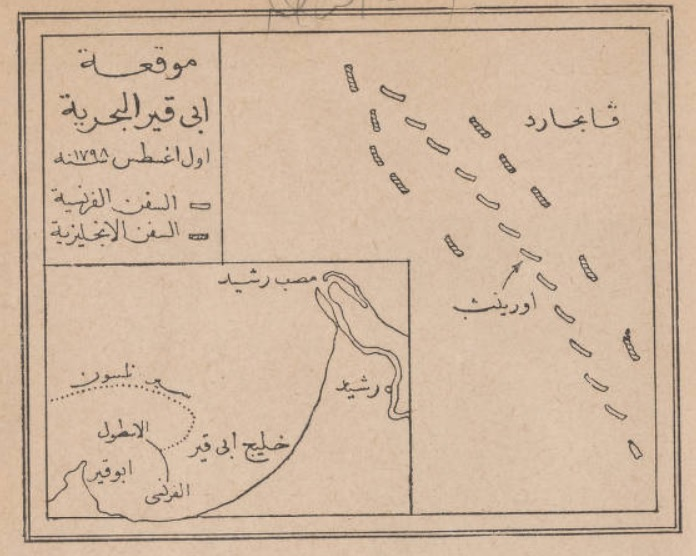
Battle of the Nile – Rif'at

The next three British ships, Vanguard in the lead followed by HMS Minotaur and HMS Defence, remained in line of battle formation and anchored on the starboard side of the French line at 18:40. Nelson focused his flagship's fire on Spartiate, while Captain Thomas Louis in Minotaur attacked the unengaged Aquilon and Captain John Peyton in Defence joined the attack on Peuple Souverain. With the French vanguard now heavily outnumbered, the following British ships, HMS Bellerophon and HMS Majestic, passed by the melee and advanced on the so far unengaged French centre. Both ships were soon fighting enemies much more powerful than they and began to take severe damage. Captain Henry Darby on Bellerophon missed his intended anchor near Franklin and instead found his ship underneath the main battery of the French flagship. Captain George Blagdon Westcott on Majestic also missed his station and almost collided with Heureux, coming under heavy fire from Tonnant. Unable to stop in time, Westcott's jib boom became entangled with Tonnant's shroud.

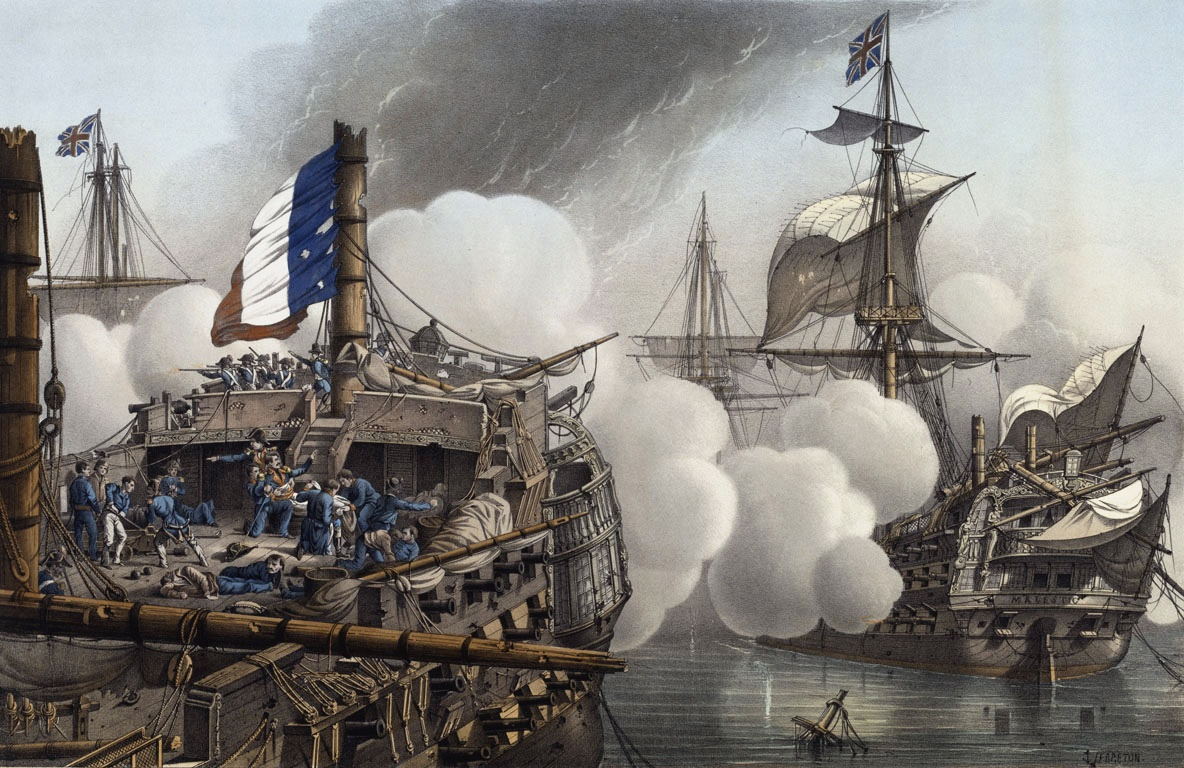
Tonnant under fire from HMS Majestic at the Battle of the Nile.

The French suffered too, Admiral Brueys on Orient was severely wounded in the face and hand by flying debris during the opening exchange of fire with Bellerophon. The final ship of the British line, Culloden under Troubridge, sailed too close to Aboukir Island in the growing darkness and became stuck fast on the shoal. Despite strenuous efforts from the Culloden's boats, the brig Mutine and the 50-gun HMS Leander under Captain Thomas Thompson, the ship of the line could not be moved, and the waves drove Culloden further onto the shoal, inflicting severe damage to the ship's hull.

=== Surrender of the French vanguard ===
At 19:00 the identifying lights in the mizzenmasts of the British fleet were lit. By this time, Guerrier had been completely dismasted and heavily battered. Zealous by contrast was barely touched: Hood had situated Zealous outside the arc of most of the French ship's broadsides, and in any case Guerrier was not prepared for an engagement on both sides simultaneously, with its port guns blocked by stores. Although their ship was a wreck, the crew of Guerrier refused to surrender, continuing to fire the few functional guns whenever possible despite heavy answering fire from Zealous. In addition to his cannon fire, Hood called up his marines and ordered them to fire volleys of musket shot at the deck of the French ship, driving the crew out of sight but still failing to secure the surrender from Captain Trullet. It was not until 21:00, when Hood sent a small boat to Guerrier with a boarding party, that the French ship finally surrendered. Conquérant was defeated more rapidly, after heavy broadsides from passing British ships and the close attentions of Audacious and Goliath brought down all three masts before 19:00. With his ship immobile and badly damaged, the mortally wounded Captain Etienne Dalbarade struck his colours and a boarding party seized control. Unlike Zealous, these British ships suffered relatively severe damage in the engagement. Goliath lost most of its rigging, suffered damage to all three masts and suffered more than 60 casualties. With his opponents defeated, Captain Gould on Audacious used the spring on his cable to transfer fire to Spartiate, the next French ship in line. To the west of the battle the battered Sérieuse sank over the shoal. Her masts protruded from the water as survivors scrambled into boats and rowed for the shore.

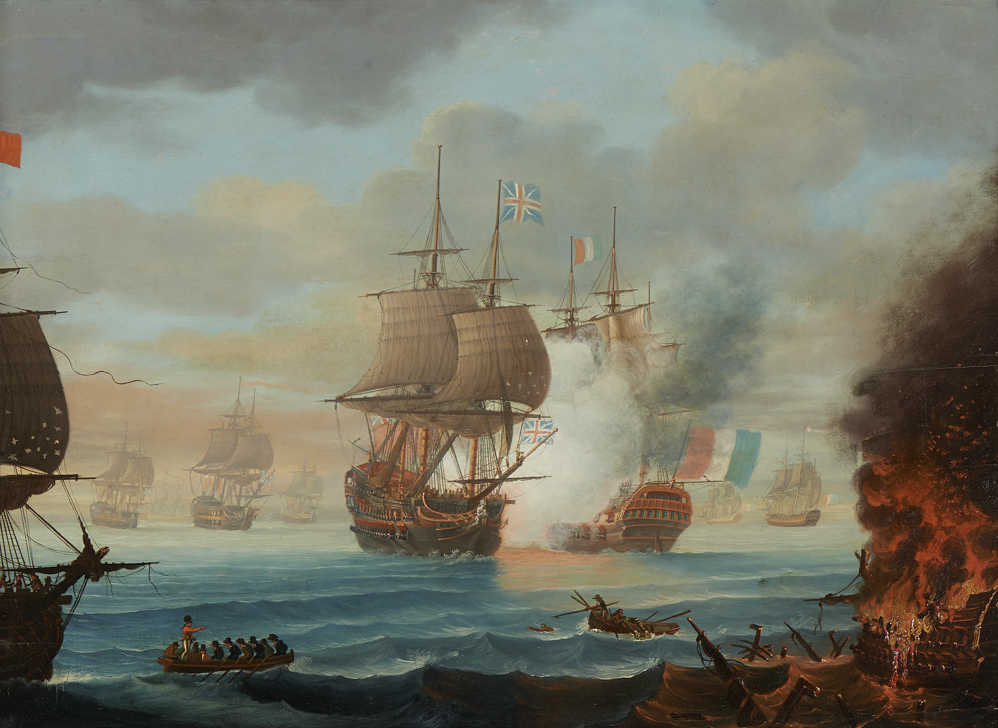
19th-century painting of the battle

The transfer of Audacious's broadside to Spartiate meant that Captain Maurice-Julien Emeriau now faced three opponents. Within minutes all three of his ship's masts had fallen, but the battle around Spartiate continued until 21:00, when the badly wounded Emeriau ordered his colours struck. Although Spartiate was outnumbered, it had been supported by the next in line, Aquilon, which was the only ship of the French van squadron fighting a single opponent, Minotaur. Captain Antoine René Thévenard used the spring on his anchor cable to angle his broadside into a raking position across the bow of Nelson's flagship, which consequently suffered more than 100 casualties, including the admiral. At approximately 20:30, an iron splinter fired in a langrage shot from Spartiate struck Nelson over his blinded right eye. The wound caused a flap of skin to fall across his face, rendering him temporarily completely blind. Nelson collapsed into the arms of Captain Edward Berry and was carried below. Certain that his wound was fatal, he cried out "I am killed, remember me to my wife", and called for his chaplain, Stephen Comyn. The wound was immediately inspected by Vanguard's surgeon Michael Jefferson, who informed the admiral that it was a simple flesh wound and stitched the skin together. Nelson subsequently ignored Jefferson's instructions to remain inactive, returning to the quarterdeck shortly before the explosion on Orient to oversee the closing stages of the battle. Although Thévenard's manoeuvre was successful, it placed his own bow under Minotaur's guns and by 21:25 the French ship was dismasted and battered, Captain Thévenard killed and his junior officers forced to surrender. With his opponent defeated, Captain Thomas Louis then took Minotaur south to join the attack on Franklin.

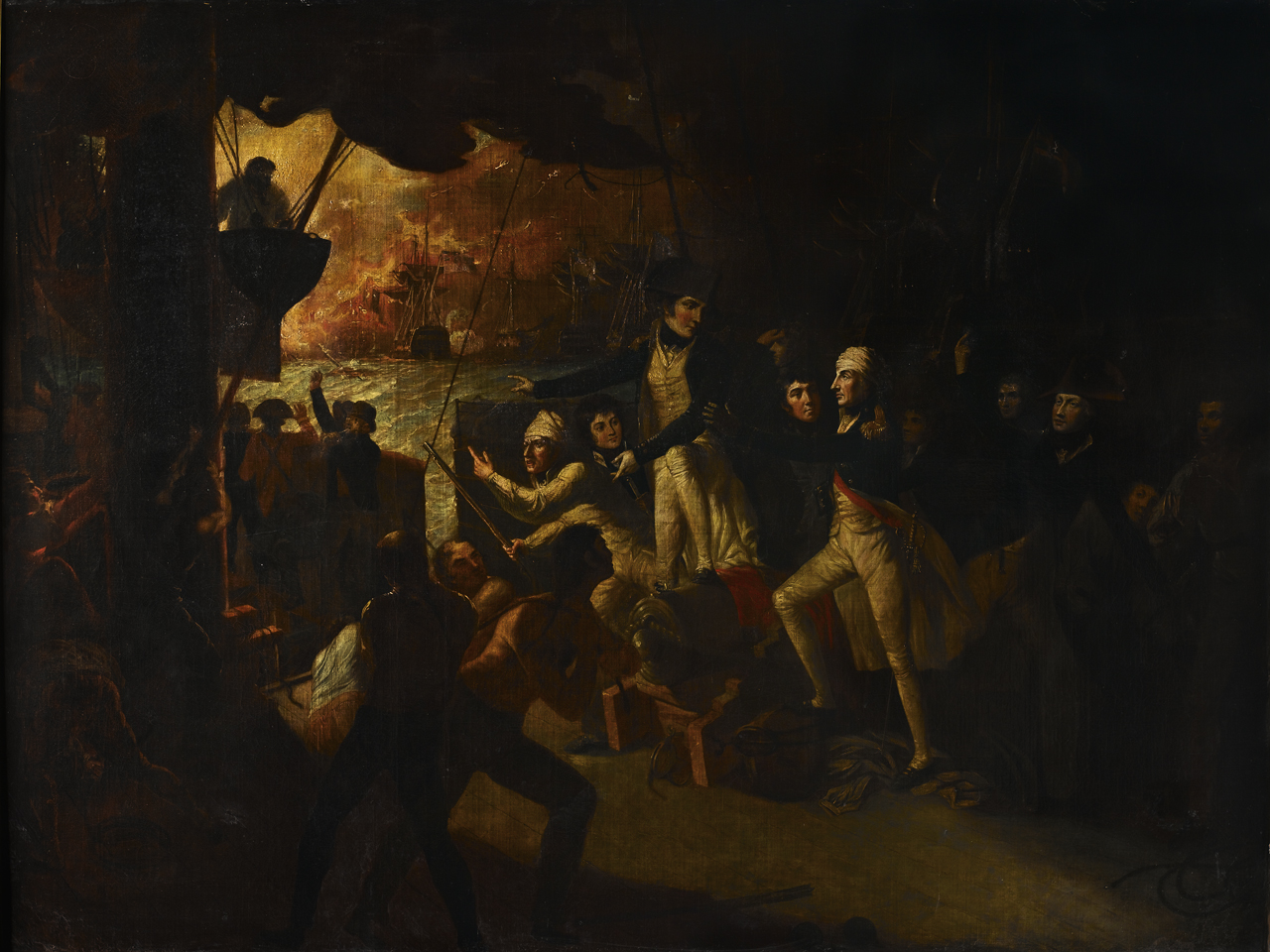
Battle of the Nile, 1 August 1798, Daniel Orme, 1805, National Maritime Museum. Nelson returns on deck after his wound is dressed.

Defence and Orion attacked the fifth French ship, Peuple Souverain, from either side and the ship rapidly lost the fore and main masts. Aboard the Orion, a wooden block was smashed off one of the ship's masts, killing two men before wounding Captain Saumarez in the thigh. On Peuple Souverain, Captain Pierre-Paul Raccord was badly wounded and ordered his ship's anchor cable cut in an effort to escape the bombardment. Peuple Souverain drifted south towards the flagship Orient, which mistakenly opened fire on the darkened vessel. Orion and Defence were unable to immediately pursue. Defence had lost its fore topmast and an improvised fireship that drifted through the battle narrowly missed Orion. The origin of this vessel, an abandoned and burning ship's boat laden with highly flammable material, is uncertain, but it may have been launched from Guerrier as the battle began. Peuple Souverain anchored not far from Orient, but took no further part in the fighting. The wrecked ship surrendered during the night. Franklin remained in combat, but Blanquet had suffered a severe head wound and Captain Gillet had been carried below unconscious with severe wounds. Shortly afterwards, a fire broke out on the quarterdeck after an arms locker exploded, which was eventually extinguished with difficulty by the crew.

To the south, HMS Bellerophon was in serious trouble as the huge broadside of Orient pounded the ship. At 19:50 the mizzenmast and main mast both collapsed and fires broke out simultaneously at several points. Although the blazes were extinguished, the ship had suffered more than 200 casualties. Captain Darby recognised that his position was untenable and ordered the anchor cables cut at 20:20. The battered ship drifted away from the battle under continued fire from Tonnant as the foremast collapsed as well. Orient had also suffered significant damage and Admiral Brueys had been struck in the midriff by a cannonball that almost cut him in half. He died fifteen minutes later, remaining on deck and refusing to be carried below. Orient's captain, Luc-Julien-Joseph Casabianca, was also wounded, struck in the face by flying debris and knocked unconscious, while his twelve-year-old son had a leg torn off by a cannonball as he stood beside his father. The most southerly British ship, Majestic, had become briefly entangled with the 80-gun Tonnant, and in the resulting battle, suffered heavy casualties. Captain George Blagdon Westcott was among the dead, killed by French musket fire. Lieutenant Robert Cuthbert assumed command and successfully disentangled his ship, allowing the badly damaged Majestic to drift further southwards so that by 20:30 it was stationed between Tonnant and the next in line, Heureux, engaging both. To support the centre, Captain Thompson of Leander abandoned the futile efforts to drag the stranded Culloden off the shoal and sailed down the embattled French line, entering the gap created by the drifting Peuple Souverain and opening a fierce raking fire on Franklin and Orient.

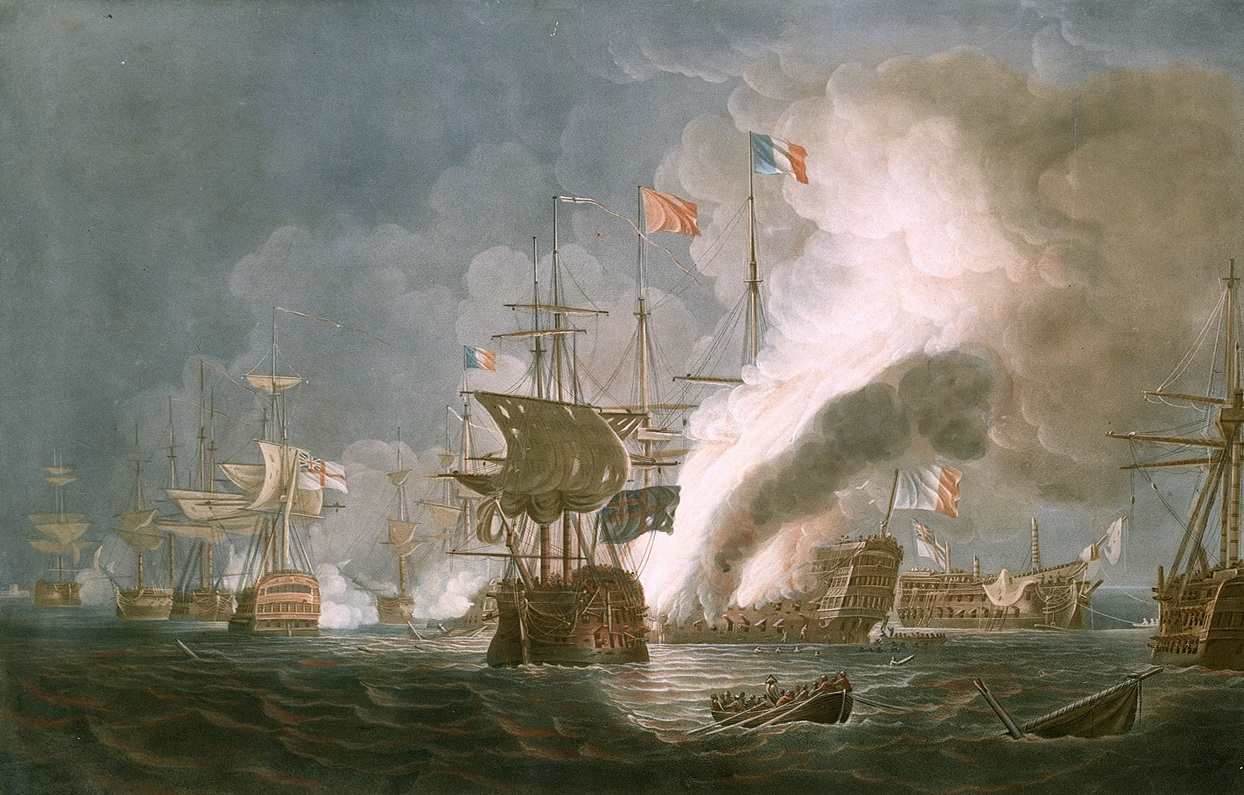
A 1799 depiction of the Battle of the Nile by Thomas Whitcombe. Orient is on fire, and visible under her stern, and drifting clear of the burning ship, is the dismasted Bellerophon.

While the battle raged in the bay, the two straggling British ships made strenuous efforts to join the engagement, focusing on the flashes of gunfire in the darkness. Warned away from the Aboukir shoals by the grounded Culloden, Captain Benjamin Hallowell in Swiftsure passed the melee at the head of the line and aimed his ship at the French centre. Shortly after 20:00, a dismasted hulk was spotted drifting in front of Swiftsure and Hallowell initially ordered his men to fire before rescinding the order, concerned for the identity of the strange vessel. Hailing the battered ship, Hallowell received the reply "Bellerophon, going out of action disabled." Relieved that he had not accidentally attacked one of his own ships in the darkness, Hallowell pulled up between Orient and Franklin and opened fire on them both. Alexander, the final unengaged British ship, which had followed Swiftsure, pulled up close to Tonnant, which had begun to drift away from the embattled French flagship. Captain Alexander Ball then joined the attack on Orient.

=== Destruction of L'Orient ===
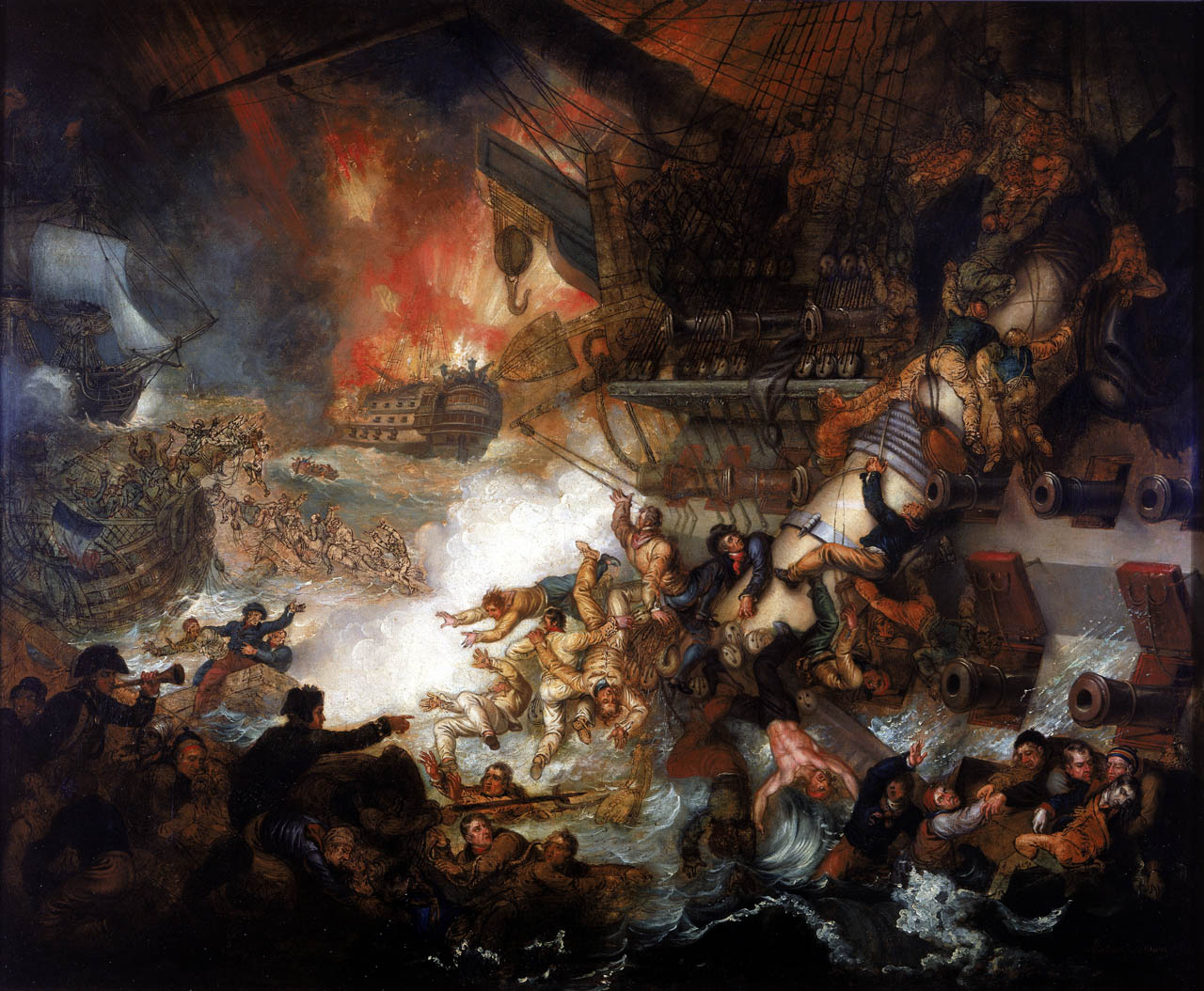
The Battle of the Nile (Mather Brown, 1825)

At 21:00, the British observed a fire on the lower decks of the Orient, the French flagship. Identifying the danger this posed to the Orient, Captain Hallowell directed his gun crews to fire their guns directly into the blaze. Sustained British gun fire spread the flames throughout the ship's stern and prevented all efforts to extinguish them. Within minutes the fire had ascended the rigging and set the vast sails alight. The nearest British ships, Swiftsure, Alexander, and Orion, all stopped firing, closed their gunports, and began edging away from the burning ship in anticipation of the detonation of the enormous ammunition supplies stored on board. In addition, they took crews away from the guns to form fire parties and to soak the sails and decks in seawater to help contain any resulting fires. Likewise the French ships Tonnant, Heureux, and Mercure all cut their anchor cables and drifted southwards away from the burning ship. At 22:00 the fire reached the magazines, and the Orient was destroyed by a massive explosion. The concussion of the blast was powerful enough to rip open the seams of the nearest ships, and flaming wreckage landed in a huge circle, much of it flying directly over the surrounding ships into the sea beyond. Falling wreckage started fires on Swiftsure, Alexander, and Franklin, although in each case teams of sailors with water buckets succeeded in extinguishing the flames, despite a secondary explosion on Franklin.

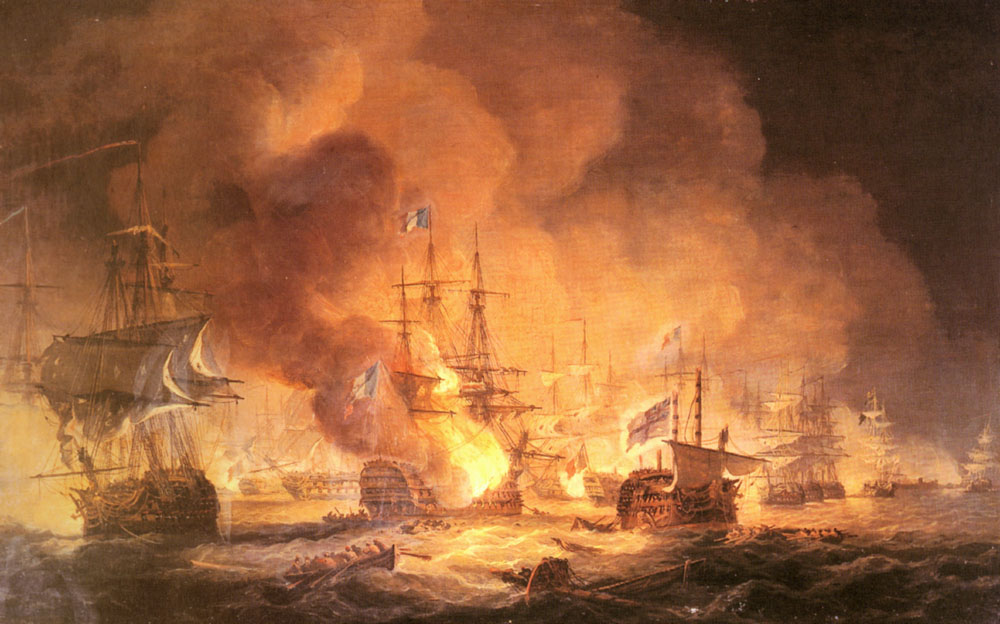
Battle of the Nile, Thomas Luny, 1834

It has never been firmly established how the fire on Orient broke out, but one common account is that jars of oil and paint had been left on the poop deck, instead of being properly stowed after painting of the ship's hull had been completed shortly before the battle. Burning wadding from one of the British ships is believed to have floated onto the poop deck and ignited the paint. The fire rapidly spread through the admiral's cabin and into a ready magazine that stored carcass ammunition, which was designed to burn more fiercely in water than in air. Alternatively, Fleet Captain Honoré Ganteaume later reported the cause as an explosion on the quarterdeck, preceded by a series of minor fires on the main deck among the ship's boats. Whatever its origin, the fire spread rapidly through the ship's rigging, unchecked by the fire pumps aboard, which had been smashed by British shot. A second blaze then began at the bow, trapping hundreds of sailors in the ship's waist. Subsequent archaeological investigation found debris scattered over 500 metres (550 yd) of seabed and evidence that the ship was wracked by two explosions. Hundreds of men dived into the sea to escape the flames, but fewer than 100 survived the blast. British boats picked up approximately 70 survivors, including the wounded staff officer Léonard-Bernard Motard. A few others, including Ganteaume, managed to reach the shore on rafts. The remainder of the crew, numbering more than 1,000 men, were killed, including Captain Casabianca and his son, Giocante.

For ten minutes after the explosion there was no firing; sailors from both sides were either too shocked by the blast or desperately extinguishing fires aboard their own ships to continue the fight. During the lull, Nelson gave orders that boats be sent to pull survivors from the water around the remains of Orient. At 22:10, Franklin restarted the engagement by firing on Swiftsure. Isolated and battered, Blanquet's ship was soon dismasted and the admiral, suffering a severe head wound, was forced to surrender by the combined firepower of Swiftsure and Defence. More than half of Franklin's crew had been killed or wounded.

By midnight only Tonnant remained engaged, as Commodore Aristide Aubert Du Petit Thouars continued his fight with Majestic and fired on Swiftsure when the British ship moved within range. By 03:00, after more than three hours of close quarter combat, Majestic had lost its main and mizzen masts while Tonnant was a dismasted hulk. Although Captain Du Petit Thouars had lost both legs and an arm he remained in command, insisting on having the tricolour nailed to the mast to prevent it from being struck and giving orders from his position propped up on deck in a bucket of wheat. Under his guidance, the battered Tonnant gradually drifted southwards away from the action to join the southern division under Villeneuve, who failed to bring these ships into effective action. Throughout the engagement the French rear had kept up an arbitrary fire on the battling ships ahead. The only noticeable effect was the smashing of Timoléon's rudder by misdirected fire from the neighbouring Généreux.

=== Morning ===
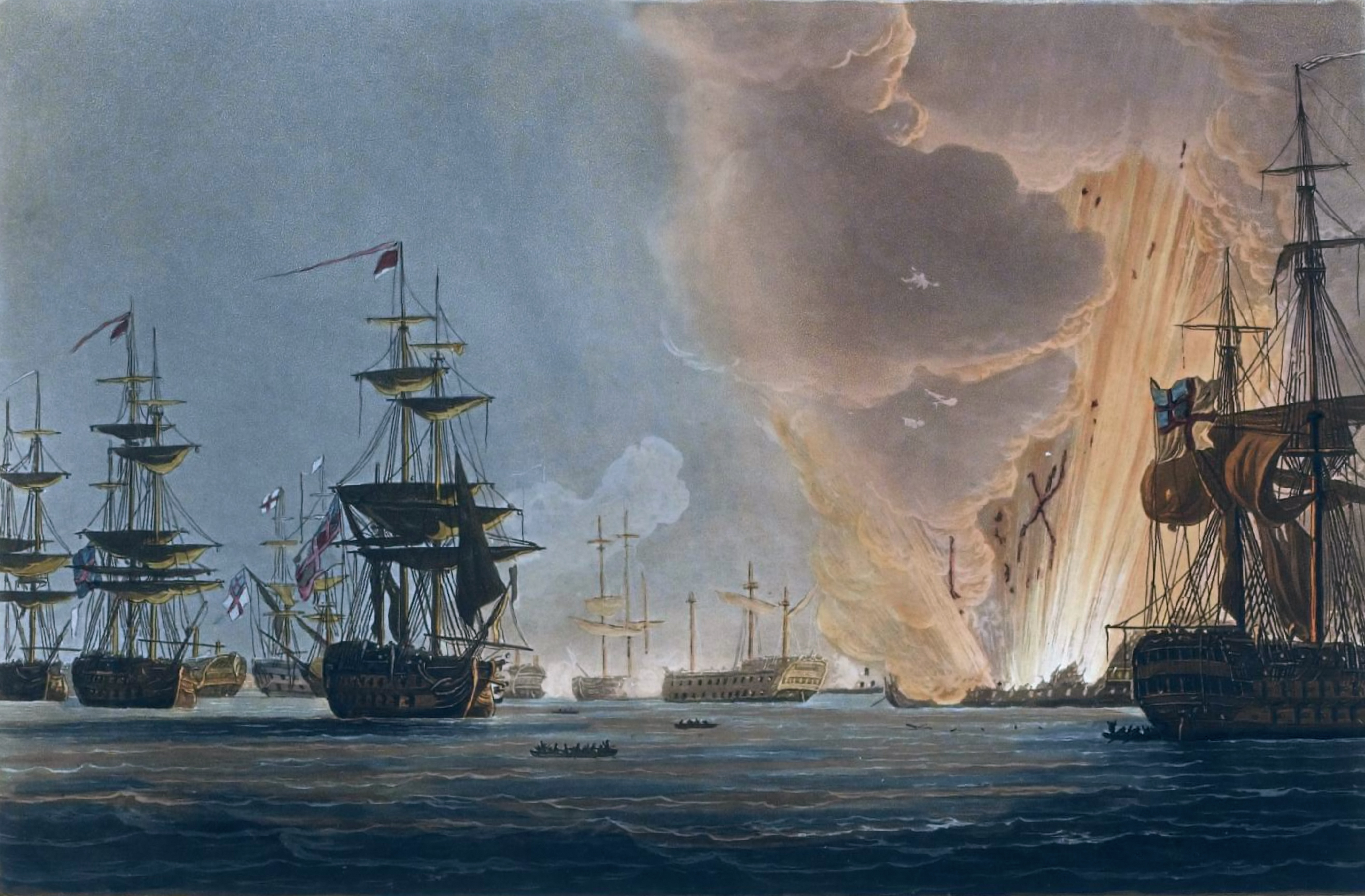
Battle of the Nile, Augt 1st 1798, Thomas Whitcombe, 1816, National Maritime Museum – the climax of the battle, as Orient explodes

As the sun rose at 04:00 on 2 August, firing broke out once again between the French southern division of Guillaume Tell, Tonnant, Généreux and Timoléon and the battered Alexander and Majestic. Although briefly outmatched, the British ships were soon joined by Goliath and Theseus. As Captain Miller manoeuvred his ship into position, Theseus briefly came under fire from the frigate Artémise. Miller turned his ship towards Artémise, but Captain Pierre-Jean Standelet struck his flag and ordered his men to abandon the frigate. Miller sent a boat under Lieutenant William Hoste to take possession of the empty vessel, but Standelet had set fire to his ship as he left and Artémise blew up shortly afterwards. The surviving French ships of the line, covering their retreat with gunfire, gradually pulled to the east away from the shore at 06:00. Zealous pursued, and was able to prevent the frigate Justice from boarding Bellerophon, which was anchored at the southern point of the bay undergoing hasty repairs.

Two other French ships still flew the tricolour, but neither was in a position to either retreat or fight. When Heureux and Mercure had cut their anchor cables to escape the exploding Orient, their crews had panicked and neither captain (both of whom were wounded) had managed to regain control of his ship. As a result, both vessels had drifted onto the shoal. Alexander, Goliath, Theseus and Leander attacked the stranded and defenceless ships, and both surrendered within minutes. The distractions provided by Heureux, Mercure and Justice allowed Villeneuve to bring most of the surviving French ships to the mouth of the bay at 11:00. On the dismasted Tonnant, Commodore Du Petit Thouars was now dead from his wounds and thrown overboard at his own request. As the ship was unable to make the required speed it was driven ashore by its crew. Timoléon was too far south to escape with Villeneuve and, in attempting to join the survivors, had also grounded on the shoal. The force of the impact dislodged the ship's foremast. The remaining French vessels—the ships of the line Guillaume Tell and Généreux and the frigates Justice and Diane—formed up and stood out to sea, pursued by Zealous. Despite strenuous efforts, Captain Hood's isolated ship came under heavy fire and was unable to cut off the trailing Justice as the French survivors escaped seawards. Zealous was struck by a number of French shot and lost one man killed.

For the remainder of 2 August Nelson's ships made improvised repairs and boarded and consolidated their prizes. Culloden especially required assistance. Troubridge, having finally dragged his ship off the shoal at 02:00, found that he had lost his rudder and was taking on more than 120 long tons (122 t) of water an hour. Emergency repairs to the hull and fashioning a replacement rudder from a spare topmast took most of the next two days. On the morning of 3 August, Nelson sent Theseus and Leander to force the surrender of the grounded Tonnant and Timoléon. The Tonnant, its decks crowded with 1,600 survivors from other French vessels, surrendered as the British ships approached while Timoléon was set on fire by its remaining crew who then escaped to the shore in small boats. Timoléon exploded shortly after midday, the eleventh and final French ship of the line destroyed or captured during the battle.

== Aftermath ==
[I] went on deck to view the state of the fleets, and an awful sight it was. The whole bay was covered with dead bodies, mangled, wounded and scorched, not a bit of clothes on them except their trousers.

— Account by Seaman John Nicol of Goliath

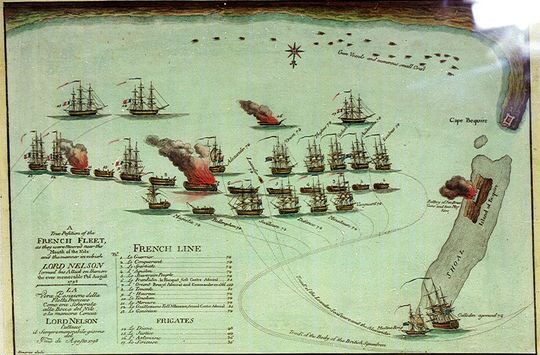
A True Position of the French fleet as they were moored near the Mouth of the Nile and the manner in which Lord Nelson formed his attack on them, Robert Dodd, 1800, National Maritime Museum

British casualties in the battle were recorded with some accuracy in the immediate aftermath as 218 killed and approximately 677 wounded, although the number of wounded who subsequently died is not known. The ships that suffered most were Bellerophon with 201 casualties and Majestic with 193. Other than Culloden the lightest loss was on Zealous, which had one man killed and seven wounded.

The casualty list included Captain Westcott, five lieutenants and ten junior officers among the dead, and Admiral Nelson, Captains Saumarez, Ball and Darby, and six lieutenants wounded. Other than Culloden, the only British ships seriously damaged in their hulls were Bellerophon, Majestic, and Vanguard. Bellerophon and Majestic were the only ships to lose masts: Majestic the main and mizzen and Bellerophon all three.

French casualties are harder to calculate but were significantly higher. Estimates of French losses range from 2,000 to 5,000, with a suggested median point of 3,500, which includes more than 1,000 captured and wounded and nearly 2,000 killed, half of whom died on Orient. In addition to Admiral Brueys killed and Admiral Blanquet wounded, four captains died and seven others were seriously wounded. The French ships suffered severe damage: Two ships of the line and two frigates were destroyed (as well as a bomb vessel scuttled by its crew), and three other captured ships were too battered ever to sail again. Of the remaining prizes, only three were ever sufficiently repaired for frontline service. For weeks after the battle, bodies washed up along the Egyptian coast, decaying slowly in the intense, dry heat.

Nelson, who on surveying the bay on the morning of 2 August said, "Victory is not a name strong enough for such a scene", remained at anchor in Aboukir Bay for the next two weeks, preoccupied with recovering from his wound, writing dispatches, and assessing the military situation in Egypt using documents captured on board one of the prizes. Nelson's head wound was recorded as being "three inches long" with "the cranium exposed for one inch". He suffered pain from the injury for the rest of his life and was badly scarred, styling his hair to disguise it as much as possible. As their commander recovered, his men stripped the wrecks of useful supplies and made repairs to their ships and prizes.

Throughout the week, Aboukir Bay was surrounded by bonfires lit by Bedouin tribesmen in celebration of the British victory. On 5 August, Leander was despatched to Cádiz with messages for Earl St. Vincent carried by Captain Edward Berry. Over the next few days the British landed all but 200 of the captured prisoners on shore under strict terms of parole, although Bonaparte later ordered them to be formed into an infantry unit and added to his army. The wounded officers taken prisoner were held on board Vanguard, where Nelson regularly entertained them at dinner. Historian Joseph Allen recounts that on one occasion Nelson, whose eyesight was still suffering following his wound, offered toothpicks to an officer who had lost his teeth and then passed a snuff-box to an officer whose nose had been torn off, causing much embarrassment. On 8 August the fleet's boats stormed Aboukir Island, which surrendered without a fight. The landing party removed four of the guns and destroyed the rest along with the fort they were mounted in, renaming the island "Nelson's Island".

On 10 August, Nelson sent Lieutenant Thomas Duval from Zealous with messages to East India Company (EIC) authorities in India. Duval travelled across the Middle East overland via camel train to Aleppo and took the EIC ship Fly from Basra to Bombay, acquainting Governor-General of India Viscount Wellesley with the situation in Egypt. On 12 August the frigates HMS Emerald under Captain Thomas Moutray Waller and HMS Alcmene under Captain George Johnstone Hope, and the sloop HMS Bonne Citoyenne under Captain Robert Retalick, arrived off Alexandria. Initially the British mistook the frigate squadron for French warships and Swiftsure chased them away. They returned the following day once the error had been realised. The same day as the frigates arrived, Nelson sent Mutine to Britain with dispatches, under the command of Lieutenant Thomas Bladen Capel, who had replaced Hardy after the latter's promotion to captain of Vanguard. On 14 August, Nelson sent Orion, Majestic, Bellerophon, Minotaur, Defence, Audacious, Theseus, Franklin, Tonnant, Aquilon, Conquérant, Peuple Souverain, and Spartiate to sea under the command of Saumarez. Many ships had only jury masts and it took a full day for the convoy to reach the mouth of the bay, finally sailing into open water on 15 August. On 16 August the British burned and destroyed the grounded prize Heureux as no longer fit for service and on 18 August also burned Guerrier and Mercure. On 19 August, Nelson sailed for Naples with Vanguard, Culloden, and Alexander, leaving Hood in command of Zealous, Goliath, Swiftsure, and the recently joined frigates to watch over French activities at Alexandria.

The first message to reach Bonaparte regarding the disaster that had overtaken his fleet arrived on 14 August at his camp on the road between Salahieh and Cairo. The messenger was a staff officer sent by the Governor of Alexandria General Jean Baptiste Kléber, and the report had been hastily written by Admiral Ganteaume, who had subsequently rejoined Villeneuve's ships at sea. One account reports that when he was handed the message, Bonaparte read it without emotion before calling the messenger to him and demanding further details. When the messenger had finished, the French general reportedly announced "Nous n'avons plus de flotte: eh bien. Il faut rester en ces contrées, ou en sortir grands comme les anciens" ("We no longer have a fleet: well, we must either remain in this country or quit it as great as the ancients"). Another story, as told by the general's secretary, Bourienne, claims that Bonaparte was almost overcome by the news and exclaimed "Unfortunate Brueys, what have you done!" Bonaparte later placed much of the blame for the defeat on the wounded Admiral Blanquet, falsely accusing him of surrendering Franklin while his ship was undamaged. Protestations from Ganteaume and Minister Étienne Eustache Bruix later reduced the degree of criticism Blanquet faced, but he never again served in a command capacity. Bonaparte's most immediate concern however was with his own officers, who began to question the wisdom of the entire expedition. Inviting his most senior officers to dinner, Bonaparte asked them how they were. When they replied that they were "marvellous," Bonaparte responded that it was just as well, since he would have them shot if they continued "fostering mutinies and preaching revolt." To quell any uprising among the native inhabitants, Egyptians overheard discussing the battle were threatened with having their tongues cut out.

=== Reaction ===
Nelson's first set of dispatches was captured when Leander was intercepted and defeated by Généreux in a fierce engagement off the western shore of Crete on 18 August 1798. As a result, reports of the battle did not reach Britain until Capel arrived in Mutine on 2 October, entering the Admiralty at 11:15 and personally delivering the news to Lord Spencer, who collapsed unconscious when he heard the report. Although Nelson had previously been castigated in the press for failing to intercept the French fleet, rumours of the battle had begun to arrive in Britain from the continent in late September and the news Capel brought was greeted with celebrations right across the country. Within four days Nelson had been elevated to Baron Nelson of the Nile and Burnham Thorpe, a title with which he was privately dissatisfied, believing his actions deserved better reward. King George III addressed the Houses of Parliament on 20 November with the words:

The unexampled series of our naval triumphs has received fresh splendour from the memorable and decisive action, in which a detachment of my fleet, under the command of Rear-Admiral Lord Nelson, attacked, and almost totally destroyed a superior force of the enemy, strengthened by every advantage of situation. By this great and brilliant victory, an enterprise, of which the injustice, perfidy, and extravagance had fixed the attention of the world, and which was peculiarly directed against some of the most valuable interests of the British empire, has, in the first instance, been turned to the confusion of its authors and the blow thus given to the power and influence of France, has afforded an opening, which, if improved by suitable exertions on the part of other powers, may lead to the general deliverance of Europe.

— King George III, quoted in William James' The Naval History of Great Britain During the French Revolutionary and Napoleonic Wars, Volume 2, 1827,

Saumarez's convoy of prizes stopped first at Malta, where Saumarez provided assistance to a rebellion on the island among the Maltese population. It then sailed to Gibraltar, arriving on 18 October to the cheers of the garrison. Saumarez wrote that, "We can never do justice to the warmth of their applause, and the praises they all bestowed on our squadron." On 23 October, following the transfer of the wounded to the military hospital and provision of basic supplies, the convoy sailed on towards Lisbon, leaving Bellerophon and Majestic behind for more extensive repairs. Peuple Souverain also remained at Gibraltar: The ship was deemed too badly damaged for the Atlantic voyage to Britain and so was converted to a guardship under the name of HMS Guerrier. The remaining prizes underwent basic repairs and then sailed for Britain, spending some months at the Tagus and joining with the annual merchant convoy from Portugal in June 1799 under the escort of a squadron commanded by Admiral Sir Alan Gardner, before eventually arriving at Plymouth. Their age and battered state meant that neither Conquérant nor Aquilon were considered fit for active service in the Royal Navy and both were subsequently hulked, although they had been bought into the service for £20,000 (equivalent to £2.2 million in 2024) each as HMS Conquerant and HMS Aboukir to provide a financial reward to the crews that had captured them. Similar sums were also paid out for Guerrier, Mercure, Heureux and Peuple Souverain, while the other captured ships were worth considerably more. Constructed of Adriatic oak, Tonnant had been built in 1792 and Franklin and Spartiate were less than a year old. Tonnant and Spartiate, both of which later fought at the Battle of Trafalgar, joined the Royal Navy under their old names while Franklin, considered to be "the finest two-decked ship in the world", was renamed HMS Canopus. The total value of the prizes captured at the Nile and subsequently bought into the Royal Navy was estimated at just over £130,000 (equivalent to £14.5 million in 2024).

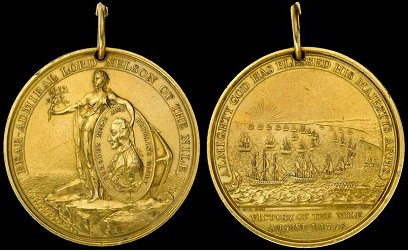
Battle of the Nile Medal in Gold. Normally worn from a wide blue ribbon. Grades: 4, awarded by rank. Gold: awarded to Nelson and his captains. Silver: awarded to lieutenants and warrant officers. Copper-Gilt: awarded to petty officers. Bronzed copper: awarded to ratings, marines, etc.

Additional awards were presented to the British fleet: Nelson was awarded £2,000 (£220,000 in 2024) a year for life by the Parliament of Great Britain and £1,000 per annum by the Parliament of Ireland, although the latter was inadvertently discontinued after the Act of Union dissolved the Irish Parliament. Both parliaments gave unanimous votes of thanks, each captain who served in the battle was presented with a specially minted gold medal and the first lieutenant of every ship engaged in the battle was promoted to commander. Troubridge and his men, initially excluded, received equal shares in the awards after Nelson personally interceded for the crew of the stranded Culloden, even though they did not directly participate in the engagement. The EIC presented Nelson with £10,000 (£1.1 million in 2024) in recognition of the benefit his action had on their holdings and the cities of London, Liverpool and other municipal and corporate bodies made similar awards. Nelson's own captains presented him with a sword and a portrait as "proof of their esteem." Nelson publicly encouraged this close bond with his officers and on 29 September 1798 described them as "We few, we happy few, we band of brothers", echoing William Shakespeare's play Henry V. From this grew the notion of the Nelsonic Band of Brothers, a cadre of high-quality naval officers that served with Nelson for the remainder of his life. Nearly five decades later the battle was among the actions recognised by a clasp attached to the Naval General Service Medal, awarded upon application to all British participants still living in 1847.

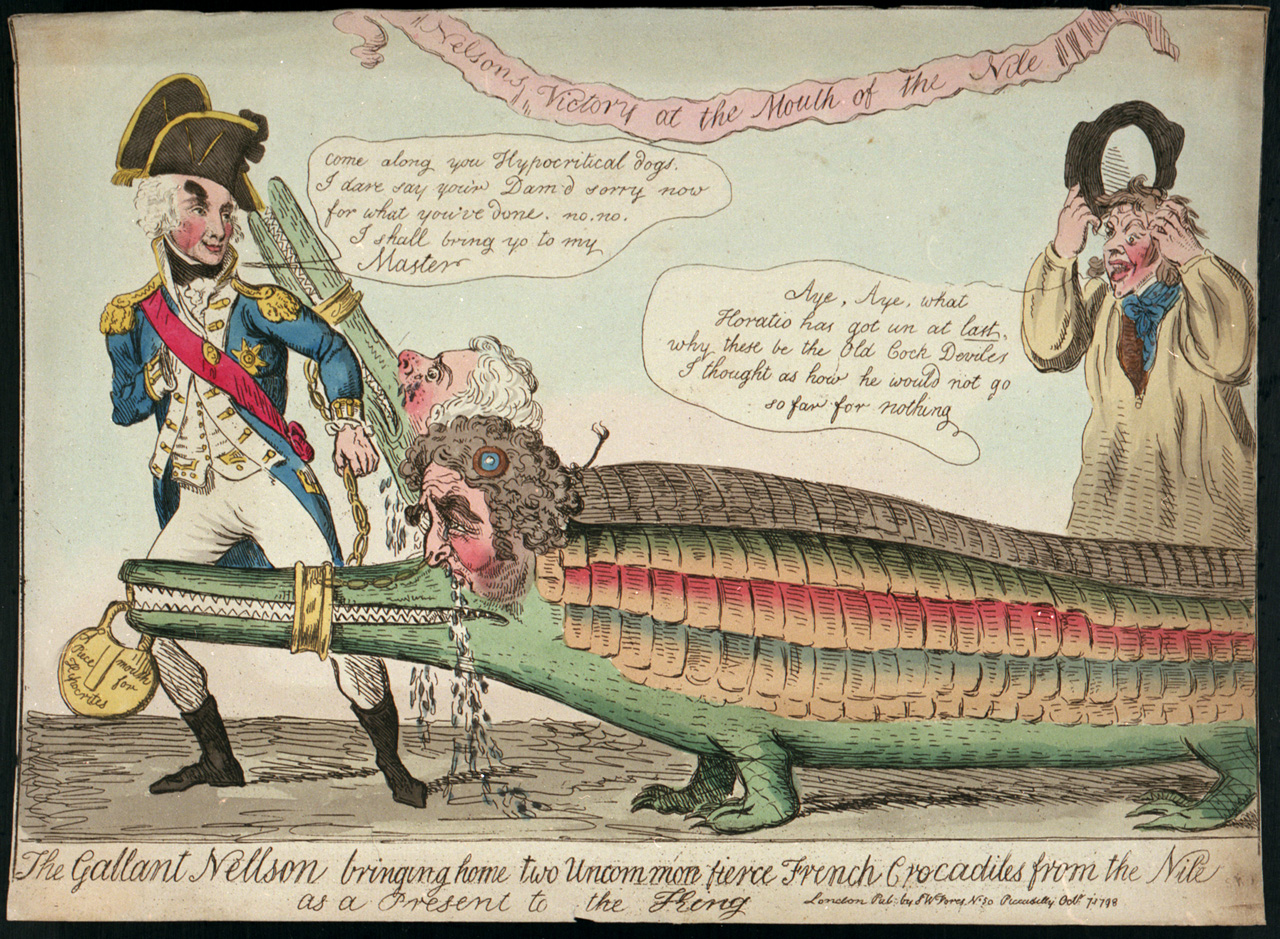
The Gallant Nellson bringing home two Uncommon fierce French Crocadiles from the Nile as a Present to the King, James Gillray, 1798, National Maritime Museum. The crocodiles represent Fox and Sheridan.

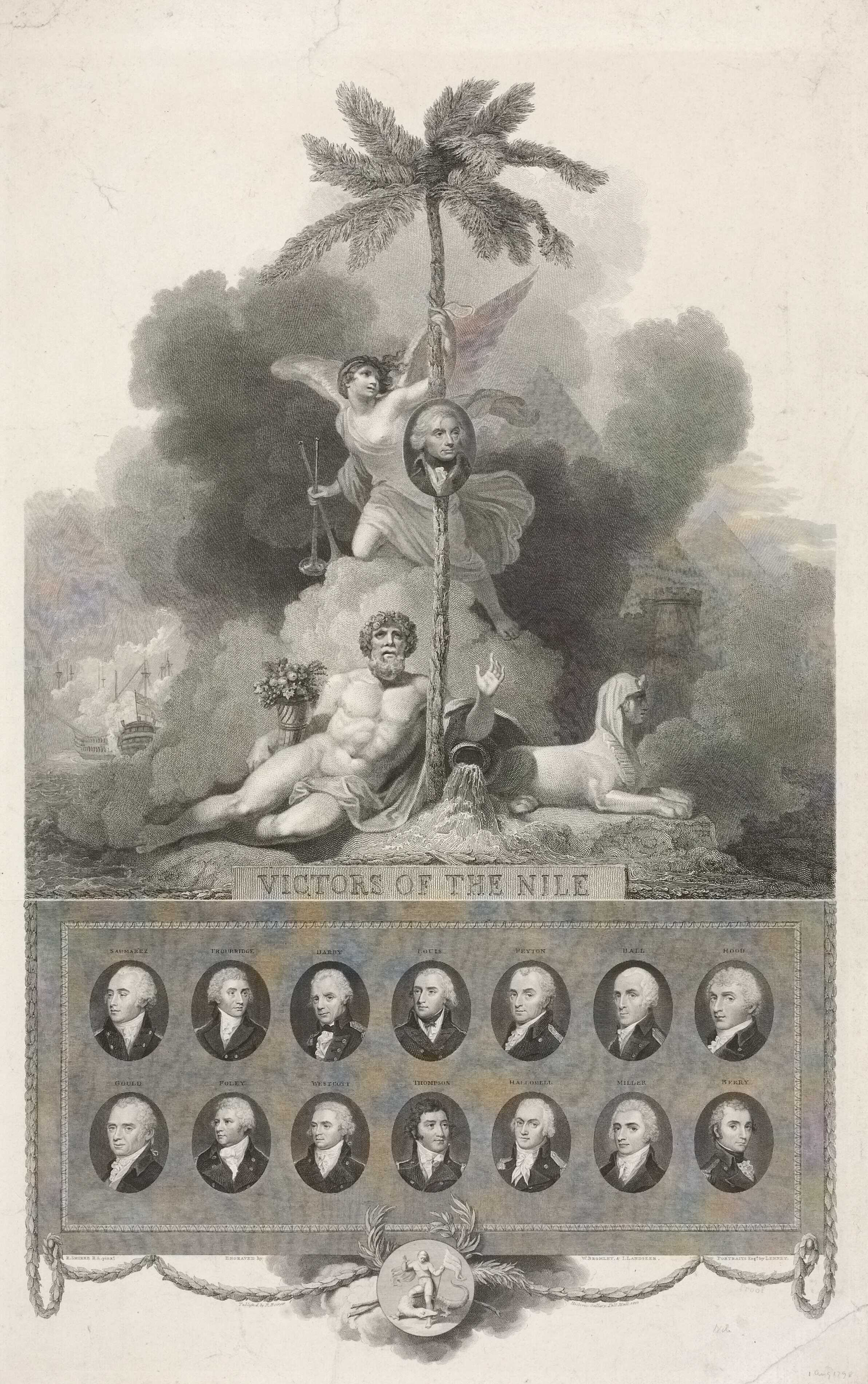
'Victors of the Nile', a celebratory engraving published five years after the Battle of the Nile, depicting Nelson and his 14 captains.

Other rewards were bestowed by foreign states, particularly the Ottoman Emperor Selim III, who made Nelson the first Knight Commander of the newly created Order of the Crescent, and presented him with a chelengk, a diamond studded rose, a sable fur and numerous other valuable presents. Tsar Paul I of Russia sent, among other rewards, a gold box studded with diamonds, and similar gifts in silver arrived from other European rulers. On his return to Naples, Nelson was greeted with a triumphal procession led by King Ferdinand IV and Sir William Hamilton and was introduced for only the third time to Sir William's wife Emma, Lady Hamilton, who fainted violently at the meeting, and apparently took several weeks to recover from her injuries. Lauded as a hero by the Neapolitan court, Nelson was later to dabble in Neapolitan politics and become the Duke of Bronté, actions for which he was criticised by his superiors and his reputation suffered. British general John Moore, who met Nelson in Naples at this time, described him as "covered with stars, medals and ribbons, more like a Prince of Opera than the Conqueror of the Nile."

Rumours of a battle first appeared in the French press as early as 7 August, although credible reports did not arrive until 26 August, and even these claimed that Nelson was dead and Bonaparte a British prisoner. When the news became certain, the French press insisted that the defeat was the result both of an overwhelmingly large British force and unspecified "traitors." Among the anti-government journals in France, the defeat was blamed on the incompetence of the French Directory and on supposed lingering Royalist sentiments in the Navy. Villeneuve came under scathing attack on his return to France for his failure to support Brueys during the battle. In his defence, he pleaded that the wind had been against him and that Brueys had not issued orders for him to counterattack the British fleet. Writing many years later, Bonaparte commented that if the French Navy had adopted the same tactical principles as the British:

Admiral Villeneuve would not have thought himself blameless at Aboukir, for remaining inactive with five or six ships, that is to say, with half the squadron, for twenty four hours, whilst the enemy was overpowering the other wing.

— Napoleon Bonaparte, Mémoires, Volume 1, 1823. Quoted in translation in Noel Mostert's The Line Upon a Wind, 2007

By contrast, the British press were jubilant; many newspapers sought to portray the battle as a victory for Britain over anarchy, and the success was used to attack the supposedly pro-republican Whig politicians Charles James Fox and Richard Brinsley Sheridan.

In the United States, the outcome of the battle led President John Adams to pursue diplomacy with France to end the Quasi-War, as the French naval defeat rendered the prospect of an invasion of the United States less likely.

There has been extensive historiographical debate over the comparative strengths of the fleets, although they were ostensibly evenly matched in size, each containing 13 ships of the line. However, the loss of Culloden, the relative sizes of Orient and Leander and the participation in the action by two of the French frigates and several smaller vessels, as well as the theoretical strength of the French position, leads most historians to the conclusion that the French were marginally more powerful. This is accentuated by the weight of broadside of several of the French ships: Spartiate, Franklin, Orient, Tonnant and Guillaume Tell were each significantly larger than any individual British ship in the battle. However inadequate deployment, reduced crews, and the failure of the rear division under Villeneuve to meaningfully participate, all contributed to the French defeat.

=== Effects ===
The Battle of the Nile has been called "arguably, the most decisive naval engagement of the great age of sail", and "the most splendid and glorious success which the British Navy gained." Historian and novelist C. S. Forester, writing in 1929, compared the Nile to the great naval actions in history and concluded that "it still only stands rivalled by Tsu-Shima as an example of the annihilation of one fleet by another of approximately equal material force". The effect on the strategic situation in the Mediterranean was immediate, reversing the balance of the conflict and giving the British control at sea that they maintained for the remainder of the war. The destruction of the French Mediterranean fleet allowed the Royal Navy to return to the sea in force, as British squadrons set up blockades off French and allied ports. In particular, British ships cut Malta off from France, aided by the rebellion among the native Maltese population that forced the French garrison to retreat to Valletta and shut the gates. The ensuing siege of Malta lasted for two years before the defenders were finally starved into surrender. In 1799, British ships harassed Bonaparte's army as it marched east and north through Palestine, and played a crucial part in Bonaparte's defeat at the siege of Acre, when the barges carrying the siege train were captured and the French storming parties were bombarded by British ships anchored offshore. It was during one of these latter engagements that Captain Miller of Theseus was killed in an ammunition explosion. The defeat at Acre forced Bonaparte to retreat to Egypt and effectively ended his efforts to carve an empire in the Middle East. The French general returned to France without his army late in the year, leaving Kléber in command of Egypt.

The Ottoman Empire, with whom Bonaparte had hoped to conduct an alliance once his control of Egypt was complete, was encouraged by the Battle of the Nile to go to war against France. This led to a series of campaigns that slowly sapped the strength from the French army trapped in Egypt. The British victory also encouraged the Austrian Empire and the Russian Empire, both of whom were mustering armies as part of a Second Coalition, which declared war on France in 1799. With the Mediterranean undefended, an Imperial Russian Navy fleet entered the Ionian Sea, while Austrian armies recaptured much of the Italian territory lost to Bonaparte in the previous war. Without their best general and his veterans, the French suffered a series of defeats and it was not until Bonaparte returned to become First Consul that France once again held a position of strength on Continental Europe. In 1801 a British Expeditionary Force defeated the demoralised remains of the French army in Egypt. The Royal Navy used its dominance in the Mediterranean to invade Egypt without the fear of ambush while anchored off the Egyptian coast.

In spite of the overwhelming British victory in the climactic battle, the campaign has sometimes been considered a strategic success for France. Historian Edward Ingram noted that if Nelson had successfully intercepted Bonaparte at sea as ordered, the ensuing battle could have annihilated both the French fleet and the transports. As it was, Bonaparte was free to continue the war in the Middle East and later to return to Europe personally unscathed. The potential of a successful engagement at sea to change the course of history is underscored by the list of French army officers carried aboard the convoy who later formed the core of the generals and marshals under Emperor Napoleon. In addition to Bonaparte himself, Louis-Alexandre Berthier, Auguste de Marmont, Jean Lannes, Joachim Murat, Louis Desaix, Jean Reynier, Antoine-François Andréossy, Jean-Andoche Junot, Louis-Nicolas Davout and Dumas were all passengers on the cramped Mediterranean crossing.

=== Legacy ===
The Battle of the Nile remains one of the Royal Navy's most famous victories, and has remained prominent in the British popular imagination, sustained by its depiction in a large number of cartoons, paintings, poems, and plays. One of the best known poems about the battle is Casabianca, which was written by Felicia Dorothea Hemans in 1826 and gives a fictional account of the actual death of the French Captain Casabianca's son on Orient, i.e. the boy who famously "stood on the burning deck" was French.

Monuments were raised, including Cleopatra's Needle in London. Muhammad Ali of Egypt gave the monument in 1819 in recognition of the battle of 1798 and the campaign of 1801 but Great Britain did not erect it on the Victoria Embankment until 1878. Another memorial, the Nile Clumps near Amesbury, consists of stands of beech trees purportedly planted by Lord Queensbury at the behest of Lady Hamilton and Thomas Hardy after Nelson's death. The trees form a plan of the battle; each clump represents the position of a British or French ship.

On the Hall Place estate, Burchetts Green, Berkshire (now Berkshire College of Agriculture), a double line of oak trees, each tree representing a ship of the opposing fleets, was planted by William East, Baronet, in celebration of the victory. He also constructed a scale-sized pyramid and a life-sized statue of Nelson on the highest point of the estate.

The composer Joseph Haydn had just completed the Missa in Angustiis (mass for troubled times) after Napoleon Bonaparte had defeated the Austrian army in four major battles. The well received news of France's defeat at the Nile however resulted in the mass gradually acquiring the nickname Lord Nelson Mass. The title became indelible when, in 1800, Nelson himself visited the Palais Esterházy, accompanied by his mistress, Lady Hamilton, and may have heard the mass performed.

The Royal Navy commemorated the battle with the ship names HMS Aboukir, HMS Nile and HMS Canopus, and in 1998 commemorated the 200th anniversary of the battle with a visit to Aboukir Bay by the modern frigate HMS Somerset, whose crew laid wreaths in memory of those who lost their lives in the battle.

In John le Carré's novel Smiley's People there is mention of a bar on Battle of the Nile Street named 'The Defeated Frog'.

==== Archaeology ====
Although Nelson biographer Ernle Bradford assumed in 1977 that the remains of Orient "are almost certainly unrecoverable," the first archaeological investigation into the battle began in 1983, when a French survey team under Jacques Dumas discovered the wreck of the French flagship. Franck Goddio later took over the work, leading a major project to explore the bay in 1998. He found that material was scattered over an area 500 metres (550 yd) in diameter. In addition to military and nautical equipment, Goddio recovered a large number of gold and silver coins from countries across the Mediterranean, some from the 17th century. It is likely that these were part of the treasure taken from Malta that was lost in the explosion aboard Orient. In 2000, Italian archaeologist Paolo Gallo led an excavation focusing on ancient ruins on Nelson's Island. It uncovered a number of graves that date from the battle, as well as others buried there during the 1801 invasion. These graves, which included a woman and three children, were relocated in 2005 to a cemetery at Shatby in Alexandria. The reburial was attended by sailors from the modern frigate HMS Chatham and a band from the Egyptian Navy, as well as a descendant of the only identified burial, Commander James Russell.

== Notes ==
1. Note A: Sources often give casualty figures for the battle that vary significantly: Roy and Lesley Adkins list British losses as 218 killed and 677 wounded, French as 5,235 killed or missing and 3,305 captured including approximately 1,000 wounded men. The Dictionnaire des batailles navales franco-anglaises (Dictionary of French-English naval battles) by Jean-Claude Castex, published in 2003, gives British losses as 1,000 casualties or 12% of British personnel engaged and French losses as 1,700 killed, 1,500 wounded and 1,000 prisoners, or 81% of the total French personnel engaged. William Laird Clowes gives precise figures for each British ship, totalling 218 killed and 678 wounded, and quotes French casualty estimates of 2,000 to 5,000, settling on the median average of 3,500. Juan Cole gives 218 British dead and French losses of approximately 1,700 dead, a thousand wounded and 3,305 prisoners, most of whom were returned to Alexandria. Robert Gardiner gives British losses as 218 killed and 617 wounded, French as 1,600 killed and 1,500 wounded. William James gives a precise breakdown of British casualties that totals 218 killed and 678 wounded and also quotes estimates of French losses of 2,000 to 5,000, favouring the lower estimate. John Keegan gives British losses as 208 killed and 677 wounded and French as several thousand dead and 1,000 wounded. Steven Maffeo vaguely records 1,000 British and 3,000 French casualties. Noel Mostert gives British losses of 218 killed and 678 wounded and quotes estimates of French losses between 2,000 and 5,000. Peter Padfield gives British losses of 218 killed and 677 wounded and French as 1,700 killed and approximately 850 wounded. Digby Smith lists British losses of 218 killed and 678 wounded and French as 2,000 killed, 1,100 wounded and 3,900 captured. Oliver Warner gives figures of British losses of 218 killed and 677 wounded and 5,265 French killed or missing, with 3,105 taken prisoner. Almost all of the French prisoners were returned to French-held territory in Egypt during the week following the battle.
2. Note B: The course Audacious took to reach the battle has been the source of some debate: William Laird Clowes states that Audacious passed between Guerrier and Conquerant and anchored in the middle. However, a number of maps of the battle show Audacious's course as rounding the head of the line across Guerrier's bow before turning back to port between the leading French ships. Most sources, including Warner and James, are vague on the subject and do not state one way or another. The cause of this discrepancy is likely the lack of any significant account or report on the action from Gould. Gould has been criticised for the placement of his ship during the opening stages of the battle, as the ships he attacked were already outnumbered, and the following day he had to be repeatedly ordered to rejoin the battle as it spread southwards despite the lack of damage to his ship. Oliver Warner describes him as "brave enough no doubt, but without imagination, or any sense of what was happening in the battle as a whole."

== Bibliography ==
- Adkins, Roy; Adkins, Lesley (2006). The War for All the Oceans. Abacus. ISBN 978-0-349-11916-8.
- Allen, Joseph (1905 [1842]). Battles of the British Navy. Simpkin, Marshall, Hamilton, Kent & Co.
- Baker, Margaret (1995). London Statues and Monuments. Shire Publications Ltd. ISBN 0-7478-0284-X.
- Bradford, Ernle (1999 [1977]). Nelson: The Essential Hero. Wordsworth Military Library. ISBN 1-84022-202-6.
- Castex, Jean-Claude (2003). Dictionnaire des batailles navales franco-anglaises. Les Presses de l'Université Laval. ISBN 2-7637-8061-X.
- Chandler, David (1999 [1993]). Dictionary of the Napoleonic Wars. Wordsworth Military Library. ISBN 1-84022-203-4.
- Clowes, William Laird (1997 [1900]). The Royal Navy, A History from the Earliest Times to 1900, Volume IV. Chatham Publishing. ISBN 1-86176-013-2.
- Cole, Juan (2007). Napoleon's Egypt; Invading the Middle East. Palgrave Macmillan. ISBN 978-1-4039-6431-1.
- Deutsch, Otto Erich (2000). Admiral Nelson and Joseph Haydn. Nelson Society. ISBN 978-0-9537200-0-2.
- Forester, C.S. (2001 [1929]). Nelson. Chatham Publishing. ISBN 1-86176-178-3.
- Gardiner, Robert, ed (2001 [1996]). Nelson Against Napoleon. Caxton Editions. ISBN 1-86176-026-4
- Germani, Ian (January 2000). "Combat and Culture: Imagining the Battle of the Nile". The Northern Mariner X (1): 53–72.
- Ingram, Edward (July 1984). "Illusions of Victory: The Nile, Copenhagen, and Trafalgar Revisited". Military Affairs 48 (3): 140–143.
- James, William (2002 [1827]). The Naval History of Great Britain, Volume 2, 1797–1799. Conway Maritime Press. ISBN 0-85177-906-9.
- Jordan, Gerald; Rogers, Nicholas (July 1989). "Admirals as Heroes: Patriotism and Liberty in Hanoverian England". The Journal of British Studies 28 (3): 201–224.
- Keegan, John (2003). Intelligence in War: Knowledge of the Enemy from Napoleon to Al-Qaeda. Pimlico. ISBN 0-7126-6650-8.
- Maffeo, Steven E. (2000). Most Secret and Confidential: Intelligence in the Age of Nelson. London: Chatham Publishing. ISBN 1-86176-152-X.
- Manning, T. D.; Walker, C. F. (1959). British Warship Names. London: Putnam. OCLC 213798232.
- Mostert, Noel (2007). The Line upon a Wind: The Greatest War Fought at Sea Under Sail 1793–1815. Vintage Books. ISBN 978-0-7126-0927-2.
- Musteen, Jason R. (2011). Nelson's Refuge: Gibraltar in the Age of Napoleon. Naval Investiture Press. ISBN 978-1-59114-545-5.
- Padfield, Peter (2000 [1976]). Nelson's War. Wordsworth Military Library. ISBN 1-84022-225-5.
- Rodger, N.A.M. (2004). The Command of the Ocean. Allan Lane. ISBN 0-7139-9411-8.
- Rose, J. Holland (1924). "Napoleon and Sea Power". Cambridge Historical Journal 1 (2): 138–157.
- Smith, Digby (1998). The Napoleonic Wars Data Book. Greenhill Books. ISBN 1-85367-276-9
- Warner, Oliver (1960). The Battle of the Nile. London: B. T. Batsford.
- Woodman, Richard (2001). The sea warriors: fighting captains and frigate warfare in the age of Nelson. London: Constable. ISBN 1-84119-183-3
