= Jean-Pierre Étienne =

French Navy officer

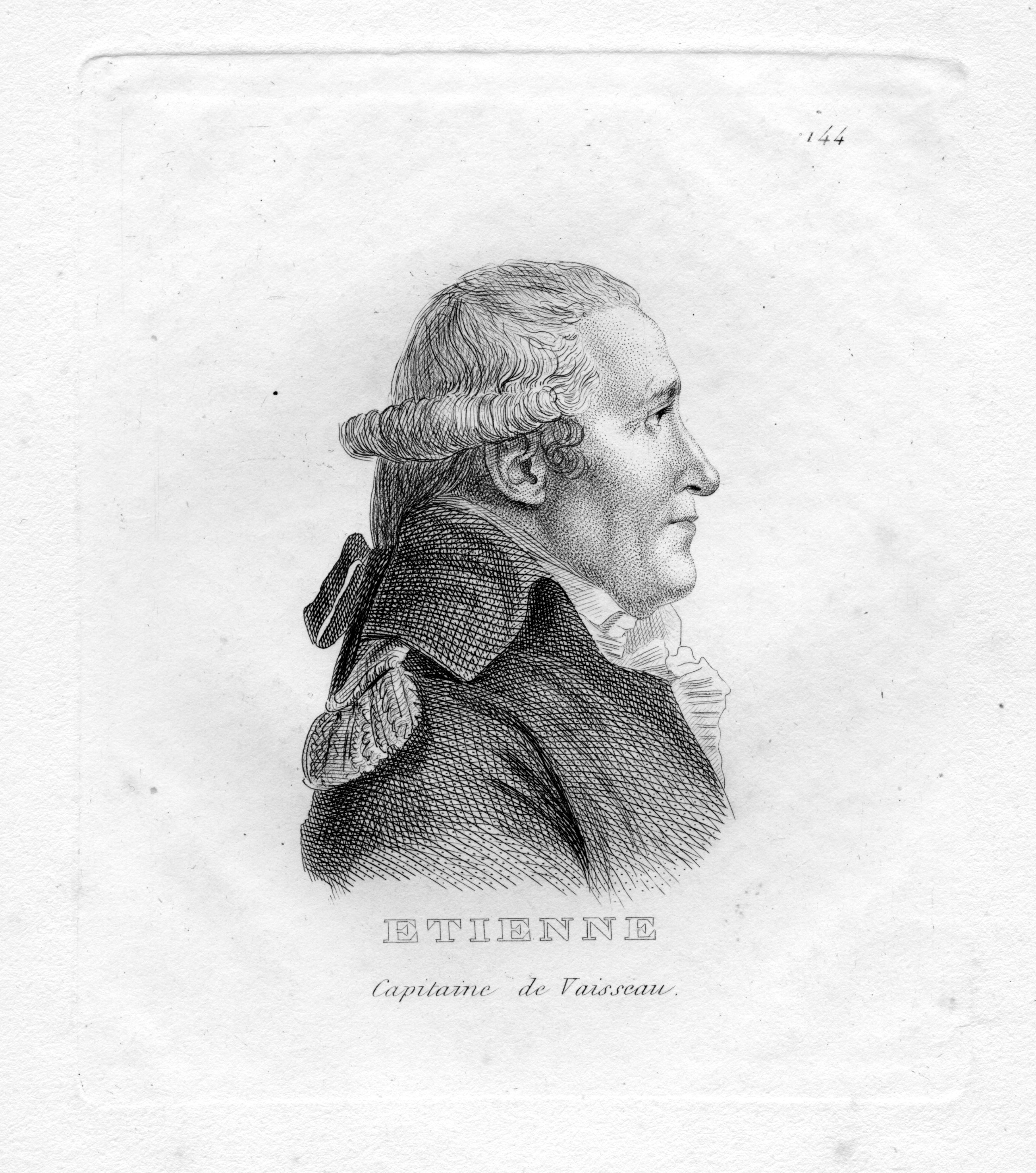

Jean-Pierre Étienne (9 October 1754 in Rochefort – 31 December 1812 on French ship Amsterdam) was a French Navy officer.

== Biography ==
Etienne started his career in the French Royal Navy in 1766 as a cabin boy, serving on a number of ships as an apprentice, a sailor from 1770, a helmsman from 1773, an aid-pilot from 1775, a second pilot from 1776, and a first pilot from 1778.

In 1781, Etienne served on the Illustre, in Suffren's squadron. He took part in the Battle of Trincomalee, and sustained leg injuries at the Battle of Cuddalore.

In 1785, Etienne obtain a commission to captain a merchantman, and engaged in slave trade between Angola and Santo Domingo.

In May 1793, Etienne resumed his naval career with the rank of ensign. He was promoted to lieutenant in December, and to captain in January 1794. He was then appointed to the staff of Admiral Martin on Heureux. Transferred to Sans-Culotte in April, he took part in the battles of Cape Noli and Hyères Islands.

In 1796, he was awarded command of the Guillaume Tell. The next year, he was appointed as captain of Heureux. He took part in the Battle of the Nile, where Heureux had to cut her anchor to avoid the burning wreckage of Orient. Drifting, Heureux ran ashore and was captured. Etienne, severely wounded by a round shot, was taken prisoner.

Released in August 1798, Etienne served in Alexandria before returning to France in 1799. Etienne assumed a variety of commands as gunboats flotilla commander and harbour captain in Corsica and later in Holland.

== Sources and references ==
- Dictionnaire des capitaines de vaisseau de Napoléon, Danielle & Bernard Quintin, SPM, 2003, ISBN 2-901952-42-9
