= The International History Review =

- Discipline: History
- Language: English
- Edited by: Andrew Williams (University of St Andrews)

Publication details
- History: 1979–present
- Publisher: Routledge (United States)
- Frequency: 5/year

Standard abbreviations
- ISO 4: Int. Hist. Rev.

Indexing
- ISSN: 0707-5332 (print); 1949-6540 (web)

Links
- Journal homepage

The International History Review is a peer-reviewed academic journal covering the history of international relations and the history of international thought published by Routledge. It was established in 1978 by Edward Ingram, Gordon Martel and Ian Muggridge; the current editor-in-chief is Alan Dobson (Swansea University).

== Abstracting and indexing ==
The journal is abstracted and indexed in:

- America: History and Life
- Arts & Humanities Citation Index
- Current Contents/Arts & Humanities
- EBSCOHost
- Historical Abstracts
- International Bibliography of the Social Sciences
- International Political Science Abstracts
- JSTOR
- ProQuest databases
- Scopus
