= Oliver Warner =

British naval historian and writer

Oliver Martin Wilson Warner (28 February 1903 – 14 August 1976) was a well-known British naval historian and writer.

== Life and career ==
Warner was born in 1903 and educated at Denstone College and Caius College, Cambridge. In 1926, he succeeded Frank Swinnerton as staff reader at the publishing house of Chatto and Windus. In addition to his work as staff reader he also worked on the company's advertising material. As a young man he made contributions to magazines such as The Spectator and Time and Tide, some of which were later reproduced in his 1947 book Captains and Kings. In 1939, he published an account of his visit to an "unworldly" relative in Canada, entitled Uncle Lawrence. During the Second World War he joined the Admiralty secretariat, initially serving in the Commission and Warrant (C.W.) branch before serving on the war artists advisory committee. He later served as secretary to the naval honours and awards committee.

After the war he became deputy director of publications of the British Council, where he remained until his retirement in 1963. He worked thereafter at Chatto and Windus for another year before concentrating on writing. By the time of his death he had more than twenty books in print. He married twice, first to Dorothea Blanchard who died in 1937, by whom he had one daughter. He was married secondly to Elizabeth Strahan, with whom he had one son and one daughter.

Warner died at his home, Old Manor Cottage, Haslemere, on 14 August 1976. A memorial service was held on 21 October (Trafalgar Day) at St. Lawrence Jewry-next-Guildhall church. As well as family members, the naval historians Professor Christopher Lloyd and Captain Stephen Roskill were in attendance, among others.

== Works ==
- Uncle Lawrence (1939)
- Captains and Kings. A Group of Miniatures (1947)
- An Introduction to British Marine Painting (1948)
- The English Teapot (1948)
- Tea in Festival (1951)
- The Crown Jewels (1951) a "King Penguin" book
- Captain Marryat: A Rediscovery (1953)
- Battle Honours of the Royal Navy (1956)
- Portrait of Lord Nelson (1958)
- Trafalgar (1959) Batsford "British Battles" series
- Emma Hamilton and Sir William (1960)
- The Battle of the Nile (1960) Batsford "British Battles" series
- The Glorious First of June (1961) Batsford "British Battles" series
- Captain Cook and the South Pacific (1963)
- Great Sea Battles (1963)
- Nelson and the Age of Fighting Sail (1963)
- Nelson's Battles (1965)
- Portsmouth and the Royal Navy (1965)
- Cunningham of Hyndhope: Admiral of the Fleet (1967)
- Marshal Mannerheim and the Finns (1967)
- The Navy (1968)
- The Life and Letters of Vice-Admiral Collingwood (1968)
- Nelson's Last Diary and the Prayer Before Trafalgar (1971) a facsimile with introduction
- With Wolfe to Quebec (1972)
- Great Battle Fleets (1973)
- The Life-boat Service: A History of the Royal National Life-Boat Institution, 1824-1974 (1974)
- The British Navy: A Concise History (1975)
- Great Naval Actions of the British Navy 1588-1807 and 1916 (1976)
- Fighting Sail: Three Hundred Years of Warfare at Sea (1979)

== Bibliography ==
- "Deaths". Deaths. The Times. No. 59785. London. 18 August 1976. col C, p. 22.
- "Deaths". Deaths. The Times. No. 59841. London. 22 October 1976. col D, p. 18.
- "Mr Oliver Warner: Distinguished naval historian". Obituaries. The Times. No. 59785. London. 18 August 1976. col F, p. 14.
