= Claude-Jean Martin =

French Navy officer

Claude-Jean Martin (14 March 1752 in Toulon – 6 June 1827 in Toulon) was a French Navy officer.

== Biography ==
Born to a family of sailors, Martin joined the French Royal Navy in 1767. He served in the Mediterranean against Barbary pirates.

He later served as a pilot aboard the Fantasque, taking part in the campaigns of Admiral d'Estaing in the American War of Independence. He later received command of a coastguard sloop, and received an honour sword after fighting a British privateer on 6 October 1780.

Promoted to lieutenant in January 1792, Martin served on Junon before taking command of the corvette Rossignol in 1796. In June, he was promoted to commander, and successively captained the frigates Fauvette and Sérieuse.

On Sérieuse, Martin took part in the Battle of the Nile, where he stood against the much stronger HMS Orion. Sérieuse was sunk and foundered, while Martin was rescued by the British and taken prisoner to Gibraltar.

Released in December 1798, Martin was tasked with teaching duties. In 1801, he took command of the Indivisible. In 1803, he captained the Swiftsure.

In 1808 and 1809, he commanded the frigate Incorruptible.

Martin retired in 1813 after having served ashore.

== Sources and references ==
- Dictionnaire des capitaines de vaisseau de Napoléon, Danielle & Bernard Quintin, SPM, 2003, ISBN 2-901952-42-9
