= French ship Heureux =

Ship of the line of the French Navy

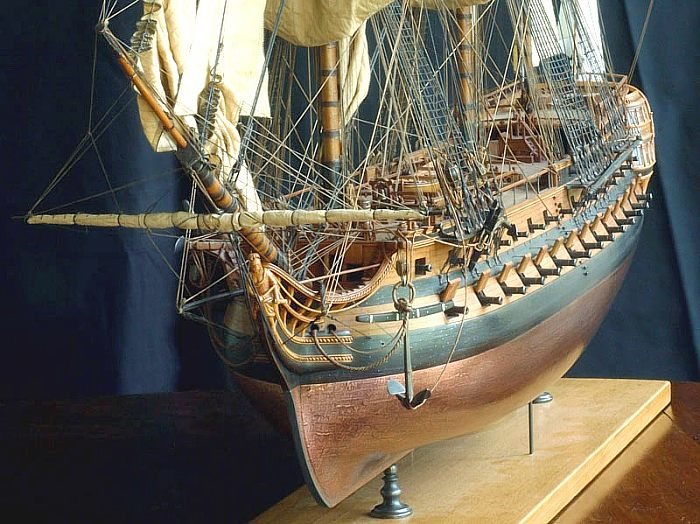
- A 74-gun French ship of the line similar to Heureux

History

France
- Name: Heureux
- Namesake: "Merry"
- Ordered: 15 February 1782
- Builder: Toulon
- Laid down: 12 May 1782
- Launched: 19 December 1782
- In service: April 1783
- Captured: 2 August 1798
- Fate: Burnt 29 August 1798

General characteristics
- Class & type: Centaure-class ship of the line
- Displacement: 3,010 tonneaux
- Tons burthen: 1,530 port tonneaux
- Length: 54.6 m (179 ft 2 in)
- Beam: 14.3 m (46 ft 11 in)
- Draught: 7 m (23 ft 0 in)
- Propulsion: Sail
- Armament: 74 guns

Heureux was a Centaure-class 74-gun ship of the line of the French Navy.

Was captured in Toulon by the British in August 1793 but was retaken by the French on December in the same year. She cruised in the Mediterranean in 1794 and 1795.

Under Captain Jean-Pierre Etienne, she took part in the Expedition to Egypt, and in the Battle of the Nile. The first ship to spot the British fleet on 1 August, Heureux fought the next day and was forced to strike her colours. Too badly damaged for repairs, she was burnt on 29 August 1798.
