= Edward Ingram (historian) =

Anglo-Canadian historian and editor

Edward Roger Ingram Ellis (born in Calcutta, India) was an Anglo-Canadian historian of the British Empire, long-time former editor of the International History Review, and emeritus professor at Simon Fraser University. Having obtained his BA and MA degrees from Balliol College, Oxford, Ingram went on to receive his PhD in international history from the London School of Economics, completing his doctoral dissertation under the direction of Hilda Lee and Elie Kedourie. Most of Ingram's scholarly publishing focused on the so-called Great Game, the imperial rivalry between the British and Russian Empires in Central Asia. In 1966 he joined the faculty of Simon Fraser University in Burnaby, British Columbia, Canada. In 1978 he was made Professor of Imperial History at SFU and became editor of the International History Review, holding the former position until his retirement in 2003. He remained Professor of Imperial History Emeritus at SFU until his passing in 2022.

Ingram died in Carterton, New Zealand on March 15, 2022.

== Selected bibliography ==
Books

- Two Views of British India: The Private Correspondence of Mr. Dundas and Lord Wellesley, 1798–1801 (Editor, 1970)
- The Beginning of the Great Game in Asia, 1828–1834 (1979)
- Commitment to Empire: Prophecies of the Great Game in Asia 1797–1800 (1981)
- In Defence of British India: Great Britain in the Middle East, 1774–1842 (1984)
- National and International Politics in the Middle East: Essays in Honour of Elie Kedourie (Editor, 1986, contributing "Introduction: Six Variations on a Theme," pp. 1–15, and a "How and How not to Negotiate with Iran," pp. 31–53.)
- Britain's Persian Connection, 1798–1828: Prelude to the Great Game in Asia (1992)
- Eastern Questions in the Nineteenth Century: Collected Essays (Editor, 1993)
- Anglo-Ottoman Encounters in the Age of Revolution (Editor, 1993)
- Empire Building and Empire Builders (1995)
- The British Empire as a World Power (2001)

Chapters in books

- 'India and the North-West Frontier: The First Afghan War' in Great Powers and Little Wars: The Limits of Power, Elizabeth Jane Essington & Hamish Ion (eds) (New York: Praegar) 1993.

Journal articles

- 'The Disguising and Timing of Conquest', Indo-British Review, 1994.
- 'The Geopolitics of the First British Expedition to Egypt - IV: Occupation and Withdrawal, 1801-1803," Middle Eastern Studies, 31(2)(1995), pp. 317-346
- 'The Geopolitics of the First British Expedition to Egypt - III: The Red Sea Campaign, 1800-1801', Middle Eastern Studies, 31(1)(1994), pp. 146-169
- 'The Geopolitics of the First British Expedition to Egypt- II: The Mediterranean Campaign, 1800-1801', Middle Eastern Studies, 30(4)(1994), pp. 699-723
- 'The Geopolitics of the British British Expedition to Egypt - I: The Cabinet Crisis of September 1800', Middle Eastern Studies, 30(3)(1994), pp. 435-460.
- 'Timing and Explaining Aggression: Wellesley, Clive and the Carnatic, 1795-1801', Indo-British Review, 21(2)(1994), pp. 104-115.
- "The Role of the Duke of Wellington in the Great Game in Asia, 1826-1842," Indica, xxv (1988), pp. 131–142.
- "Where and for what shall we fight?" International History Review, vii (1985), pp. 271–276.
- "Illusions of Victory: The Nile, Copenhagen and Trafalgar Revisited", Military Affairs, 48(3)(1984), pp. 140–143.
- "Approaches to the Great Game in Asia," Middle Eastern Studies, xvii (1982), pp. 449–457.
- "A Scare of Seaborne Invasion: The Royal Navy at the Strait of Hormuz, 1807-1808," Military Affairs, 46(2)(1982), pp. 64–68.
- "Family and Faction in the Great Game in Asia: The Struggle over the Persian Mission, 1828-1835," Middle Eastern Studies, xvii(1981), pp. 291–309.
- "Great Britain's Great Game: An Introduction," International History Review, ii (1980), pp. 160–171.
- "From Trade to Empire in the Near East--III: The Uses of the British Residency at Baghdad, 1797-1807," Middle Eastern Studies, 14(3)(1978), pp. 277–306.
- "From Trade to Empire in the Near East--II: The Repercussions of the Incident at Nakhilu in 1804," Middle Eastern Studies, 14(2)(1978), pp. 182–204.
- "From Trade to Empire in the Near East--I: The End of the Spectre of the Overland Trade," Middle Eastern Studies, 14(1)(1978), pp. 3–21.
- "Lord Mulgrave's Proposals for the Reconstruction of Europe in 1804," Historical Journal, 19(2)(1976), pp. 511–520.
- "A Strategic Dilemma: The Defence of India, 1874-1914," Militarqeschichtliche Mitteilunqen, xvi (1976), pp. 215–224.
- "The Rules of the Game: A Commentary on the Defence of British India, 1798-1829," Journal of Imperial and Commonwealth History, 3(2)(Jan. 1975), pp. 257–279.
- "An Aspiring Buffer State: Anglo-Persian Relations in the Third Coalition, 1804-1807," Historical Journal, xvi (1973), pp. 507–533.
- "A Preview of the Great Game in Asia--IV: British Agents in the Near East in the War of the Second Coalition, 1798-1801," Middle Eastern Studies, 10(1)(1974), pp. 15–35.
- "A Preview of the Great Game in Asia-III: The Origins of the British Expedition to Egypt in 1801," Middle Eastern Studies, 9(3)(1973), pp. 296–314.
- "A Preview of the Great Game in Asia--II: The Proposal of an Alliance with Afghanistan, 1798-1800," Middle Eastern Studies, 9(2)(1973), pp. 157–174.
- "A Preview of the Great Game in Asia--I: The British Occupation of Perim and Aden in 1799," 'Middle Eastern Studies, 9(1)(1973), pp. 3-18.
- "The Role of the Indian Army at the End of the Eighteenth Century," Military History Journal, 2(6)(Dec. 1973), pp. 216-222.
- "A Further Confidential Letter from Wellesley to Dundas," Journal of Indian History, xlix (1972), pp. 15-20.
- "British Strategy and High Command, 1783-1819,"Militargeschichtliche Mitteilunqen, xii (1972), pp. 165-172.
- "In Defence of British India II--A Further Examination of the Mission of Mountstuart Elphinstone to Kabul," Journal of Indian History, 49(#145-147)(1971) pp. 57-78.
- "In Defence of British India I--The Invasion Scare of 1798", Journal of Indian History, 48(3)(#144)(1970) pp. 565–584.

== See also ==
- British Empire
- British Raj
- Company rule in India
- Elie Kedourie
- Great Game
- Richard Wellesley, 1st Marquess Wellesley
