= HMS Strombolo (1797) =

History

Great Britain
- Name: Leander
- Builder: Thomas Hearn, North Shields
- Fate: Sold 1797

Great Britain
- Acquired: April 1797 by purchase
- Fate: Broken up 1809

General characteristics
- Class & type: Bomb-vessel
- Tons burthen: 32364/94 (bm)
- Length: Overall:92 ft 5 in (28.2 m); Keel:75 ft 3 in (22.9 m)
- Beam: 28 ft 5 1/4 in (8.7 m)
- Depth of hold: 12 ft 6 1/2 in (3.8 m)
- Complement: 67
- Armament: Upper deck:4 × 68-pounder carronades; QD:4 × 18-pounder carronades; Fc:2 × 18-pounder carronades; Mortars:2 × 10-inch

HMS Strombolo was launched in 1795 at North Shields as the mercantile Leander. The Royal Navy purchased her in 1797, converted her to a bomb-vessel, and renamed her. She participated in the capture of Malta in 1800. The Navy laid her up in 1802 and had her broken up in 1809.

== Royal Navy ==
Strombolo was commissioned in August 1797 under Commander John Broughton.

However, the bomb-vessel Strombolo was reported already to have participated in a bombardment of Cadiz on 5 July 1797. British casualties were light, with none of the three bomb vessels suffering any.

On 28 November 1798 HMS Santa Dorothea, operating in company with HMS Perseus, Strombolo, and HMS Bulldog captured the 16-gun Spanish Navy brig San Leon on the Lisbon station. She was armed with sixteen 6-pounder guns and had a crew of 82 men.

Strombolo sailed for the Mediterranean in October 1799.

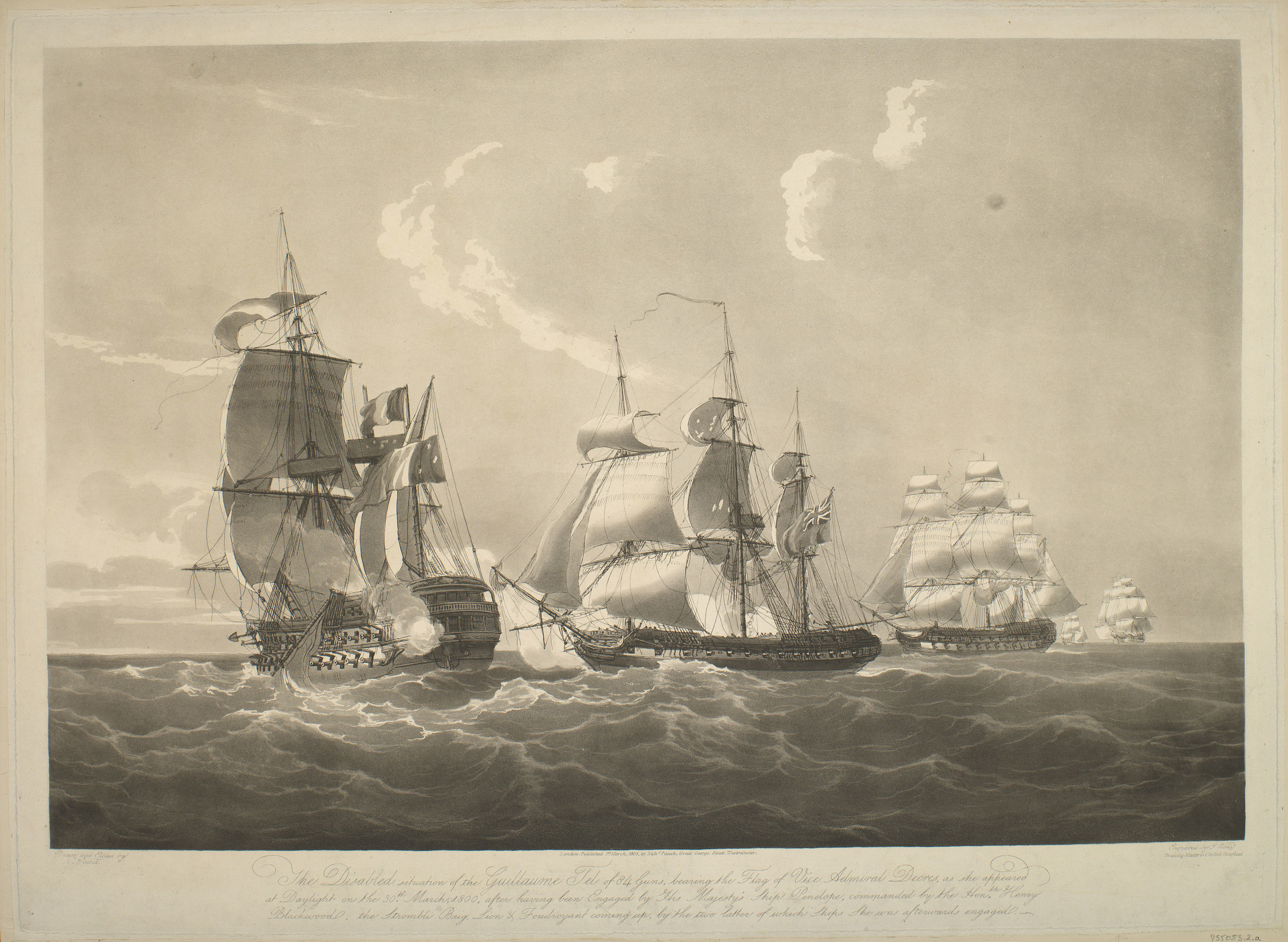
The Disabled situation of the Guillaume Tell of 84 Guns, Stromboli shown third from left or right. Malta, 1800

In the action of 31 March 1800, a British squadron consisting of the ships of the line Foudroyant and Lion, frigate Penelope, brigs Minorca and Vincejo, and bomb vessel Strombolo captured the French ship of the line Guillaume Tell. Although all six vessels of the British squadron shared the prize money, only the two ships of the line and the frigate actually engaged in the battle.

Because she was part of the British squadron supporting the capture of Malta, Strombolo shared in the prize money for the capture on 30 March 1800 of Guilaume Tell.

In May Strombolo was present at the capture of Malta.

On 25 June, Success captured the French aviso Intreprenante (or Entreprenante). The next day Success captured another aviso, Redoutable, with the same armament, establishment, and mission as Intreprenante. Unfortunately for Success, she had to share the prize money with a large number of other British warships, including Strombolo. (Note: A first-class share of the headmoney was £4 11s 2d; a fifth-class share was worth 6d. Because Success and Vincejo, among others, had been overpaid on the prize money for the two French vessels' hulls and cargoes, £2 13s 8d for a first-class share and 3d for a fifth-class share were deducted from this payment.)

The French frigates Diane (or Dianne) and Justice escaped from Valletta Harbour on 24 August. Success, Northumberland, and Genereux captured Diane, which the British took into service as HMS Niobe, but Justice escaped. As part of the blockading squadron, Strombolo shared in the prize money for Diane. (Note: The British captured Justice at the fall of Alexandria on 2 September 1801; in the division of the spoils, the Ottoman navy received Justice.)

Malta surrendered on 5 September. Strombolo was among the many vessels and Army units that shared the prize money.

Strombolo received a share of the prize money for the transport Venus, wrecked off Minorca and salvaged on 20 October with the aid of the frigate HMS Pearl, 18-gun sloop Lutine, Strombolo, and the 6-gun tender Alexander. On 31 October, Pearl with Lutine, Strombolo, the 20-gun corvette Bonne Citoyenne, and the 12-gun polacca Transfer, took transport Fowler from Port Mahon.

In January 1801 Commander Anthony Thompson replaced Broughton. In May Commander Edward Brown replaced Thompson. Strombolo returned to Portsmouth on 3 June 1802 and was laid up at Deptford.

== Fate ==
Strombolo was broken up in Deptford Dockyard July 1809.
