= Action of 31 March 1800 =

Naval battle of the War of the Second Coalition

- Part of the War of the Second Coalition
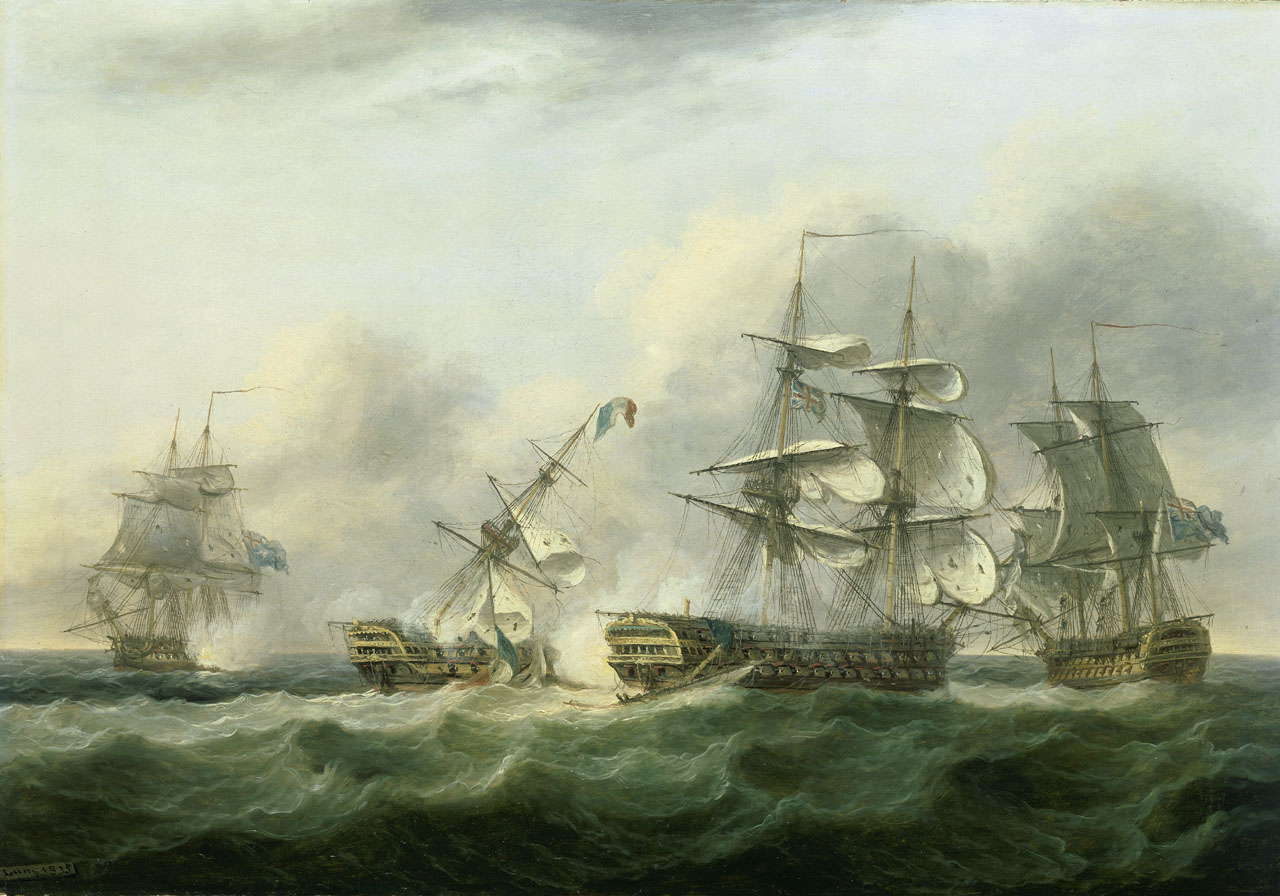
- The Capture of the ‘Guillaume Tell’, 30 March 1800; Thomas Luny, 1835
Date	31 March 1800
Location	Malta Channel, Mediterranean Sea 36.19°N 14.62°E
Result	British victory

Belligerents
Great Britain	France

Commanders and leaders
Manley Dixon	Denis Decrès (surrendered)

Strength
2 ships of the line 1 frigate 2 brigs 1 bomb vessel	1 ship of the line

Casualties and losses
18 killed 104 wounded	200 killed or wounded 1 ship of the line captured

The action of 31 March 1800 was a naval engagement of the War of the Second Coalition fought between a Royal Navy squadron and a French Navy ship of the line off Malta in the Mediterranean Sea. By March 1800 Valletta, the Maltese capital, had been under siege for eighteen months and food supplies were severely depleted, a problem exacerbated by the interception and defeat of a French replenishment convoy in mid-February. In an effort to simultaneously obtain help from France and reduce the number of personnel maintained in the city, the naval commander on the island, Counter-Admiral Pierre-Charles Villeneuve, ordered his subordinate Counter-Admiral Denis Decrès to put to sea with the large ship of the line Guillaume Tell, which had arrived in the port shortly before the siege began in September 1798. Over 900 men were carried aboard the ship, which was to sail for Toulon under cover of darkness on 30 March.

The British had maintained a blockade off Malta since the beginning of the siege, ostensibly led by Rear-Admiral Lord Nelson, who by March 1800 was defying a direct order from his superior officer Lord Keith by remaining in Palermo with his lover Emma, Lady Hamilton. In his absence the blockade was under the command of Captain Manley Dixon of HMS Lion and Nelson's flag captain Sir Edward Berry, who were notified of Decrès' departure by the patrolling frigate HMS Penelope and gave chase. The large ship of the line was initially attacked only by Penelope, which manoeuvered around Guillaume Tell's stern, causing severe damage and delaying the French ship sufficiently for Berry to bring his squadron into action. Despite being heavily outnumbered, Decrès continued to fight for more than three hours, fighting off two British ships but ultimately unable to resist the combined weight of Berry's attacks. Casualties and damage were severe on both sides, and the defiance of the French ship was celebrated in both countries as a brave defence against overwhelming odds.

== Background ==
In May 1798, a French fleet under General Napoleon Bonaparte crossed the Mediterranean Sea, sailing for Egypt. Pausing at Malta on 9 June, Bonaparte landed soldiers and seized the island leaving a sizeable French garrison at Valletta under General Claude-Henri Belgrand de Vaubois while the rest of the fleet continued on to Alexandria. After the successful landing in Egypt, Bonaparte marched inland at the head of his army. The fleet anchored in Aboukir Bay to support the troops ashore and was surprised and almost completely destroyed on 1 August by a British fleet under Rear-Admiral Sir Horatio Nelson. Only two ships of the line and two frigates escaped the Battle of the Nile from the 17 French ships that participated in the action. Of the survivors, the ship of the line Généreux sailed for Corfu while Guillaume Tell, under Counter-Admiral Pierre-Charles Villeneuve, reached Malta with the two frigates.

When Villeneuve arrived at Malta in September 1798, the island was already in turmoil: the dissolution of the Roman Catholic Church on the island under French rule had been highly unpopular with the Maltese population, who forced the French garrison to retreat into the fortress of Valletta on 2 September. By the start of October, British and Portuguese troops had supplemented the Maltese irregulars, while a naval squadron watched Valletta harbour, to prevent any French effort to resupply and reinforce the garrison. Although small quantities of material reached Valletta from France in early 1799, by the start of 1800 no ship had arrived for more than seven months, and the garrison was near starvation. In an effort to resupply the garrison, the French sent a convoy from Toulon in February 1800, but the ships were intercepted off Malta by a squadron under Nelson on 17 February and in the ensuing battle its flagship Généreux was captured and Counter-Admiral Jean-Baptiste Perrée was killed.

Without Perrée's supplies, the garrison faced continued food shortages, and by March Vaubois and Villeneuve decided to send an urgent request for support to France. For this operation they chose the 80-gun Guillaume Tell under Captain Saulnier, partly because the condition and size of the ship enabled Vaubois to embark over 900 men aboard, many of whom were sick or wounded. Counter-Admiral Denis Decrès had command of the ship and Vaubois and Villeneuve confirmed the date of departure for 30 March. While the French prepared this expedition, the British maintained their blockade, although without their commander. Nelson, in defiance of specific orders from his commanding officer Lord Keith, had retired to Palermo on Sicily to be with Emma, Lady Hamilton, the wife of the British ambassador Sir William Hamilton with whom Nelson was conducting an adulterous affair. In his absence, command had passed to Captain Sir Thomas Troubridge on HMS Culloden and then to Captain Manley Dixon on HMS Lion.

== Battle ==
At 23:00 on 30 March, with a strong wind from the south, Guillaume Tell sailed from Valletta, Decrès hoping to use the cover of darkness to escape the British blockade. Dixon had deployed his ships around the island, with Valletta watched by the frigate HMS Penelope under Captain Henry Blackwood. At 23:55, Blackwood's lookouts spotted Guillaume Tell and the captain gave chase, ordering the brig HMS Minorca under Commander George Miller to convey the message to Dixon, whose ships were just visible in the distance. Blackwood also attempted to signal his discovery to his commanding officer as Penelope gave chase.

Blackwood rapidly gained on the ship of the line and by 00:30 the frigate was within range, pulling up under the stern of Guillaume Tell and beginning a steady fire to which Decrès could respond with only his stern-chasers, light cannon situated in the stern of the ship. Decrès recognised that if he stopped to engage Penelope then the rest of Berry's squadron, visible on the horizon to the south, would soon overwhelm him. He therefore continued sailing to the northeast, hoping his heavy ship of the line could outrun the light and speedy frigate. However, Penelope was too fast, and Blackwood handled his ship with considerable skill, managing to pass Decrès' stern repeatedly and pour several raking broadsides into the French ship.

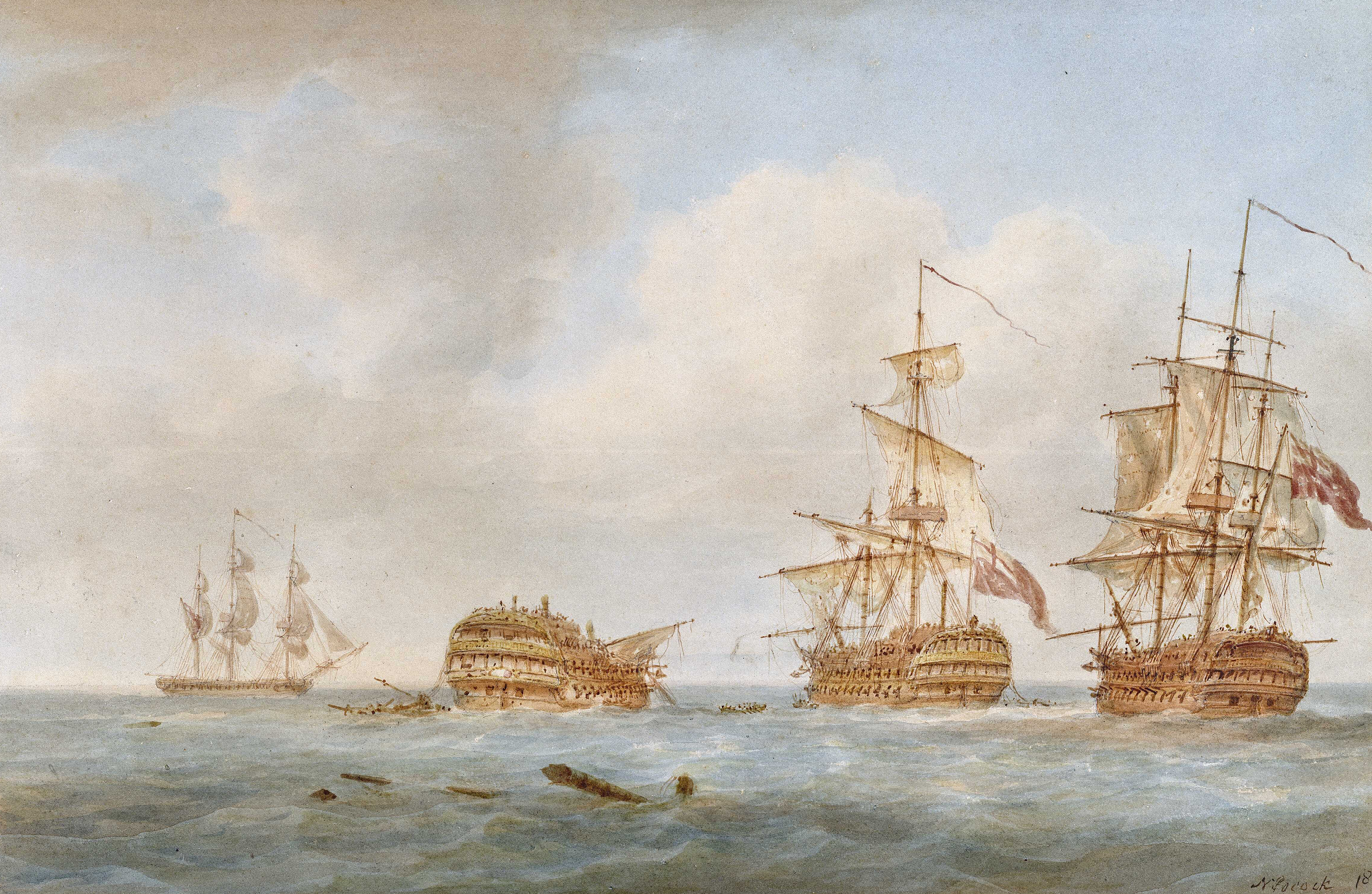
The capture of the 'Guillaume Tell', 31 March 1800 by Nicholas Pocock

Blackwood's attack was so successful that by dawn on 31 March Guillaume Tell had lost its main and mizzen topmasts and its main yard, considerably reducing the speed at which Decrès could travel. The French ship had also suffered heavy casualties in the exchange, but Penelope had lost only one man killed and three wounded, and was almost undamaged. British reinforcements were now arriving from the south: the 64-gun HMS Lion under Captain Dixon had received Minorca's warning at 01:00 and immediately sailed in pursuit, sending the brig on to Captain Sir Edward Berry in HMS Foudroyant, who lay some distance to leeward. By 05:00, Dixon was close enough to engage, passing between Penelope and Guillaume Tell and firing a triple-shotted broadside into the port side of the French ship. Shooting ahead of the now sluggish Guillaume Tell, Lion crossed its opponent's bows and shot away the jib boom, allowing Dixon to maintain a position across the bow, raking the French ship from one end while Penelope did the same to the other. During these manoeuvres, Dixon's ship had briefly become entangled with Guillaume Tell's rigging, and two determined efforts to board the British ship had been driven off as the ships were disentangled.

For half an hour, Lion continued to fire into the larger Guillaume Tell, but Dixon was unable to keep his ship completely out of range of the French broadsides and by 05:30 the subsequent damage showed an effect, Lion dropping back and falling behind the French vessel, although remaining within range alongside Penelope. At 06:00, Guillaume Tell came under attack for the third time, when Berry himself caught up with the battling ships in Foudroyant and pulled along the starboard broadside of the French ship of the line. Berry hailed Decrès to demand his surrender, and accompanied the demand with a triple-shotted broadside, to which Decrès responded with fire from his own guns. Foudroyant was flying a full set of sails and therefore suffered severe damage to its rigging in the opening exchange, the additional speed provided by this rig forcing Foudroyant to move ahead of the French vessel. After working back alongside Guillaume Tell, Berry recommenced fire that rapidly tore away much of the remaining French rigging, allowing Lion and Penelope to return to the battle while Foudroyant dropped back to make urgent repairs.

By 06:30 the badly outnumbered French ship had lost both its main and mizen masts, Foudroyant returning to the battle in time to collapse the foremast by 08:00. At 08:20, with no means of making sail and with wreckage obscuring most of his gun decks, Decrès surrendered to spare any further, fruitless, loss of life. His ship was in danger: the lack of masts and strong winds caused it to roll so severely that the lower deck gun ports had to be closed to prevent the ship from foundering. Casualties on the French ship numbered more than 200, from a crew of over 900, with both Decrès and Saulnier badly wounded. British losses were lighter, with eight killed and 64 wounded, including Berry, in Foudroyant, eight killed and 38 wounded in Lion and one killed and three wounded (one fatally) in Penelope. Damage was unevenly spread, Foudroyant suffering most severely, with the hull and all masts damaged, the mizzenmast so badly that it collapsed at approximately 12:00, wounding five more men. Lion was badly hit, although not so severely as Foudroyant while Penelope was only lightly damaged in the masts and rigging. The battle, which had begun within sight of Malta, had concluded roughly 21 nmi (39 km) south-west of Cape Passaro on Sicily.

== Aftermath ==
Both Foudroyant and Lion were too battered to provide an effective tow to the dismasted French ship, and as a result Penelope was left to bring the shattered Guillaume Tell into Syracuse on Sicily. Eventually the ship was repaired sufficiently for the journey to Britain, and there was added to the Royal Navy under the name HMS Malta. Malta was, with HMS Tonnant captured two years earlier at the Nile, the most powerful third rate in the British fleet, and served for many years, participating at the Battle of Cape Finisterre in 1805.

The British officers were praised for the capture of Guillaume Tell, the last surviving French ship of the line to escape the Battle of the Nile: Nelson, who by his absence had "missed what would indeed have been the crowning glory to his Mediterranean career", wrote to Berry that "Your conduct and character in the late glorious occasion stamps your fame beyond the reach of envy." Despite Nelson's praise however, Berry in particular came in for subsequent criticism, especially from the historian William James, who wrote in his 1827 history of the conflict that:

"Had the Foudroyant, single-handed, met the Guillaume-Tell, the combat would have been between two of the most powerful ships that had ever so met; and, although the Foudroyant's slight inferiority of force, being chiefly in number of men, was not that of which a British captain would complain, still the chances were equal, that the Guillaume-Tell, so gallantly manned, and so ably commanded, came off the conqueror."

— William James, 1827,

James instead attributed most of the praise for the victory to Blackwood and Dixon, whose ships were heavily outmatched by Guillaume Tell, but who successfully pressed their attacks with the intention of delaying the French retreat. He also highly praised Decrès for his conduct in the engagement, stating that "A more heroic defence than that of the Guillaume-Tell is not to be found among the records of naval actions". First Consul Napoleon Bonaparte reached a similar conclusion, and when Decrès was exchanged soon after the battle he was presented with armes d'honneur, later converted to membership of the Légion d'honneur. He was also given the position of maritime prefect of the Biscay port of Lorient.

Aboard Guillaume Tell, the British found evidence of the severity of the food shortages in Valletta: "the only thing found in La Guillaume Tell was the leg of a mule, hung for safety and his especial use of the admiral's stern-galley". News of the capture of Guillaume Tell was immediately passed to Vaubois by the British besiegers, along with a demand that he surrender the island. The French general, despite dwindling food supplies, refused, stating "Cette place est en trop bon état, et je suis moi-même trop jaloux de bien servir mon pays et de conserver mon honneur, pour écouter vos propositions." ("This place is in too good a situation, and I am too conscious of the service of my country and my honour, to listen to your proposals"). Despite Vaubois' defiance, the garrison was rapidly starving, and although the French commander resisted until 4 September, he was eventually forced to surrender Valletta and all of its military equipment to the British.

== Bibliography ==
- Adkins, Roy & Lesley (2006). The War for All the Oceans. Abacus. ISBN 0-349-11916-3.
- Bradford, Ernle (1999) [1977]. Nelson: The Essential Hero. Wordsworth Military Library. ISBN 1-84022-202-6.
- Clowes, William Laird (1997) [1900]. The Royal Navy, A History from the Earliest Times to 1900, Volume IV. Chatham Publishing. ISBN 1-86176-013-2.
- Gardiner, Robert, ed. (2001) [1996]. Nelson Against Napoleon. Caxton Editions. ISBN 1-86176-026-4.
- James, William (2002) [1827]. The Naval History of Great Britain, Volume 2, 1797–1799. Conway Maritime Press. ISBN 0-85177-906-9.
- James, William (2002) [1827]. The Naval History of Great Britain, Volume 3, 1800–1805. Conway Maritime Press. ISBN 0-85177-907-7.
- Mostert, Noel (2007). The Line upon a Wind: The Greatest War Fought at Sea Under Sail 1793 – 1815. Vintage Books. ISBN 978-0-7126-0927-2.
- Woodman, Richard (2001). The Sea Warriors. Constable Publishers. ISBN 1-84119-183-3.
