= Manley Dixon =

Royal Navy Admiral (1757–1837)

Admiral Sir Manley Dixon KCB
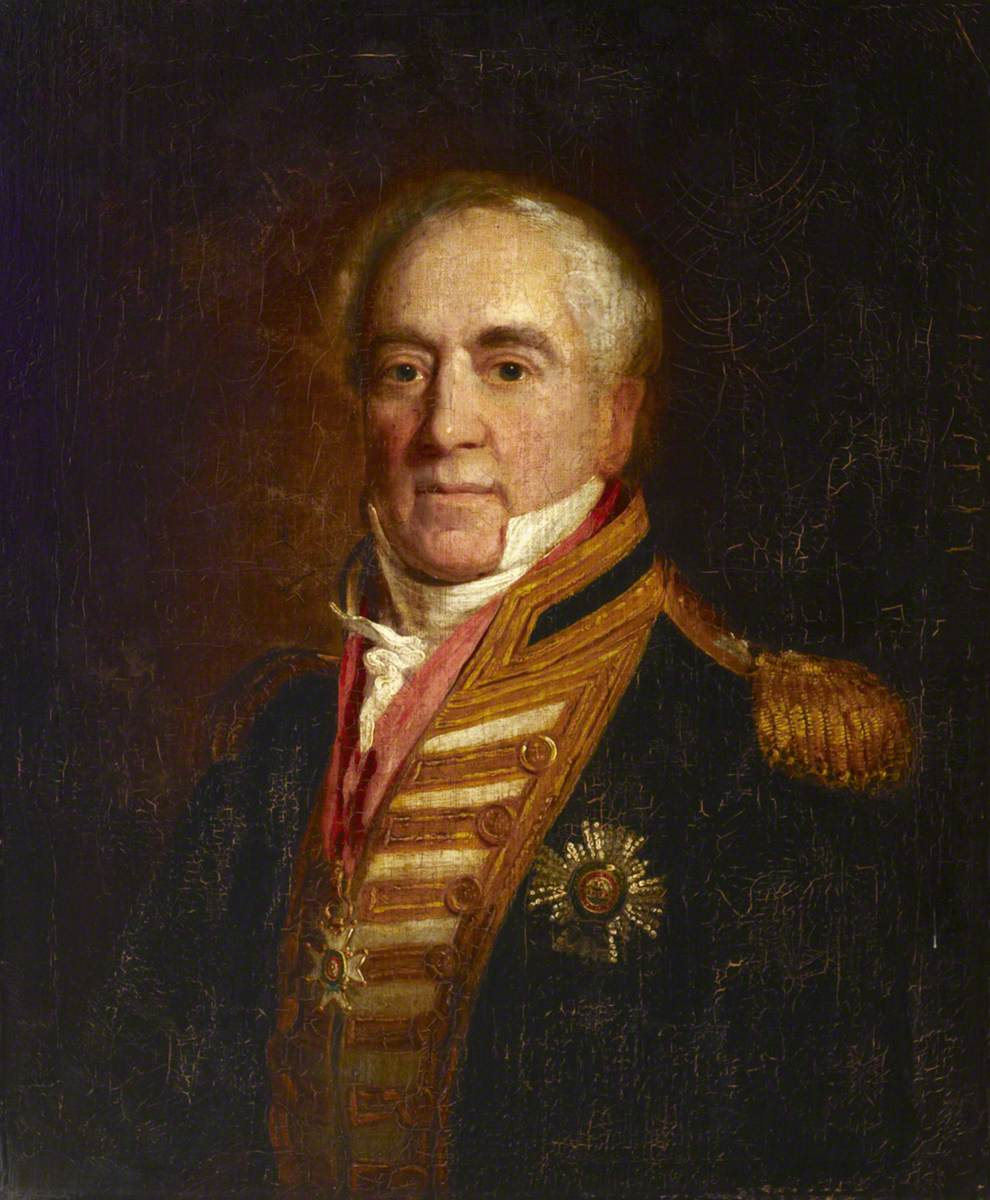
- Dixon as a vice-admiral
- Born: January 3, 1757
- Died: February 8, 1837 (aged 80); Exmouth, Devon
- Military career
- Allegiance: United Kingdom
- Branch: Royal Navy
- Commands: South America Station; Plymouth Command
- Conflicts: American Revolutionary War; French Revolutionary Wars; Capture of Santa Dorothea; Siege of Malta; Capture of Guillaume Tell; Napoleonic Wars
- Awards: Knight Commander of the Order of the Bath

Admiral Sir Manley Dixon, KCB (3 January 1757 – 8 February 1837) was a prominent Royal Navy officer during the late eighteenth and early nineteenth centuries. Born into a military family in the late 1750s or early 1760s, Dixon joined the Navy and served as a junior officer in the American Revolutionary War, gaining an independent command in the last year of the war. Promoted to captain seven years later, Dixon then served in the French Revolutionary Wars in the Channel Fleet and off Ireland until 1798, when he gained command of the 64-gun HMS Lion with the Mediterranean Fleet. Employed in the blockade of Cartagena, on 15 July 1798 Lion fought four Spanish frigates and successfully captured one, Santa Dorothea. Transferred to the Siege of Malta later the same year, Dixon remained off the island for two years, capturing the French ship of the line Guillaume Tell at the action of 31 March 1800. After the Peace of Amiens, Dixon remained in various active commands but saw no action and later retired, advancing to a Knight Commander of the Order of the Bath and a full admiral.

== Life ==
According to various sources, Manley Dixon was born in either 1757 or 1760 into a military family: his brother George W. Dixon became a British Army Major-General serving with the Royal Artillery. Joining the Navy at a young age, Dixon served throughout the American Revolutionary War and by 1782 was a commander with the sloop HMS Jamaica in the Caribbean and the following year took over HMS Tobago. He saw little service during the peace of 1783–1793, although in 1790 he was promoted to post captain. His daughter Frances Elizabeth Dixon was born in 1784 and his son Manley Hall Dixon was born in 1786. In 1793 Dixon took command of the sixth rate HMS Porcupine off Ireland and later moved to the frigate HMS Espion in the Channel Fleet. In 1798, Dixon sailed in the 64-gun ship of the line HMS Lion for the Mediterranean Fleet under Vice-Admiral Earl St Vincent based in the Tagus. There he was assigned to the blockade of Cartagena and on 15 July 1798 fought an action against four Spanish frigates, successfully dividing the squadron and capturing the Santa Dorothea.

Later in the year, Lion was attached to the squadron blockading Valletta during the Siege of Malta, remaining on the station for two years. In March 1800, the French ship of the line Guillaume Tell attempted to break out of Valletta and was intercepted by a British squadron including Lion. During the ensuing battle Dixon was heavily engaged and inflicted severe damage on his French opponent, which was eventually forced to surrender. In August 1802 during the Peace of Amiens, Lion returned to Portsmouth and Dixon was briefly placed in reserve.

When the Napoleonic Wars broke out in 1803, Dixon returned to service as captain of the 74-gun HMS Sceptre and in 1804 transferred to HMS Queen in the Channel Fleet. In 1808 he was promoted to rear-admiral and raised his flag in HMS Temeraire in the Baltic Sea. In 1810 his first wife Christiana Sophia Dixon died suddenly while at dinner with friends in Deal. In 1812 he was transferred to the Brazilian station in HMS Montagu and remained there until the end of the war, receiving a promotion to vice-admiral in 1813 and returning to Britain in 1815 on board HMS Valiant. Entering semi-retirement, Dixon did not return to the Navy and although he was made a Knight Commander of the Order of the Bath in August 1819 and was promoted to full admiral in 1825, he never again commanded at sea. He was Commander-in-Chief, Plymouth from 1830 to 1833. Admiral Dixon died in February 1837 of influenza at his home in Exmouth, Devon.

== Bibliography ==
- Cave, Edward (July 1837). "Obituary". The Gentleman's Magazine. VIII (New Series): 206–207. Retrieved on 1 November 2009

Military offices
Preceded by Lord Northesk	Commander-in-Chief, Plymouth; 1830–1833	Succeeded by Sir William Hargood
