= HMS Santa Dorothea =

Frigate of the Royal Navy

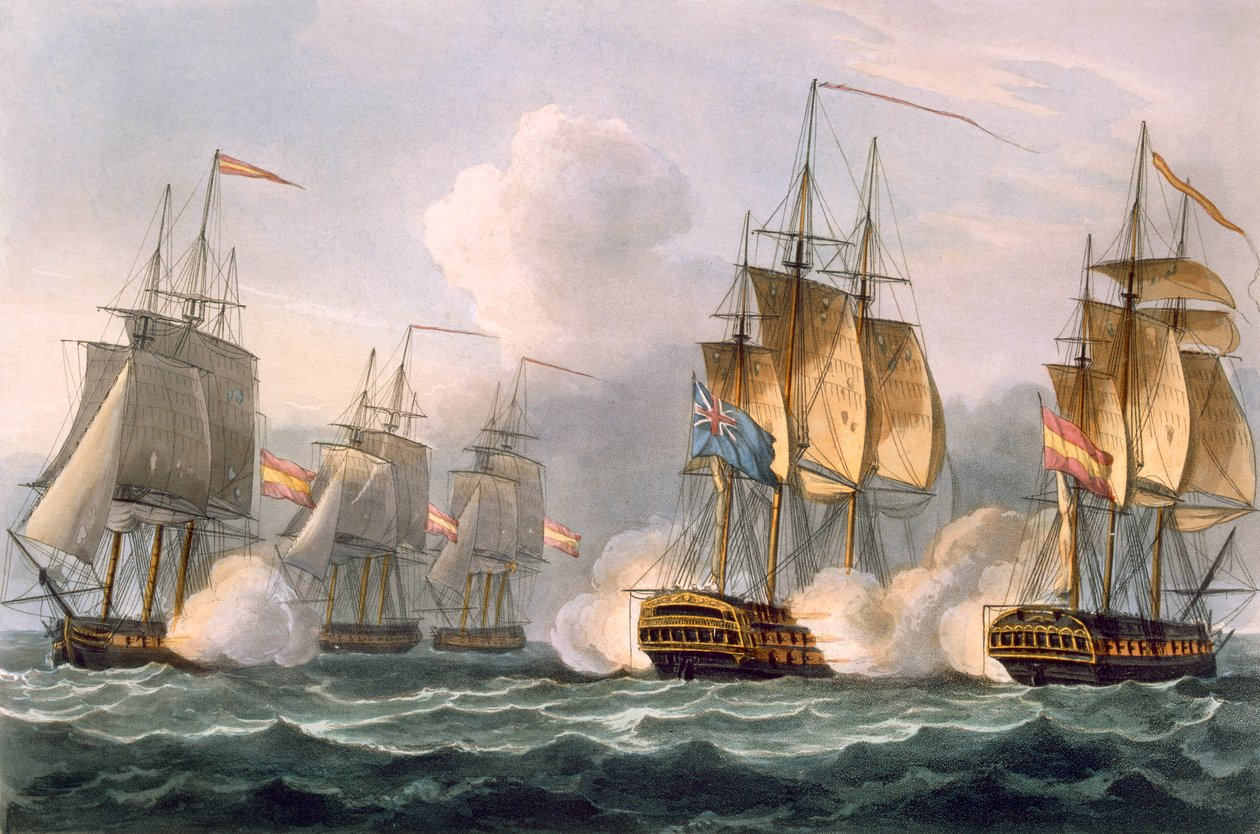
- Capture of Santa Dorothea, 15 July 1798, by Thomas Whitcombe, 1816

History

Spain
- Name: Santa Dorotea
- Builder: Ferrol
- Launched: 1775
- Captured: By the Royal Navy, 15 July 1798

Great Britain
- Name: Santa Dorothea
- Acquired: 15 July 1798 by capture
- Honours and awards: Naval General Service Medal with clasp "Egypt"
- Fate: Broken up in June 1814

General characteristics
- Class & type: 34-gun fifth-rate frigate
- Tons burthen: 95766/94 (bm)
- Length: 146 ft 9 in (44.7 m) (overall); 118 ft 4 1/2 in (36.1 m) (keel)
- Beam: 39 ft (11.9 m)
- Depth of hold: 12 ft (3.66 m)
- Sail plan: Full-rigged ship
- Complement: 240
- Armament: Upper deck: 26 × 12-pounder guns; QD: 6 × 6-pounder guns + 6 × 24-pounder carronades; Fc: 2 × 6-pounder guns + 2 × 24-pounder carronades

HMS Santa Dorothea was a 34-gun fifth-rate frigate of the Royal Navy. She had previously served in the Spanish Navy under the name Santa Dorotea. Built in Spain in 1775, she served during the early years of the French Revolutionary Wars until being captured while sailing as part of a squadron off Cartagena. Taken into British service, she spent the rest of the French Revolutionary and most of the Napoleonic Wars under the White Ensign until being broken up in 1814.

== Spanish career and capture ==
Santa Dorotea was built in Ferrol in 1775. In 1798, she was assigned to a small frigate squadron under Commodore Don Felix O'Neil and departed Cartagena in company with the frigates Pomona, Proserpine, and Santa Cazilda on 8 July. Santa Dorotea's captain for the expedition was Don Manuel Gerraro. Their attempts to raid shipping in the area were unsuccessful, and while returning to port at 09:00 on 15 July, the 64-gun HMS Lion, under Captain Manley Dixon, spotted them. Dixon approached the squadron, closing on Santa Dorotea, which had begun to fall behind her consorts, having lost a topmast sometime earlier. Realizing that Manley was attempting to cut off and engage Santa Dorotea, O'Neil ordered the front three frigates to turn around and sail to her defence. They passed close to the Lion, commencing fire at 11:15. Lion replied, and O'Neil made two further attempts to distract Lion, while Santa Dorotea tried to damage her pursuer with her stern guns. The Spanish broadsides had no real effect, and Dixon was able to come alongside and exchange broadsides with Santa Dorotea.

Lion outgunned Santa Dorotea by nearly two to one and was able to rapidly inflict severe damage on her. Within minutes her mizzenmast had fallen and her mainmast and rudder were severely battered. O'Neil gave up attempting to relieve the beleaguered Santa Dorotea and made for Cartagena at 13:10. Isolated and unable to escape, Gerraro surrendered. Santa Dorotea had been badly damaged with at least 20 men killed and 32 wounded from a crew of 371. Lion had lost just two men wounded in the exchange: a seaman lost a leg and a midshipman was shot in the shoulder. Although Lion's rigging had been badly torn, there was no structural damage at all. Securing his prize, Dixon spent the next day conducting extensive repairs before sending Santa Dorotea to Earl St Vincent off Cadiz.

One of the Spanish prisoners taken was the future Argentine general José de San Martín, who at the time was a staff member on Santa Dorothea.

In 1847, the Admiralty authorized the issuance of the Naval General Service Medal with the clasp "LION 15 JULY 1798" to the remaining British survivors of the action.

== British career ==
Santa Dorothea was registered on 25 December 1798 and commissioned for service that month in the Mediterranean under Captain Hugh Downman. On 28 November that year Santa Dorothea, operating in company with HMS Perseus, HMS Strombolo, and HMS Bulldog captured the 16-gun Spanish naval brig San Leon on the Lisbon station. She was armed with sixteen 6-pounder guns and had a crew of 82 men.

Captain William Brown was to have succeeded Downman in 1799, but he was given another ship instead, and Downman retained Santa Dorothea. He cut out vessels from Bordiguera on 11 January 1800 and Hospitallier on 11 February 1800, before taking command of a three-vessel squadron blockading Savona. (The other two vessels were the sloop Chameleon and the Neapolitan brig Strombolo.) The town surrendered after 41 days, on 15 May. Downman then destroyed all the fortifications in the Gulf of Spezia. He went on to land the Duke of Savoy at Naples and evacuate the gallery of Florence to Sicily, ahead of the invading French. In July 1800 he conveyed troops to Egypt and received the Order of the Crescent. Also during this time, Downman captured three vessels sailing from Egypt carrying General Dessaix and some of Napoleon's staff. Because Santa Dorothea served in the navy's Egyptian campaign (8 March to 2 September 1801), her officers and crew qualified for the "Egypt" clasp on the Naval General Service Medal that the Admiralty authorised in 1850 for all surviving claimants. (Note: A first-class share of the prize money awarded in April 1823 was worth £34 2s 4d; a fifth-class share, that of a seaman, was worth 3s 11½d. The amount was small as the total had to be shared between 79 vessels and the entire army contingent.)

== Fate ==
Captain Jahleel Brenton took command in 1802 and took Santa Dorothea back to England, arriving at Portsmouth on 30 April. She was laid up there in ordinary, moving to Plymouth, still in ordinary, between 1807 and 1813. She was broken up at Portsmouth in June 1814.

== See also ==
- List of ships captured in the 19th century
