= HMS Penelope (1798) =

Frigate of the Royal Navy

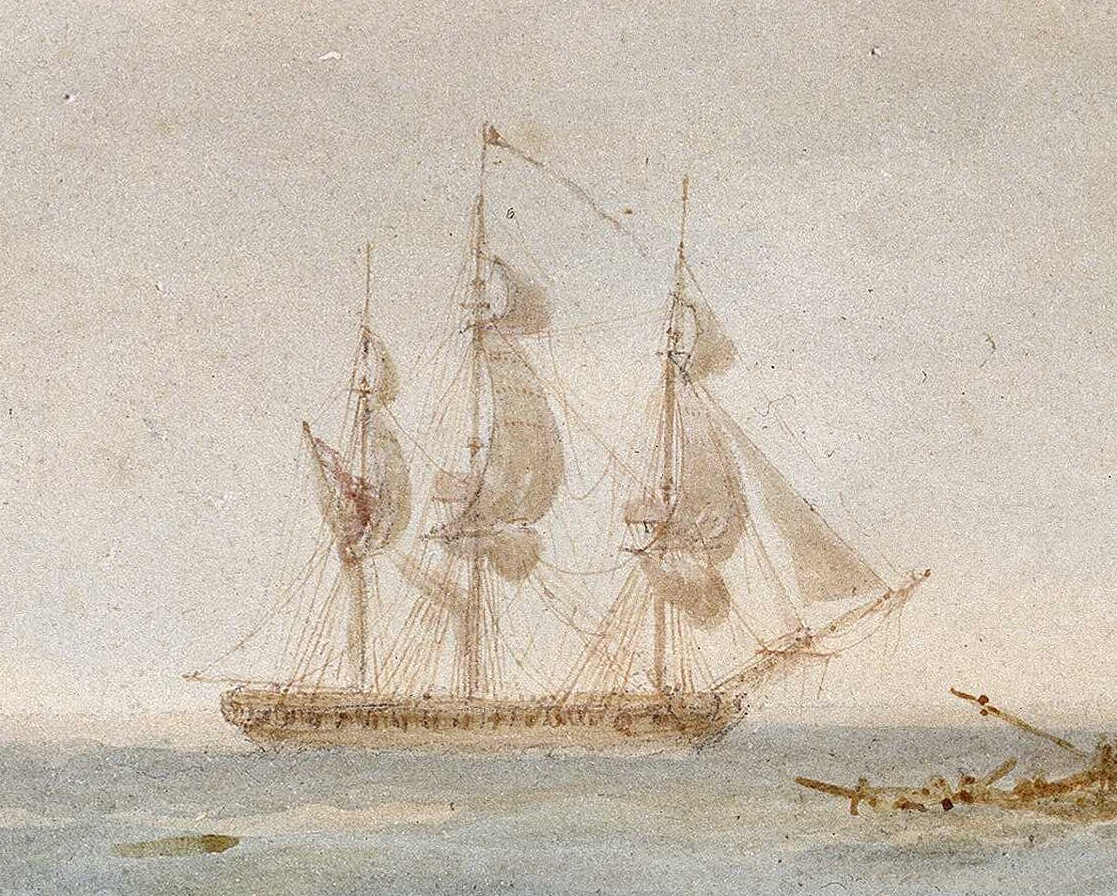
- HMS Penelope

History

United Kingdom
- Name: HMS Penelope
- Builder: Bursledon
- Launched: 1798
- Honours and awards: Naval General Service Medal with clasp "Egypt"
- Fate: Wrecked in 1815

General characteristics
- Class & type: 36-gun fifth rate
- Sail plan: Full-rigged ship

HMS Penelope was a fifth-rate frigate of the Royal Navy, launched in 1798 and wrecked in 1815.

== Career ==
Under Sir Henry Blackwood, she took part in the battle of 30 March 1800 against the Guillaume Tell, off the coast of Valletta, Malta. The British squadron off Malta comprised the 80-gun Foudroyant, the elderly 74-gun Alexander and 64-gun Lion and the 36-gun Penelope. The squadron was supported by the brig Minorca.

The Guillaume Tell had put to sea in the evening of 30 March under the command of French Admiral Denis Decrès. She was sighted by crew aboard Penelope slightly before midnight, heading northeast. Blackwood ordered an immediate pursuit and sent word via Minorca to the rest of the fleet. A first broadside was fired at about 1am, but Guillaume Tell continued on her course without returning fire. By dawn, Penelope had again drawn within range of the larger French vessel, and Blackwood ordered a continued raking fire which brought down Guillaume Tell's main and mizzen topmasts.

Penelope's sister ships Lion and Foudroyant hove into view shortly afterward, and engaged Guillaume Tell at close range, disabling her rigging and causing damage to her hull. Both British ships were badly damaged by the time Guillaume Tell struck her colours, and it was Penelope that took the French ship in tow and led her as a prize to Syracuse. Penelope lost two killed and two wounded in the battle. Blackwood was later commended for his gallantry and perseverance in initially engaging the French ship despite her larger size and firepower.

Northumberland, Alexander, Penelope, Bonne Citoyenne, and the brig Vincejo shared in the proceeds of the French polacca Vengeance, captured entering Valletta, Malta on 6 April.

Because Penelope served in the navy's Egyptian campaign (2 March to 8 September 1801), her officers and crew qualified for the clasp "Egypt" to the Naval General Service Medal that the Admiralty authorised in 1850 for all surviving claimants. (Note: A first-class share of the prize money awarded in April 1823 was worth £34 2s 4d; a fifth-class share, that of a seaman, was worth 3s 11½d. The amount was small as the total had to be shared between 79 vessels and the entire army contingent.)

From 1803, Penelope served in the English Channel under William Robert Broughton.

Penelope shared with Moselle and Boadicea in the proceeds of the Jonge Obyna, Smidt, master, on 13 June 1805. (Note: A seaman's share of a £1700 advance on the prize money was 16s 2½d.)

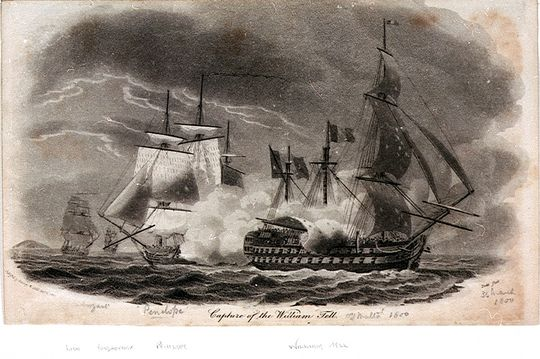
HMS Penelope is seen raking the Guillaume Tell as the two ships of the line close in

== Fate ==
On 30 April 1815, Penelope, under James Galloway, ran aground near the Cap des Rosiers, British North America. She broke apart during the night, killing at least 40 of her crew. Many survivors subsequently froze to death. In all, 216 men drowned or froze to death. Sixty-six men and two women reached Douglastown two days later. The subsequent court-martial placed the master at the bottom of the list of seniority for failing to pay attention to the situation of the ship. Galloway and his First Lieutenant were reprimanded for the breakdown of discipline on board and on shore during the disaster; neither was employed again. One seaman received 500 lashes for insubordination, desertion, and being drunk. Some 48 men took the opportunity to desert.
