= William Brown (Royal Navy officer) =

Royal Navy officer (1764–1814)

Rear-Admiral William Brown
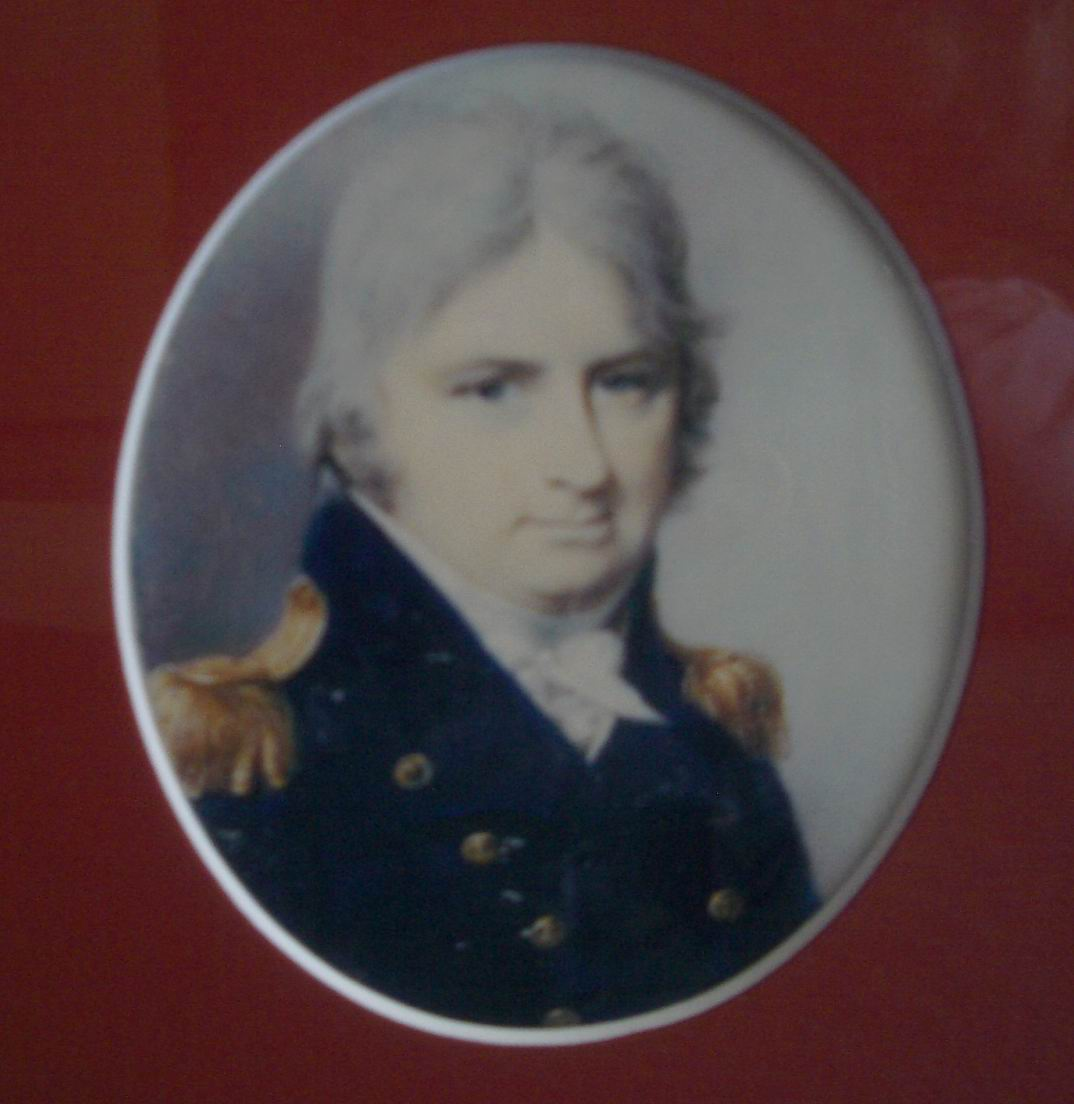
- William Brown
- Born: 8 May 1764; Leesthorpe Hall, Melton Mowbray, Leicestershire
- Died: 20 September 1814 (aged 50); Kingston, Jamaica
- Military career
- Allegiance: United Kingdom
- Branch: Royal Navy
- Service years: 1770s to 1814
- Rank: Rear-Admiral
- Commands: Jamaica Station
- Conflicts: French Revolutionary Wars; Glorious First of June; Napoleonic Wars; Battle of Cape Finisterre

William Brown (8 May 1764 – 20 September 1814) was an officer of the British Royal Navy who served in increasingly senior positions during a long period from the American Revolutionary War, including the French Revolutionary War, and until the Napoleonic Wars. He began his naval career as a servant to Captain Philemon Pownoll in the frigate HMS Apollo and became a midshipman after two years. He then served on HMS Resolution with Lord Robert Manners and came home with him in HMS Andromache. He spent the next five years ashore in peacetime. After a brief time on HMS Bounty he was taken off by the First Lord and moved to HMS Ariel before Bounty sailed. He was then moved to HMS Leander, where he was commissioned by Admiral Peyton in 1788. He later captained a series of ships serving in the Mediterranean Sea, the North Sea, the Channel Fleet and then the Mediterranean, again with Lord St Vincent. He captained HMS Ajax in the Blockade of Brest and the Battle of Cape Finisterre and then at Cadiz at Nelson's personal request. After Trafalgar he had a series of shore postings as Dockyard Commissioner at Malta and Shearness before being made Commander in Chief of the Channel Islands and then Jamaica where he died.

== Early career ==
William Brown was born in 1764, the second son of John Suffield Brown, a local landowner and Deputy Lord Lieutenant of Leicestershire. Aged 13 he joined the navy by 1777 and was a captain's servant. After two years of service in the American Revolutionary War in Apollo she returned to the Channel Fleet, where William was lucky to escape with a wounded hand after being shot by a sharpshooter in the rigging of a French frigate they had engaged, the shot having passed through the brim of his hat. Apollo subsequently joined Admiral Rodney's fleet for the relief of Gibraltar and Menorca when she participated in the Moonlight battle. William was then with Lord Robert Manners in HMS Resolution for two years and was present at the Battle of the Saints. He accompanied his wounded captain in HMS Andromache to return to England and was with Manners when he died. He was an efficient officer who passed for lieutenant in 1788 and was made commander of the 18-gun sloop HMS Zebra during the Spanish armament in 1790. In the first year of the French Revolutionary Wars he was in command of HMS Fly.

By his promotion to captain, Brown had already seen extensive service in the Mediterranean and in the Channel Fleet, Brown was made a post captain and given the frigate HMS Venus. and was attached to Lord Howe's force during the Atlantic campaign of May 1794. At the culminating battle on the Glorious First of June, Brown acted as a repeater for Howe's signals to emphasise them to captains further away from the flagship. Late in the action he also helped tow wrecked ships out of the battleline.

Late in 1794, Brown married Catherine Travers, who died in 1795 shortly after the birth of their son John William Brown. Following his wife's death, Brown took service at sea in command of HMS Alcmene under Admiral John Jervis and had to have a mutineer executed by the crew off Cadiz. After two years of service with Lord St Vincent (as Jervis had become), he retired to a Lisbon hospital in 1797. He recovered by the spring of 1798 and was given command of the ship of the line HMS Defence by Lord St Vincent from March 1798, but was superseded by Captain John Peyton, who had been appointed by the First Lord at the same time. In 1799, Brown took passage to Gibraltar to command the frigate HMS Santa Dorothea, but on arrival was instead made captain of the 80-gun HMS Foudroyant. Brown took this ship to serve with Nelson off Malta and Nelson switched Brown with Thomas Masterman Hardy on HMS Vanguard.

== Napoleonic Wars ==
In 1801, Brown left Vanguard and moved into HMS Robust, in which he served for one year in the Channel Fleet under Lord St Vincent. He then commanded the frigate HMS Hussar in the Cork Squadron. During the Peace of Amiens, Brown married Martha Vere Fothergill and the couple had four children. He then commanded HMS Romney in the Atlantic. Early in 1805, Brown was transferred to HMS Ajax with the fleet under Sir Robert Calder. Calder led his force against the Franco-Spanish fleet of Pierre-Charles Villeneuve on 22 July 1805 at the Battle of Cape Finisterre. During the battle, which was fought in thick fog, Brown turned his ship away to inform his admiral the enemy was changing direction in the fog. Although opinion was and still is divided on where the fault lay for the failure to destroy Villeneuve at the battle, Calder's fleet did seriously damage their opponents and capture two ships. In Britain however there was anger that the victory was not more comprehensive and Calder demanded a court martial to clear his name. One of the captain he brought back to England from Cadiz with him was Brown, who left Ajax in the hands of Lieutenant John Pilfold.

Whilst Calder and Brown were in Britain, Nelson led the British fleet, including Ajax to complete victory at the Battle of Trafalgar. Calder was highly criticised at his trial and lost much prestige, Brown continued to serve with several senior staff positions. Amongst these was command of the Malta Dockyard and the Sheerness Dockyard, duties he performed efficiently.

In 1812, Brown was promoted to rear-admiral and given the command of the Channel Islands station. In 1813, Brown was transferred to the Jamaica Station as commanding naval officer of the island and it was during service there that he contracted yellow fever and died on 20 September 1814. He was buried at Kingston.

== Notes ==
Military offices
Preceded by Charles Stirling	Commander-in-Chief, Jamaica Station; 1813–1814	Succeeded by Sir Alexander Cochrane
