= Hugh Downman (physician) =

English physician, poet and dramatist

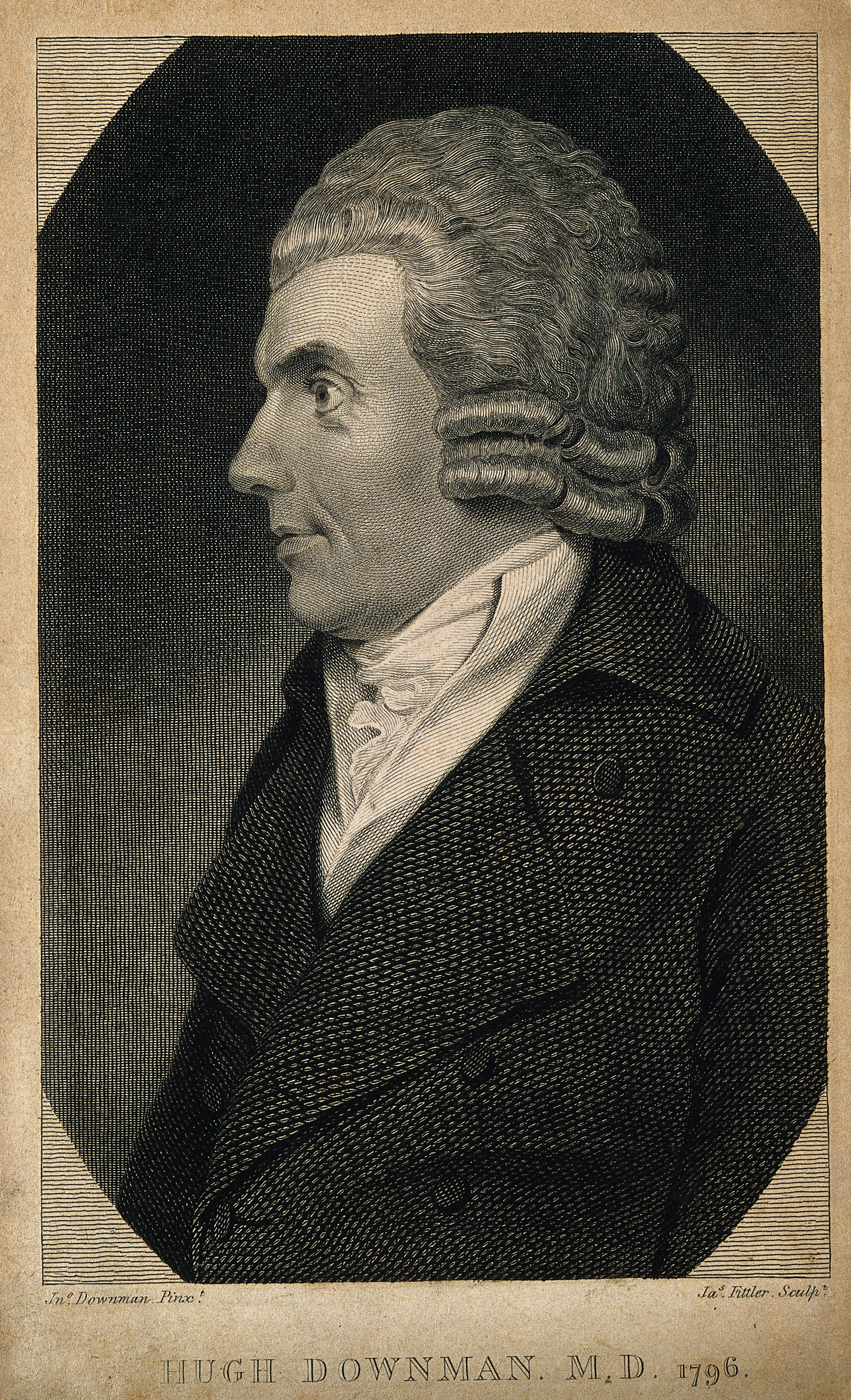
- Born: 1740
- Died: 23 September 1809 (aged 68–69)
- Occupations: Physician, poet and dramatist

Hugh Downman (1740 – 23 September 1809) was an English physician, poet and dramatist.

== Biography ==
Downman was the son of Hugh Downman of Newton House, Newton St. Cyres, Exeter. He was educated at the Exeter grammar school. He entered Balliol College, Oxford, 1758, proceeded B.A. 1763, and was ordained in Exeter Cathedral the same year. His clerical prospects being very small, he went to Edinburgh to study medicine, and boarded with Thomas Blacklock. In 1768 he published ‘The Land of the Muses; a poem in the manner of Spenser, by H. D.’ In 1769 he visited London for hospital practice, and in 1770, after proceeding M.A. at Jesus College, Cambridge, he practised medicine at Exeter, where he married the daughter of Dr. Andrew. A chronic complaint in 1778 compelled him to retire for a time. His best-known poem, ‘ Infancy, or the Management of Children,’ was published in three separate parts: i. 1774, ii. 1775, iii. 1776, London, 4to. A seventh edition was issued in 1809. In 1775 appeared ‘The Drama,’ London, 4to; ‘An Elegy written under a Gallows,’ London, 4to; and ‘The Soliloquy,’ Edinburgh, 4to. During his retirement he also published ‘Lucius Junius Brutus,’ five acts, London, 1779 (not performed); ‘Belisarius,’ played in Exeter theatre for a few nights; and ‘Editha, a Tragedy,’ Exeter, 1784—founded on a local incident, and performed for sixteen nights. These plays appeared in one volume as ‘Tragedies, by H. D., M.D.,’ Exeter, 1792, 8vo. He also published ‘Poems to Thespia,’ Exeter, 1781, 8vo, and ‘The Death Song of Ragnar Lodbrach,’ translated from the Latin of Olaus Wormius, London, 1781, 4to. He was one of the translators of an edition of Voltaire's works in English, London, 8vo, 1781. In 1791 he published ‘Poems,’ second edition, London, 8vo, comprising the ‘Land of the Muses’ (with a second version) and ‘Ragnar Lodbrach.’ He was also contributor to Richard Polwhele's ‘Collections of the Poetry of Devon and Cornwall.’

Downman seems to have resumed medical practice at Exeter about 1790, and in 1796 he founded there a literary society of twelve members. A volume of the essays was printed, and a second volume is said to exist in manuscript. Downman wrote the opening address, and essays on ‘Serpent Worship,’ on the ‘Shields of Hercules and Achilles,’ and on ‘Pindar,’ with a translation of the 11th Pythian and 2nd Isthmian odes. In 1805 Downman finally relinquished his practice on account of ill-health. In 1808 the literary society was discontinued. On 23 September 1809 he died at Alphington, near Exeter, with the reputation of an able and humane physician and a most amiable man. Two years before he died an anonymous editor collected and published the various critical opinions and complimentary verses on his poems, Isaac D'Israeli's (1792) being among them.
