= Action of 15 July 1798 =

1798 naval battle of the French Revolutionary Wars

- Part of the Mediterranean campaign of 1798
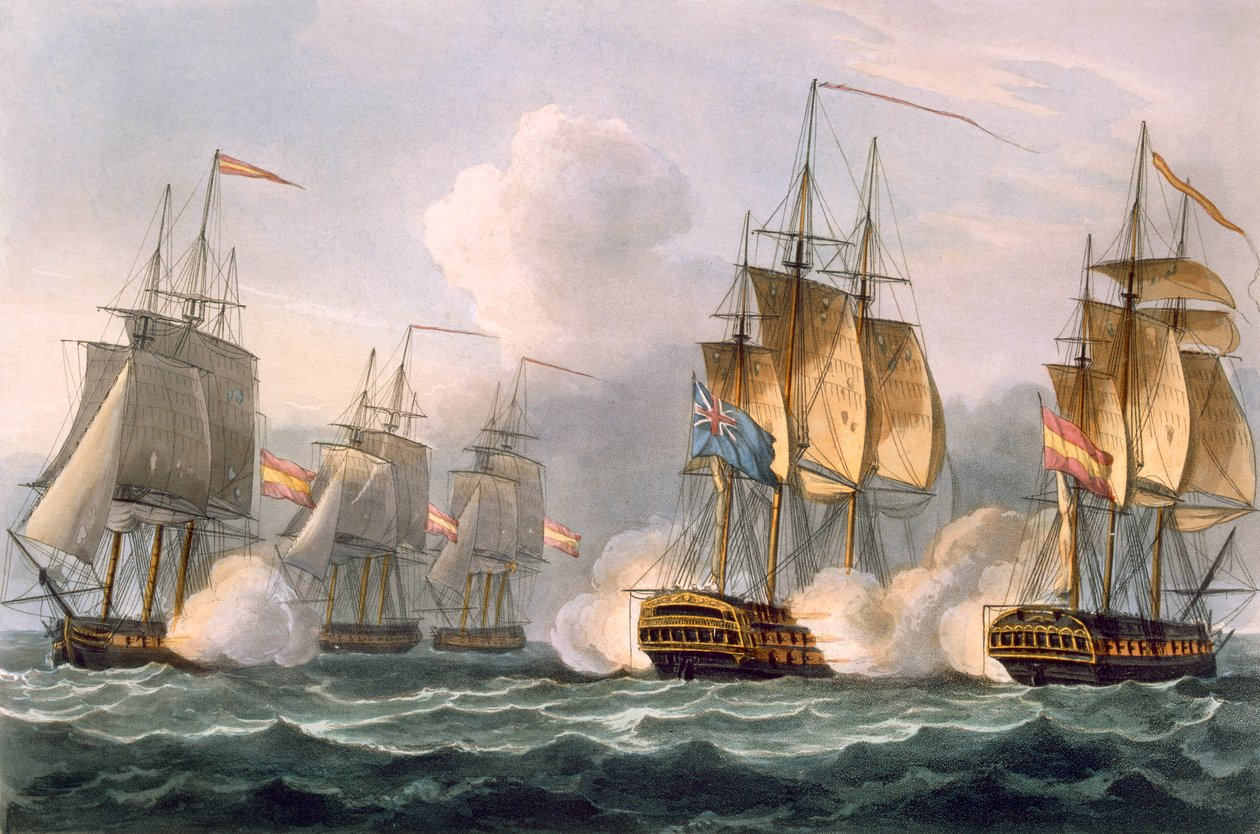
- 1816 illustration of the battle
Date	15 July 1798
Location	Off Cartagena, Mediterranean Sea
Result	British victory

Belligerents
Great Britain	Spain

Commanders and leaders
Manley Dixon	Felix O'Neil

Strength
1 ship of the line	4 frigates

Casualties and losses
2 wounded	20 killed; 32 wounded; 1 frigate captured

The action of 15 July 1798 was a minor naval battle of the French Revolutionary Wars, fought off the Spanish Mediterranean coast by the Royal Navy ship of the line HMS Lion under Captain Manley Dixon and a squadron of four Spanish Navy frigates under Commodore Don Felix O'Neil. Lion was one of several ships sent into the Western Mediterranean by Vice-Admiral Earl St Vincent, commander of the British Mediterranean Fleet based at the Tagus in Portugal during the late spring of 1798. The Spanish squadron was a raiding force that had sailed from Cartagena in Murcia seven days earlier, and was intercepted while returning to its base after an unsuccessful cruise. Although together the Spanish vessels outweighed the British ship, individually they were weaker and Commodore O'Neil failed to ensure that his manoeuvres were co-ordinated. As a result, one of the frigates, Santa Dorotea, fell out of the line of battle and was attacked by Lion.

Despite ineffectual long-range gunfire towards the British ship by the remainder of the Spanish squadron, the isolated Santa Dorotea was rapidly forced to surrender, O'Neil eventually turning the other three frigates back towards Cartagena. Unopposed, Dixon was able to consolidate his prize and send it to St Vincent's fleet off Cádiz, where it was subsequently purchased into the Royal Navy. Lion remained in the Mediterranean during the year, later participating in the blockades of Malta and Alexandria. The Spanish, their seaports tightly blockaded by the British navy, launched no further expeditions into the Mediterranean during the year.

== Background ==
At the start of 1798, the Mediterranean Sea was entirely under the control of the French Navy and their allies, including Spain, which had switched sides in the French Revolutionary Wars in late 1796 at the Treaty of San Ildefonso. Denied access to deep water ports and adequate supplies, the Royal Navy fleet deployed in the Mediterranean under Vice-Admiral Sir John Jervis was forced to withdraw to the nearest friendly fleet anchorage, at the mouth of the Tagus River in Portugal. Although forced to retreat, Jervis' force was not defeated and on 14 February 1797 he achieved a victory over the Spanish Navy at the Battle of Cape St Vincent, capturing four Spanish ships of the line. A blockade of the Spanish Atlantic ports was instituted, especially Cádiz, the large southern fleet anchorage, and the Spanish did not again attempt to break out during the remainder of the year.

Early in 1798, rumours reached Jervis, recently ennobled as Earl St Vincent, of a buildup of French forces around the Mediterranean seaport of Toulon under General Napoleon Bonaparte. Similar rumours had reached the Admiralty in London, and St Vincent therefore sent Rear-Admiral Sir Horatio Nelson and three ships of the line to observe French activity. Nelson arrived too late however, and the French fleet had already sailed, carrying over 30,000 men into the Eastern Mediterranean. Nelson, joined by a fleet of ten ships sent by St Vincent under Captain Thomas Troubridge, pursued the French, but failed to learn of their destination before the French fleet captured Malta. Ten days later, Bonaparte sailed for Alexandria for the second stage of his operation and Nelson's fleet unwittingly passed his during the night, the British beating the French to Egypt but sailing off again before Bonaparte arrived.

While Nelson was crossing the Mediterranean, St Vincent was taking advantage of the absence of enemy forces in the Western Mediterranean to deploy newly arrived warships to the region. One of these vessels was the 64-gun ship of the line HMS Lion, under the command of Captain Manley Dixon, who had been sent to St Vincent's fleet early in the year as a replacement for one of Troubridge's ships. Initially ordered to patrol the Spanish Mediterranean coast, Lion was cruising 97 miles (156 km) southeast of Cartagena, a port in the Spanish Region of Murcia at 09:00 on 15 July when four sails were spotted to the southeast.

== Battle ==
The four sails spotted by Lion's lookout were a squadron of Spanish frigates that had departed Cartagena on 8 July for a brief and unsuccessful commerce raiding operation in the Western Mediterranean. Each ship carried 34 guns and a weight of shot of approximately 180 pounds (82 kg) to Lion's 678 pounds (308 kg). On sighting Lion, the Spanish ships formed a battle line, with Commodore Felix O'Neil's flagship Pomona under Captain Don Francis Villamil in the lead followed by Proserpine under Captain Don Quaj. Bial, Santa Dorotea under Captain Don Manuel Gerraro and Santa Cazilda under Captain Don Deam. Errara. Seeking to engage the strangers, Dixon bore up, halting his movement to ensure he held the weather gage. This would enable him to manoeuvre with the wind and attack the Spanish at the time of his choosing. Seizing the advantage, Dixon then bore down on the frigate squadron, which prepared to meet the attack.

One of the frigates, Santa Dorotea, had lost a topmast sometime earlier and as result was slower than the rest of the squadron. Falling behind the others, Gerraro soon found that his ship was in danger of being isolated by Lion, as Dixon steered for the rapidly opening gap between the Spanish ships. Recognising the danger, O'Neil ordered the front three frigates to turn around and sail to the defence of Santa Dorotea, passing close by Lion and opening a heavy fire at 11:15. Lion replied, and the Spanish frigates did not immediately turn back for a second pass, continuing ahead as Dixon closed with the straggling Santa Dorotea. In an effort to deter the ship of the line, Gerraro opened fire on Lion with his stern chasers, cannon situated in the frigate's stern, which caused considerable damage to Dixon's rigging. As Lion began to close the distance, O'Neil's ships returned, but the frigates passed Lion at extreme distance, their broadsides having no effect and again coming under fire themselves.

Eventually, Dixon succeeded in bringing his ship alongside the Spanish frigate and opened a heavy fire, to which Gerraro replied with his own broadside. The larger and more powerful British ship was able to rapidly inflict severe damage to the Santa Dorotea, and within minutes the mizzenmast had fallen and the mainmast and rudder were severely battered. As Santa Dorotea veered off course, O'Neil passed Lion for a third time, at an even greater distance than before, and once again his broadsides failed to have an effect and again he came under fire from the British vessel. His last attempt to save Santa Dorotea defeated, O'Neil turned away and his ships raised all sail in the direction of Cartagena at 13:10. Gerraro, his isolated ship trapped by Lion, which was slowly turning back towards the drifting frigate, raised the Union Flag upside down as a sign of surrender.

== Aftermath ==
Santa Dorotea had suffered severe damage during the brief engagement, and had at least 20 men killed and 32 wounded from a crew of 371. By contrast, Lion had lost just two men wounded in the exchange: a seaman lost a leg and a midshipman was shot in the shoulder. Although Lion's rigging had been badly torn, there was no structural damage at all. Securing his prize, Dixon spent the next day conducting extensive repairs before sending Santa Dorotea to Earl St Vincent off Cádiz. The captured ship was purchased into the Royal Navy and served for several years as HMS Santa Dorotea, rated at 36 guns. The prize money generated by the sale of the captured ship and the stores aboard was paid out to the Dixon's crew in October 1800. Nearly five decades later the Admiralty recognised the action with the clasp "LION 15 JULY 1798" attached to the Naval General Service Medal, awarded upon application to all British participants still living in 1847.

Lion remained in the Western Mediterranean for the next two months, eventually joining with a squadron of four Portuguese ships of the line under the command of Tomás Xavier Teles de Castro da Gama, Marquess de Niza. In September, Niza's squadron was ordered to join Nelson in his search for the French and sailed eastwards, but while passing to the north of Malta they encountered a large convoy of battered vessels under Captain Sir James Saumarez. These ships were seven British ships of the line and six captured French ships, all survivors of the Battle of the Nile, Nelson's successful conclusion of the campaign fought at Aboukir Bay off Egypt on 1 August. The Anglo-Portuguese squadron continued to Alexandria in October, briefly joining the blockade squadron there under Captain Sir Samuel Hood before returning to Malta in December as part of a new squadron formed off the island. Lion followed the Portuguese back to Malta in December. The Spanish did not launch another expedition from their Mediterranean ports during 1798.

== Bibliography ==
- Adkins, Roy & Lesley (2006). The War for All the Oceans. Abacus. ISBN 0-349-11916-3.
- Clowes, William Laird (1997) [1900]. The Royal Navy, A History from the Earliest Times to 1900, Volume IV. Chatham Publishing. ISBN 1-86176-013-2.
- Gardiner, Robert, ed. (2001) [1996]. Nelson Against Napoleon. Caxton Editions. ISBN 1-86176-026-4.
- James, William (2002) [1827]. The Naval History of Great Britain, Volume 2, 1797–1799. Conway Maritime Press. ISBN 0-85177-906-9.
- Maffeo, Steven E. (2000). Most Secret and Confidential: Intelligence in the Age of Nelson. London: Chatham Publishing. ISBN 1-86176-152-X.
- Rose, J. Holland (1924). "Napoleon and Sea Power". Cambridge Historical Journal. 1 (2): 138–157. doi:10.1017/S1474691300000925.
