= Denis Decrès =

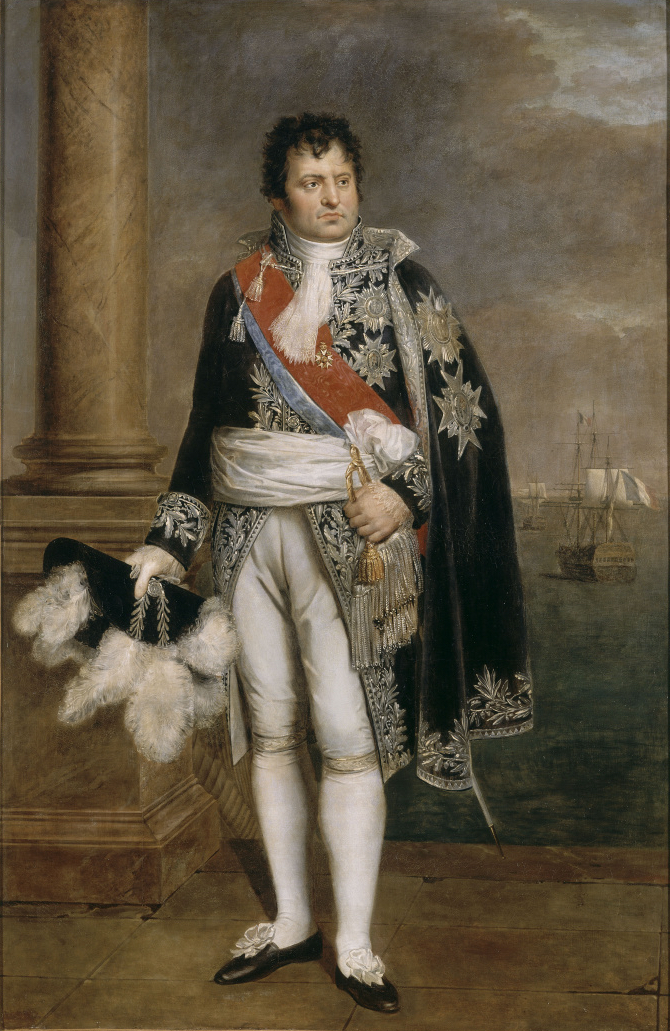
- Portrait by René Théodore Berthon, 1806

Minister of the Navy and the Colonies
- In office 3 October 1801 – 1 April 1814
- Monarch: Napoleon
- Preceded by: Pierre-Alexandre-Laurent Forfait
- Succeeded by: Pierre Victor, baron Malouet
- In office 20 March 1815 – 7 July 1815
- Monarch: Napoleon
- Preceded by: Jacques Claude Beugnot
- Succeeded by: Arnail François, marquis de Jaucourt

Personal details
- Born: 18 June 1761 Châteauvillain, Lorraine
- Died: 7 December 1820 (aged 59) Paris, France
- Resting place: Père Lachaise Cemetery

Military service
- Allegiance: Kingdom of France; French First Republic; First French Empire
- Branch/service: French Navy; French Imperial Navy
- Years of service: 1779–1793; 1793–1804; 1804–1814; 1815
- Rank: Vice admiral
- Battles/wars: American Revolutionary War; Battle of the Saintes; French Revolutionary Wars; French expedition to Ireland (1796); French invasion of Malta; Battle of the Nile; Action of 31 March 1800 (surrendered)

Vice-Admiral Denis Decrès (18 June 1761 – 7 December 1820) was a French Navy officer and politician who served as Minister of the Navy and the Colonies from 1801 to 1814 and again in 1815.

== Early career ==
Decrès was born in Châteauvillain, Haute-Marne on 18 June 1761 and joined the Navy at the age of 18, in the squadron of Admiral De Grasse. He took part in all the combats in which this fleet participated. While he was a member of the crew of the Richmond, during the Battle of the Saintes on 12 April 1782, he went in a boat under fire from British ships to attach a tow cable to the Glorieux, which had been dismasted, to bring it out of the danger in which it was placed. He was rewarded with a promotion to enseigne de vaisseau. This event is commemorated on one side of his tomb. He then was transferred to the new frigate Nymphe, participating in the capture of HMS Argo. Decres then served on numerous other vessels, becoming a Lieutenant in 1786 and a Captain in 1793. He was in India when the French Revolution broke out.

== Revolutionary era ==
In October 1793, Decrès was sent as a messenger to request assistance for the Isle de France (now Mauritius). He was arrested on his arrival in Lorient, on 10 April 1794, for being a member of the nobility. He was restored to his rank of capitaine de vaisseau in June 1795, and promoted to command of the 80-gun ship Formidable in October 1795. While in command of her, he took part, as a division commander, in the failed attempt to invade Ireland in 1796. Promoted to contre-amiral in April 1798, he was in command of a light squadron during the campaign in Egypt, covering the landing on Malta. Napoleon appointed him to command the frigate squadron accompanying Brueys's fleet in the expedition to Egypt, and took part in the disastrous French defeat at the Battle of the Nile on the 40-gun frigate Diane and managed to escape to Malta, where he hoisted his flag aboard the 80-gun ship Guillaume Tell. During the period of 1799 - 1800, Decrès had under his command a rear admiral, Jacques Bedout, whom he saw fit to relieve of his command. Bedout's subsequent resignation was refused and in 1802, Napoleon gave Bedout a five-ship squadron. The flagship was the Argonaute.

== Consulate and First Empire ==
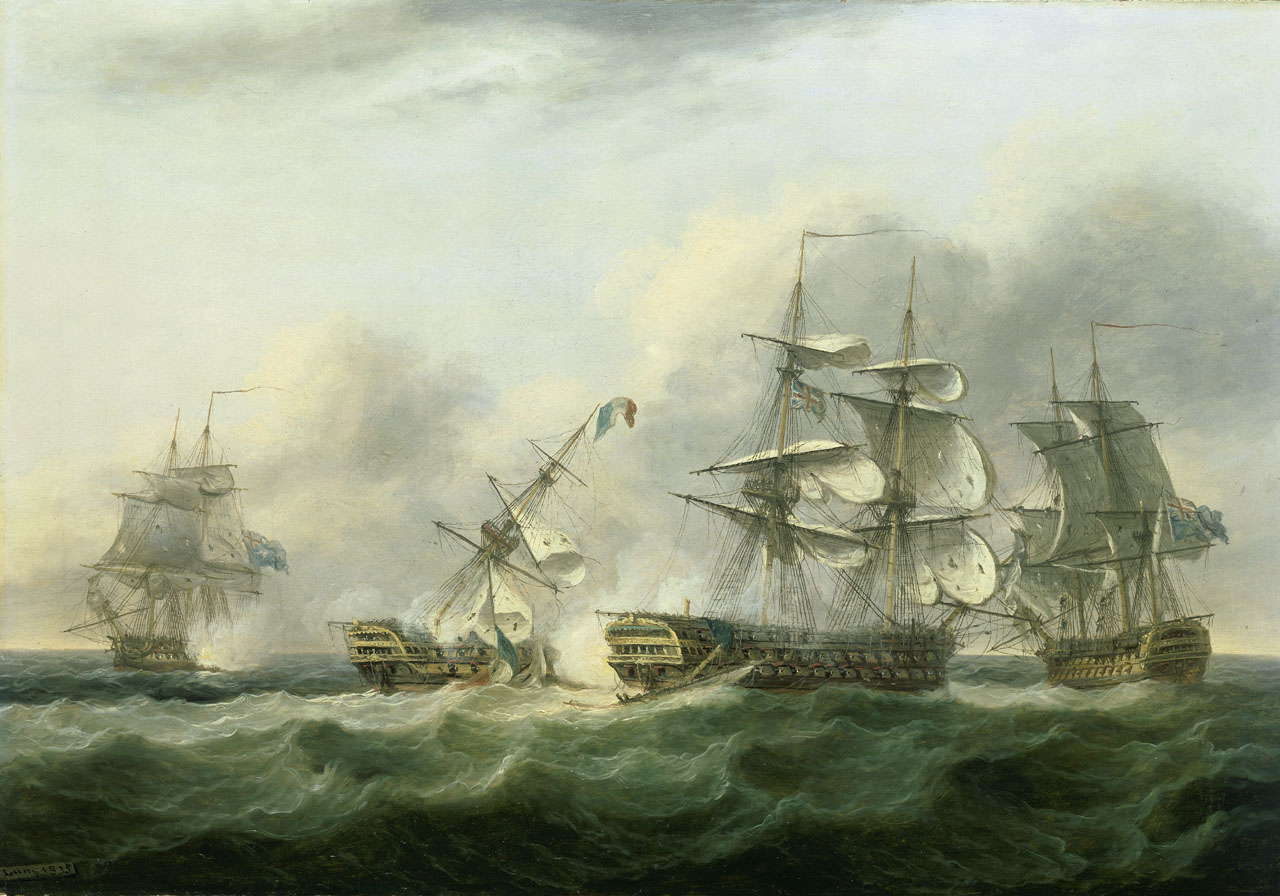
A painting of the Action of 31 March 1800

Attacked by three British ships as he was trying to break the blockade of Malta on 30 March 1800, with 200 sick and 1000 soldiers aboard, he surrendered early next day with half of his crew killed or wounded. He was exchanged in August 1800, and returned to France, where the First Consul personally gave him an honour sabre - a grant of the "Arms of Honour" which Napoleon had introduced as a decoration before instituting the Légion d'honneur - and appointed him as maritime prefect at Lorient. From 3 October 1801 to the end of the Empire on 1 April 1814, he served as Napoleon's Minister of the Navy. During this period, he organised French efforts to re-establish slavery in France's colonies, and Decrès was strong expounder of proslavery thought. He was again promoted - this time to vice-amiral - on 30 May 1804.

In 1808, he was made a count of the empire. In April 1813 he was made a duke, and on 3 November that year he married Marie-Rose Rosine Clary of the influential Clary family; she was the cousin by birth of Julie Clary. Marie-Rose had previously been married to General Saligny until the latter's death in 1809. Through marriage Dècres became brother-in-law to Marshal Suchet, and nephew of both Marshal Bernadotte and Joseph Bonaparte. Upon Napoleon's return from Elba to France, Decrès briefly resumed his post as Minister of the Navy during the Hundred Days from 20 March to 22 June 1815, and from then until his successor was appointed on 7 July. He died in a fire at his house in Paris on 7 December 1820, set by one of his servants who was trying to kill and rob him. He is buried in Père Lachaise Cemetery. His tomb has a low-relief sculpture depicting his brave actions in rescuing the Glorieux during the Battle of the Saintes.

Political offices
Preceded by Pierre-Alexandre-Laurent Forfait	Ministers of Marine and the Colonies; 3 October 1801 – 1 April 1814	Succeeded by Pierre Victor, baron Malouet
Preceded by Jacques, comte Beugnot	Ministers of Marine and the Colonies; 20 March 1815 – 7 July 1815	Succeeded by François Arnail, comte de Jaucourt
