= French brig Alerte (1787) =

Alerte
History

France
- Name: Alerte
- Ordered: 1786
- Builder: Hubert Pennevert, Rochefort dockyard
- Laid down: 1786
- Launched: 20 April 1787
- Commissioned: January 1788
- Captured: 28 August 1793

Great Britain
- Name: Alerte
- Acquired: 28 August 1793
- Fate: Burnt, 18 December 1793

France
- Name: Alerte
- Acquired: by salvage, 28 December 1793
- Captured: 17 June 1799

Great Britain
- Name: Minorca
- Namesake: Minorca
- Acquired: 17 June 1799
- Commissioned: August 1800
- Out of service: April 1802
- Honours and awards: Naval General Service Medal with clasp "Egypt"
- Fate: Sold, 1802

General characteristics
- Type: Brig
- Displacement: 330 tons (French)
- Tons burthen: 248 (bm)
- Length: 85 ft 0 in (25.9 m) (overall); 70 ft 1 in (21.4 m) (keel)
- Beam: 26 ft 7 in (8.1 m)
- Depth of hold: 10 ft 0 in (3.0 m)
- Complement: 1786:90; 1794:98; 120 men at time of capture
- Armament: 1787–93: 10 × 4-pounder guns; 1794: 14 × 4-pounder guns; 14 × 6-pounder guns at time of capture

The French brig Alerte was launched in April 1787. The Royal Navy captured her at Toulon in August 1793, and renamed her HMS Vigilante. The British set her on fire when they evacuated Toulon in December of that year. After the French rebuilt her as Alerte, she served at the Battle of Aboukir Bay. The British recaptured her in June 1799 and took her into service as HMS Minorca. Minorca was sold in 1802.

== French brig Alerte (I) ==
Alerte was built at Rochefort Dockyard and designed as an aviso, under the designation Aviso No. 1. Hubert Pennevert completed her as a bric of 10 guns.

In 1790 she was under the command of Sous-lieutenant de vaisseau D'Aujard in the Levant. In November 1791, still under the command of D'Aujard, she was cruising off the coast of Syria. In 1793 she cruised along the Ligurian coast, escorted a convoy from Villefranche to Toulon, and sailed from Tunis to Marseilles. Between 4 April and 17 May she was under the command of Lieutenant de vaisseau Courdouan; between 17 July and 5 August she was under the command of Lieutenant de vaisseau Marchand.

== British brig ==
On 28 August 1793, the British occupied Toulon, where Alerte was among the many vessels they seized. The British renamed her HMS Vigilante, before renaming her back to Alert or Alerte. (Note: French sources report that Alerte became Vigilante. British accounts refer to her as HMS Alerte, though the National Maritime Museum has a record of her being commissioned as Vigilante in September 1793.) In September she was under the command of Commander William Edge.

The Siege of Toulon went badly for the Royalist, Spanish, and British forces, and they were forced to quit the city on 18 December. As they did so, they set fire to the "Frigate Alerte", of "16 guns" and "in want of repairs".

== French brig Alerte (II) ==
Alerte burned to her waterline, but the French were able to rebuild her at Toulon during January and February 1794. She was in dry-dock at Venice between June and July 1797.

On 1 August 1798 Alerte was at the battle of Aboukir Bay (Battle of the Nile). Vice-Admiral François-Paul Brueys D'Aigalliers hoped to lure the British fleet onto the shoals at Aboukir Island, sending the brigs Alerte and Railleur to act as decoys in the shallow waters, but the plan failed. Then, as the British fleet approached, Brueys sent Alerte ahead, passing close to the leading British ships and then steering sharply to the west over the shoal in the hope that the ships of the line might follow and become grounded. None of Nelson's captains fell for the ruse and the British fleet continued undeterred.

After the French defeat, Alerte left Alexandria in the squadron under Contre-Admiral Jean-Baptiste Perrée, consisting of the 40-gun Junon, 36-gun Alceste, 32-gun Courageuse, 18-gun Salamine, and Alerte. The squadron then carried artillery and munitions from Alexandria to Jaffa, and cruised the coast of Syria. Being almost completely bereft of ammunition, having left most of it at Jaffa, the squadron headed for Europe and then took shelter in Genoa.

On 17 June 1799 the squadron, still under Perrée, while en route from Genoa for Toulon, was south of Toulon when it ran into a British squadron under the command of Captain John Markham of Centaur. In the ensuing Action of 18 June 1799, the British captured the entire French squadron, with Captain capturing the brig Alerte which was under the command of "Dumay, Lieutenant". French records show that she was under the command of lieutenant de vaisseau Demay.

== HMS Minorca ==
The British took Alerte into service as Minorca. They commissioned her in August 1800 under Commander George Miller. On 26 January Foudroyant was in company with Minorca and Queen Charlotte when she recaptured the Ragusean brig Annonciata, Michele Pepi, master.

Minorca served with the British blockade of Malta. Between 29 and 31 March Minorca played an important role in the capture of the French ship of the line Guillaume-Tell by sailing to bring up ships of the blockading squadron while the frigate HMS Penelope harried her.

Minorca was among the many ships that shared in the proceeds of the capture of the French frigate Dianne on 25 August. On 16 February 1801 she captured the Turenne, J. Imbert, master, or the Furienne. (Note: The National Maritime Museum database gives the name of the captured vessel as Furieuse.) Turenne or Furienne was a French xebec of six guns and a crew of 38 men. She had 1200 stand of arms on board and had been sailing from Leghorn to Alexandria.

In March Minorca returned to Aboukir Bay. She was part of Admiral Keith's naval force at the British expedition to Egypt. Here she was among the vessels moored as near as possible to the beach, with their broadsides towards it to support the landing of the troops. (Note: A first-class share of the prize money awarded in April 1823 was worth £34 2s 4d; a fifth-class share, that of a seaman, was worth 3s 11½d. The amount was small as the total had to be shared between 79 vessels and the entire army contingent.) In 1850 the Admiralty authorized the award of the Naval General Service medal with clasp "Egypt" to all claimants from vessels that had been present between March and September. Minorca was among the vessels listed as qualifying.

== Fate ==
Minorca was paid off in April 1802, after the Treaty of Amiens ended the war with France. She was sold later that year.
