= HMS Malta (1800) =

Ship of the line of the Royal Navy

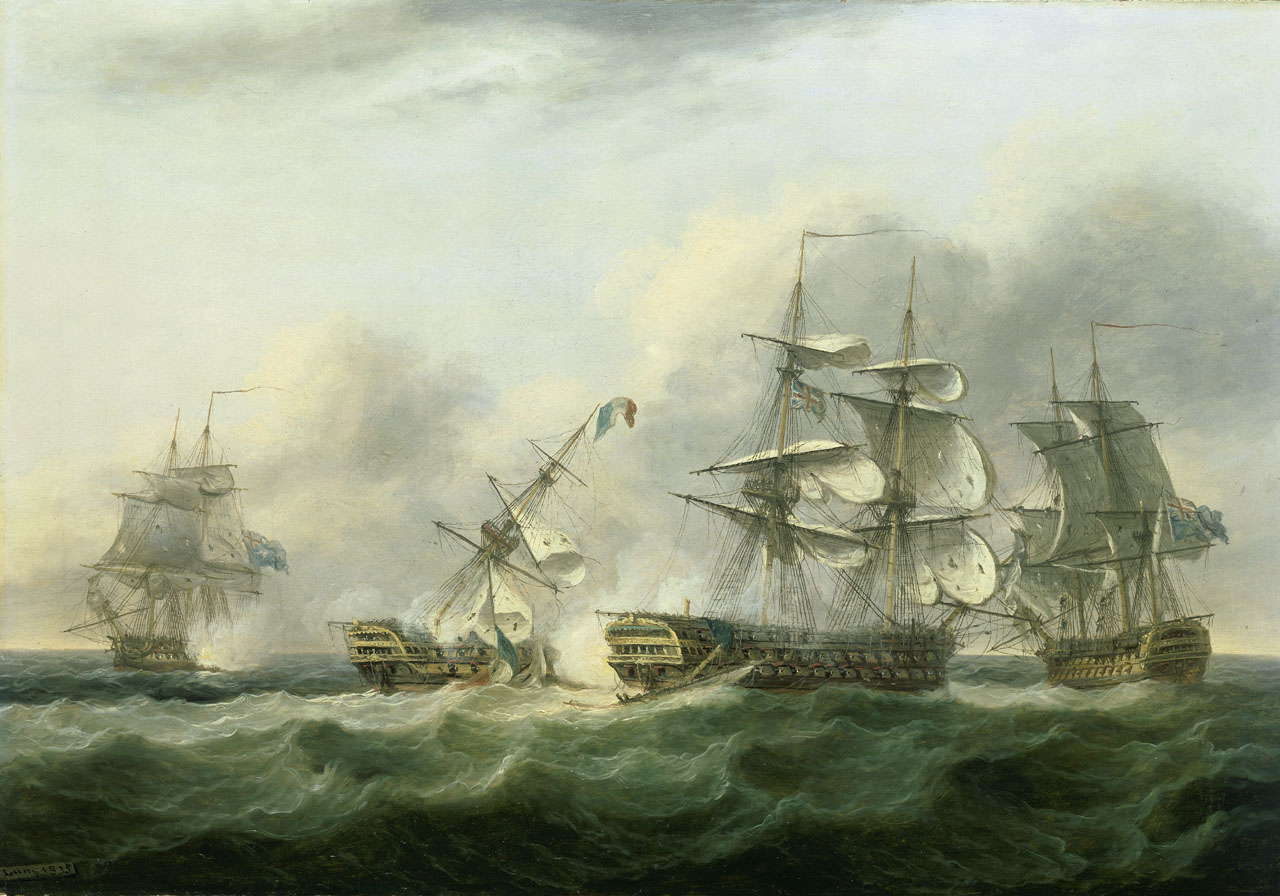
- Guillaume Tell (second from left) at the action of 31 March 1800

History

France
- Name: Guillaume Tell
- Builder: Toulon
- Laid down: September 1794
- Launched: 21 October 1795
- Completed: By July 1796
- Captured: 30 March 1800, by the Royal Navy

Great Britain
- Name: HMS Malta
- Acquired: 30 March 1800
- Fate: Broken up in August 1840

General characteristics
- Class & type: Tonnant-class ship of the line
- Displacement: 3,868 tonneaux
- Tons burthen: 2,034 port tonneaux; 2,265 9/94 bm
- Length: 194 ft 4 in (59.2 m) (overall); 159 ft 8 in (48.7 m) (keel)
- Beam: 51 ft 7.5 in (15.7 m)
- Depth of hold: 23 ft 4 in (7.11 m)
- Propulsion: Sails
- Sail plan: Full-rigged ship
- Complement: 780
- Armament: French service; 30 × 36-pounder long guns; 32 × 24-pounder long guns; 18 × 12-pounder long guns; 4 × obusiers de vaisseau; British service: Lower deck: 30 × 32-pdrs + 2 × 68-pdr carronades; Upper deck: 30 × 24-pdrs; Quarterdeck: 18 × 24-pdrs + 8 × 24-pdr carronades; Forecastle: 2 × 12-pdrs; RH: 2 × 68-pdr carronades + 2 × 24-pdr carronades

HMS Malta was an 80-gun third rate ship of the line of the Royal Navy. She had previously served with the French Navy as the Tonnant-class Guillaume Tell, but was captured in the Mediterranean in 1800 by a British squadron enforcing the blockade of French-occupied Malta. Having served the French for less than four years from her completion in July 1796 to her capture in March 1800, she would eventually serve the British for forty years.

Guillaume Tell took part in the Battle of the Nile, but formed part of the rear of the French fleet and saw little action. She became one of only two French ships of the line to escape the destruction of the fleet, and took refuge at Malta. She was trapped there by the British blockade, and as the island began to fall to the British, she attempted to escape. She was spotted by a patrolling British frigate and attacked, with nearby British ships of the line joining the action. After a fierce fight she struck her colours and was taken by the British. Renamed HMS Malta after the island she was captured off she served in the Channel, the Atlantic and the Mediterranean.

She fought with Vice-Admiral Robert Calder's fleet at the Battle of Cape Finisterre in 1805, contributing to the capture of two enemy ships. Transferred to take part in the blockade of the French ports, she helped in the chase and capture of the French frigate Président in 1806. The last years of the war were spent as a flagship in the Mediterranean, after which she returned to Britain. She spent some time as the Plymouth guardship, and remained on active service until being reduced to a harbour depot ship, in which role she spent nearly a decade. She was finally broken up in 1840, forty years after her capture from the French.

== Construction and French career ==
=== Nile ===
Guillaume Tell was built to a design by Jacques-Noël Sané at the Toulon shipyard between September 1794 and July 1796, having been launched on 21 October 1795. She was named after the folk hero William Tell. Flagship of Rear-Admiral Pierre-Charles Villeneuve she was one of the ships that accompanied Vice-Admiral François-Paul Brueys's fleet, carrying Napoleon Bonaparte and the French troops to invade Egypt. Guillaume Tell was anchored with Brueys's fleet in Aboukir Bay on 1 August, when they were discovered in the evening by a British fleet under Rear-Admiral Horatio Nelson. Nelson ordered his fleet to attack immediately, with the British forces moving on the French van, doubling their line. Brueys was taken by surprise, having expected the British to attack his rear and centre, where he had consequently placed his heaviest ships, including the Guillaume Tell. Guillaume Tell formed part of the rear division and therefore remained out of the engagement until dawn, as the French van surrendered and the British ships moved down the line to engage the remaining ships.

Villeneuve fought on until midday on 2 August, before attempting to escape to sea with the remains of the French rear, including the Généreux and Timoléon, and two frigates, but the Timoléon ran aground and had to be abandoned. Villeneuve was later criticised for not using his initiative to bring the rear to support the van earlier in the attack, but pleaded that it would not have made a difference to the outcome. The four surviving French ships escaped to Malta, with Généreux returning from there to Toulon, but Guillaume Tell became trapped at Valletta by the British blockade.

=== Capture ===
Nelson's irritation that two of the French ships of the line at the Nile had escaped him was assuaged by interception of the Généreux in February 1800 while trying to protect a squadron attempting to break the blockade of Malta. Nelson wrote in a letter to Emma Hamilton 'I have got her - Le Genereux - thank God! 12 out of the 13, only the Guillaume Tell remaining: I am after the others.' Généreux was captured after a brief action, surrendering to Nelson's flag captain, Edward Berry. Nelson, by now infatuated with Emma Hamilton, and resisting his commanding officer Lord Keith's order to move his base of operations away from Palermo, left the blockade to his subordinates while he went ashore. While he was away, Guillaume Tell prepared for sea and got under way from Valletta at 11 at night on 29 March, flying the flag of Rear-Admiral Denis Decrès. Her departure was observed by Captain Henry Blackwood aboard the frigate HMS Penelope, who immediately engaged her, having dispatched the brig Minorca to bring up the rest of the blockading squadron.

By dawn on 30 March the 64-gun HMS Lion had closed and the two exchanged fire, with Lion's bowsprit becoming entangled in Guillaume Tell's rigging. The crew of Lion fought off two attempts to board by the French, before drifting away with her sails and rigging cut to pieces in order to repair the damage. Edward Berry's HMS Foudroyant came up at 6 in the morning, and after ordering Guillaume Tell to surrender, fired a broadside. Guillaume Tell had had her main and mizzen top masts shot away by Penelope, but resisted Foudroyant. The two ships exchanged broadsides while Penelope ranged up on Guillaume Tell's un-engaged quarter and opened fire. Now engaged on both sides, Guillaume Tell lost her foremast at 6.36 am, and her mainmast at 6.45 am. At about this time a French seaman nailed the French ensign to the stump of the mizzen-mast. Now engaged by all three British ships, the French ship fought on for another two hours, until completely dismasted and obliged to close her lower gunports to stop them flooding as the ship rolled helplessly. Realising that further resistance was useless, Decrès ordered the colours to be struck at 9.35 am.

== British career ==
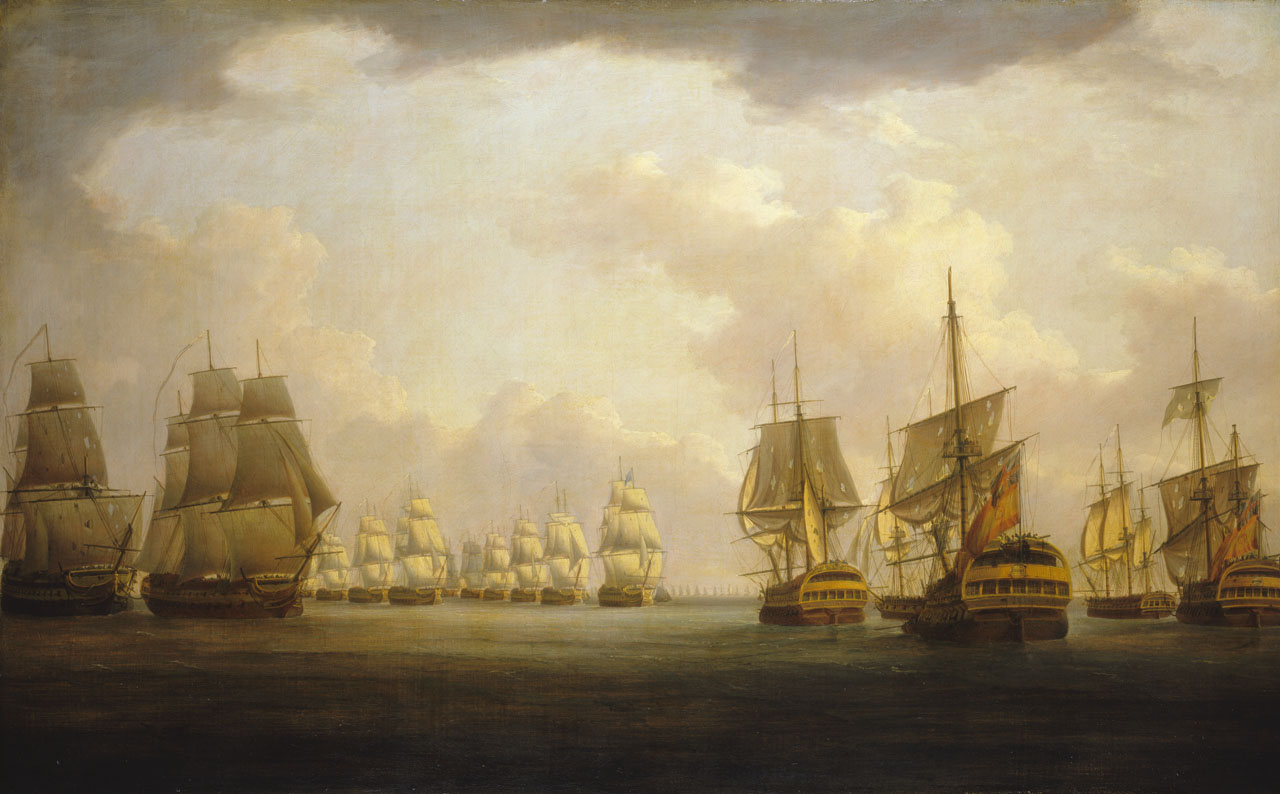
Admiral Sir Robert Calder's action off Cape Finisterre, 23 July 1805, by William Anderson

The badly damaged Guillaume Tell was taken in tow by Penelope, the only ship in any condition to remain at sea and arrived at Syracuse on 3 April. After being patched up she was sailed to Britain, arriving at Portsmouth on 23 November 1800. She was surveyed and fitted out there, a process completed by July 1801, during which time she was commissioned as HMS Malta in May under Captain Albemarle Bertie. She initially based in the roadstead off St Helens, but was damaged in a serious fire in April 1802 and was paid off for repairs. After these were completed she recommissioned in March 1803, on the outbreak of war, under the command of Captain Edward Buller. Buller was temporarily replaced in January 1805 by Captain William Granger for service off Cádiz, but Buller was back in command in time to take part in Calder's Action off Cape Finisterre on 22 July 1805. Malta formed the rear-most ship in the British line in the approach to the battle, but as the fleets became confused in the failing light and thick patchy fog, Buller found that he was surrounded by five enemy ships. After a fierce engagement in which Malta suffered five killed and forty wounded, Buller forced the Spanish 84-gun San Rafael to strike, and afterwards sent the Malta's boats to take possession of the Spanish 74-gun Firme.

Malta became the flagship of Rear-Admiral Sir Thomas Louis in August 1806, and was still serving with Louis' squadron when they were ordered to intercept a French force under Jean-Baptiste Philibert Willaumez that was expected to arrive in European waters from the Caribbean. On 27 September they came across the 44-gun French frigate Président, and after a pursuit, forced her to surrender. Malta departed for the Mediterranean on 5 January 1807 and spent the year participating in the blockade of Cádiz, with Buller being succeeded in command by Captain William Shield during the year. She blockaded Toulon in 1808, at first under Shield, and later under Captain Robert Otway. Returning home to Britain in December that year, she was paid off. Work began on a large repair at Plymouth in July 1809, after which she was fitted out for foreign service, a process completed by December 1811. She had recommissioned in September 1811 under the command of Captain Charles Paget to serve as the flagship of Rear-Admiral Sir Benjamin Hallowell in the Mediterranean. Malta sailed from Britain on 8 January 1812, and spent the next few years in the Mediterranean, passing under the command of Captain William Charles Fahie in January 1815. Fahie was in command of Malta when she took part in the successful attack on the Fortress of Gaeta during the July and August 1815.

With the end of the Napoleonic Wars she returned to Britain, where various defects were repaired and she was fitted out as the Plymouth guardship between November 1815 and January 1816. Captain Thomas Caulfield took command in January 1816 and remained in her until she was paid off in July 1816. Malta remained in active service until being fitted as a reserve depot ship at Plymouth in late 1831. She spent another nine years in the role until being broken up at Plymouth in August 1840.
