= HMS Lion (1777) =

Ship of the line of the Royal Navy

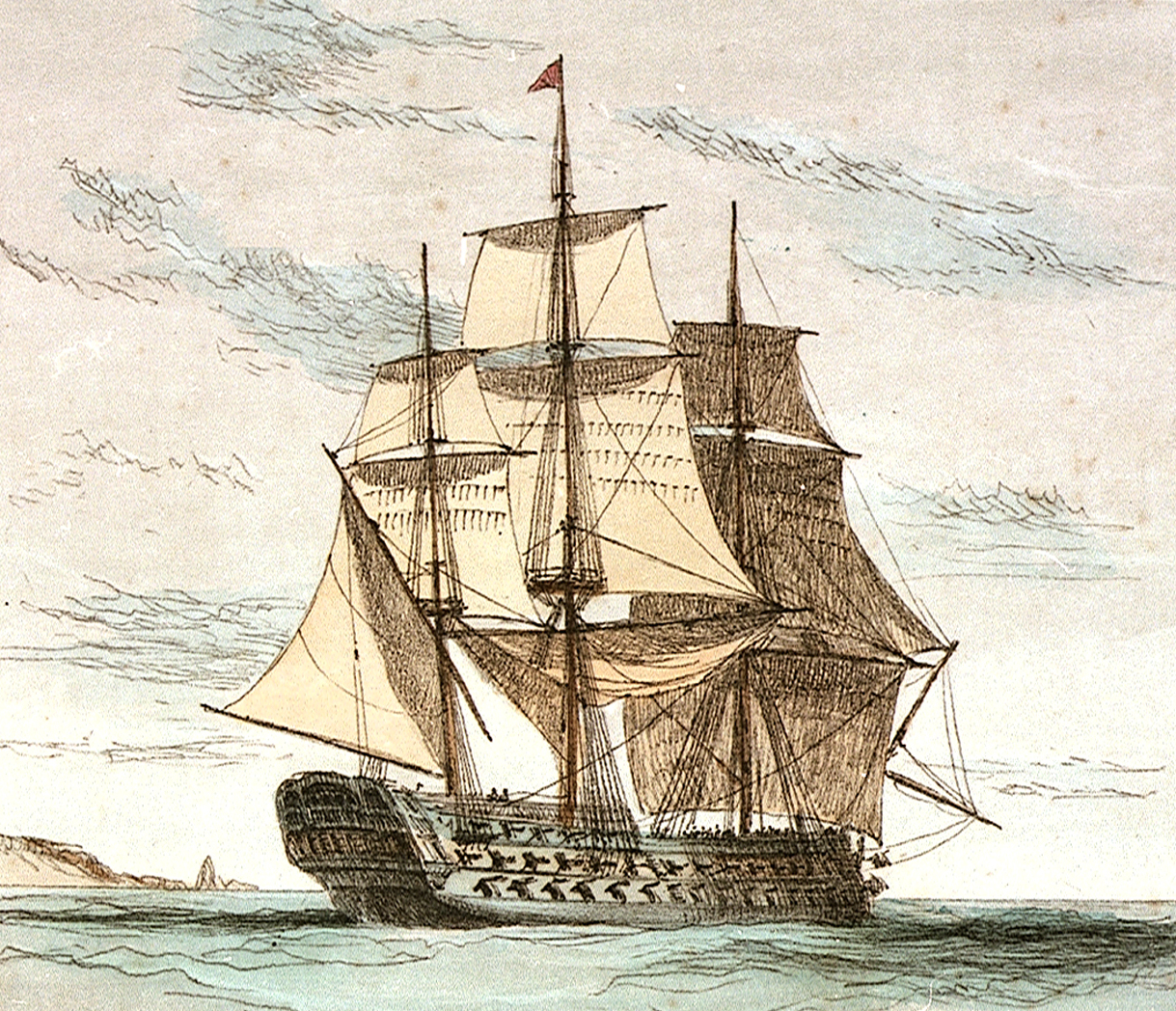
- Lion in 1794

History

Great Britain
- Name: HMS Lion
- Ordered: 12 October 1768
- Builder: Portsmouth Dockyard
- Laid down: May 1769
- Launched: 3 September 1777
- Honours and awards: Participated in: Battle of Grenada
- Fate: Sold for breaking up, 30 November 1837
- Notes: Sheer hulk from 1816

General characteristics
- Class & type: Worcester-class ship of the line
- Tons burthen: 1378 bm
- Length: 159 ft (48 m) (gundeck)
- Beam: 44 ft 6 in (13.56 m)
- Depth of hold: 19 ft 10 in (6.05 m)
- Propulsion: Sails
- Sail plan: Full-rigged ship
- Armament: Gundeck: 26 × 24-pounder guns; Upper gundeck: 26 × 18-pounder guns; QD: 10 × 4-pounder guns; Fc: 2 × 9-pounder guns

HMS Lion was a 64-gun Worcester class third-rate ship of the line of the Royal Navy. She was launched on 3 September 1777 at Portsmouth Dockyard.

== Career ==
=== American War of Independence ===
She fought at the Battle of Grenada under Captain William Cornwallis on 6 July 1779, where she was badly damaged and forced to run downwind to Jamaica. She remained on the Jamaica station for the next year.

On 20 March 1780, Lion fought an action in company with two other ships against a French convoy off Monte Cristi, Dominican Republic, protected by Toussaint-Guillaume Picquet de la Motte's squadron. The Lion and Cornwallis, then returned Nelson to England. On 20 June, a second action by Cornwallis, took place near Bermuda, when Cornwallis' Lion, accompanied by five other ships of the line, met another French convoy carrying six thousand troops for Rhode Island, and protected by Charles-Henri-Louis d'Arsac de Ternay. The French were too strong for Cornwallis's squadron, but were content to continue with their mission instead of attacking the smaller British force.

In 1782, Lion took part in the capture of the 28-gun French ship Aigle. Aigle was sailing in company with the 32-gun Gloire, and on 12 September, chased and captured the 14-gun brig HMS Racoon. Later in the day, the French frigates were spotted by a squadron comprising Lion, the 50-gun Warwick, the 28-gun Vestal and the 14-gun Bonnetta. The two French frigates fled and on 13 September, attempted to escape in the shallow waters around the Delaware where, despite the danger, the British followed. The Gloire, being of a lesser draught, got away but Aigle ran aground the next day. Surrounded by British ships and unable to return fire, Aigle struck her colours.

=== French Revolutionary Wars ===
In late July 1793, under the command of Captain Sir Erasmus Gower, Lion escorted the East Indiaman Hindostan, which carried the British ambassador Lord Macartney on his way to visit the Qianlong Emperor of China (the Macartney embassy).

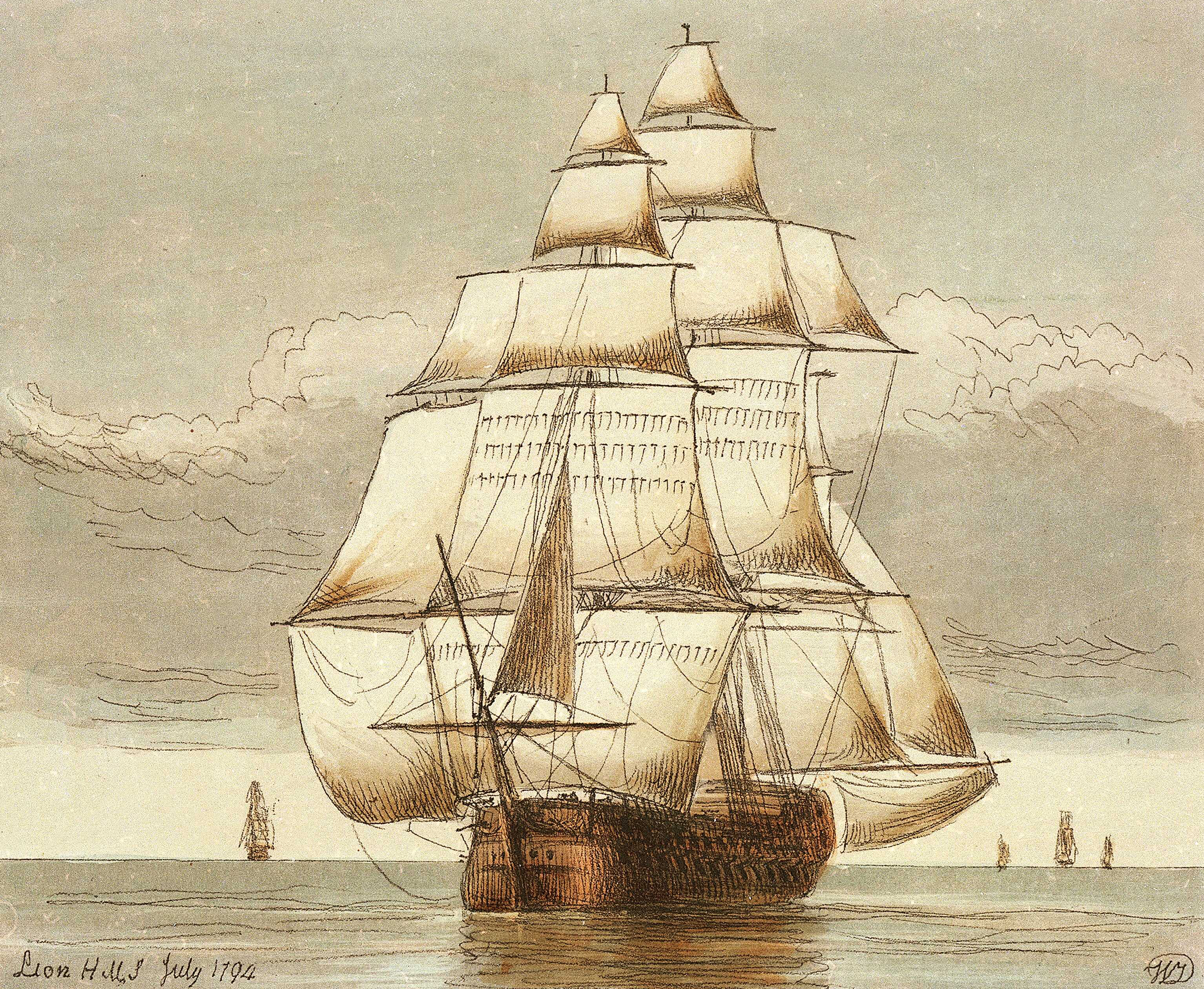
Lion under sail in 1794

On their way they stopped at New Amsterdam Island or Île Amsterdam. There they found a gang of seal fur hunters under the command of Pierre François Péron. Later, Lion captured the French ship Emélie, the vessel that had landed the sealers. Deprived of the ship that had landed them, Péron and his men spent some 40 months marooned on the island until Captain Thomas Hadley, in Ceres, rescued them in late 1795 and took them to Port Jackson.

Between 1792 and 1794 she carried Lord George Macartney on a special embassy to China. The embassy proceeded to the Bohai Gulf, off the Hai River. The ambassador and his party were conveyed up river by light craft to Tianjin before proceeding by land to Beijing On reaching Tianjin, Macartney sent orders to Lion to proceed to Japan, but because of sickness among the crew she was unable to do so. The embassy rejoined Lion at Canton in December 1793. The ship's journal from this voyage is in the library of Cornell University.

In 1796, she visited Cape Town; in 1797, her crew were among those who joined the Mutiny at the Nore. In 1798, now under the command of Sir Manley Dixon, Lion fought a squadron of Spanish frigates at the action of 15 July 1798 and captured Santa Dorotea.

She then took part in the siege of Malta, and with HMS Penelope and HMS Foudroyant captured the French 80-gun ship Guillaume Tell as she tried to escape from the blockade (Guillaume Tell was subsequently bought into the Royal Navy as HMS Malta).

In July 1807 in the Malacca Strait she successfully protected from the French frigate Sémillante, without an engagement, a convoy homeward bound from China.

On 27 December 1807 Lion captured the French privateer lugger Reciprocité off Beachy Head. She was from Dieppe, had a crew of 45 men, and was armed with 14 guns. Lion sent her into the Downs.

In 1811, under the command of Captain Henry Heathcote, Lion was one of a large fleet of ships involved in the capture of Java from Dutch forces.

On 26 January 1812 Commander Henderson Bain of Harpy became acting captain of Lion. Bain returned to command of Harpy a few weeks before he received promotion to post captain 6 April 1813.

Lion was converted to a sheer hulk in September 1816, following the end of the Napoleonic Wars.

== Fate ==
Lion was sold to be broken up at Chatham on 30 November 1837.
