= Mediterranean campaign of 1798 =

Failed French military campaign

- Part of the War of the Second Coalition
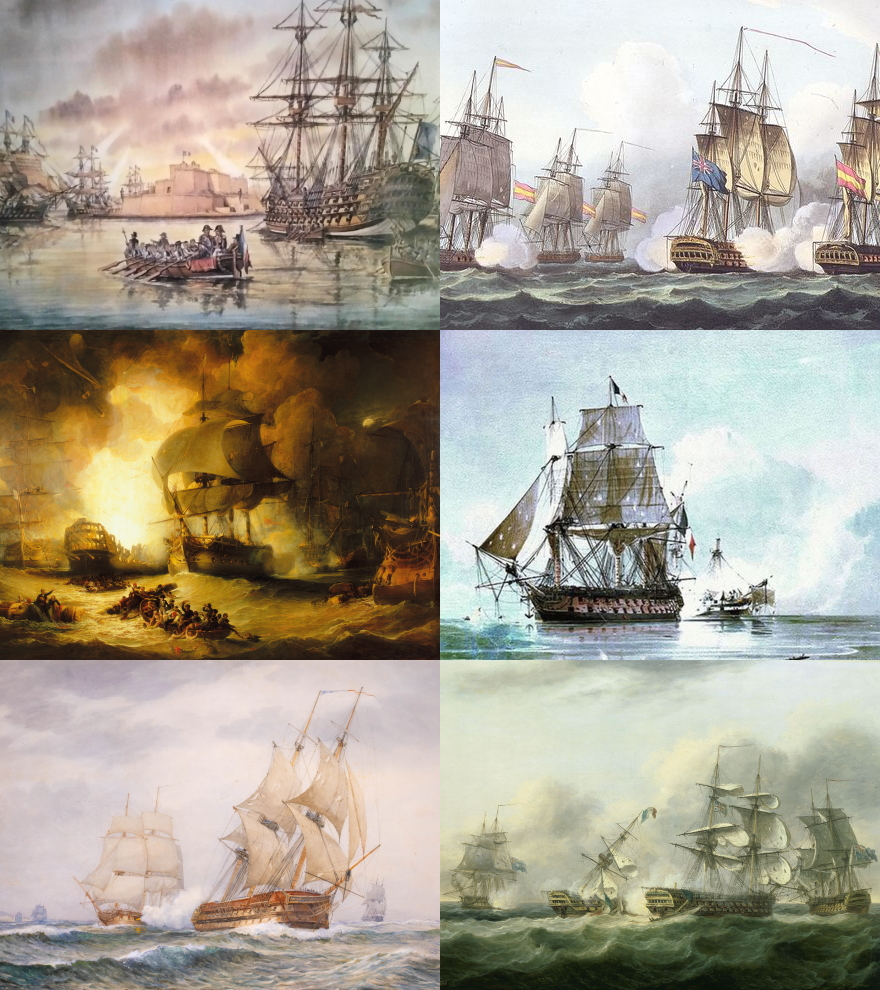
- Mediterranean campaign of 1798 Click an image to load the appropriate article. Left to right, top to bottom: Battles of Malta, 15 July 1798, the Nile, 18 August 1798, the Malta Convoy, 31 March 1800
Date	June – December 1798
Location	Mediterranean Sea
Result	Coalition victory

Belligerents
Great Britain; After June 1798: Portugal; Russia; Ottoman Empire; Kingdom of Naples (Sovereign Military Order of Malta) Hospitaller Malta	France; Spain

Commanders and leaders
Sir Horatio Nelson (Russian Empire) Fyodor Ushakov (Note: Ushakov's Mediterranean Campaign: • Siege of Corfu (1798–1799)) (Portugal) Marquess of Nisa (Sovereign Military Order of Malta) Ferdinand von Hompesch zu Bolheim (surrendered) (Ottoman Empire) Ali Pasha of Yanina	(French First Republic) Napoleon Bonaparte (French First Republic) François-Paul Brueys D'Aigalliers † (French First Republic) Thomas-Alexandre Dumas

The Mediterranean campaign of 1798 was a series of major naval operations surrounding a French expeditionary force sent to Egypt under Napoleon Bonaparte during the French Revolutionary Wars. The French Republic sought to capture Egypt as the first stage in an effort to threaten British India and support Tipu Sultan, and thus force Great Britain to make peace. Departing Toulon in May 1798 with over 40,000 troops and hundreds of ships, Bonaparte's fleet sailed southeastwards across the Mediterranean Sea. They were followed by a small British squadron under Rear-Admiral Sir Horatio Nelson, later reinforced to 13 ships of the line, whose pursuit was hampered by a lack of scouting frigates and reliable information. Bonaparte's first target was the island of Malta, which was under the government of the Knights of St. John and theoretically granted its owner control of the Central Mediterranean. Bonaparte's forces landed on the island and rapidly overwhelmed the defenders, securing the port city of Valletta before continuing to Egypt. When Nelson learned of the French capture of the island, he guessed the French target to be Egypt and sailed for Alexandria, but passed the French during the night of 22 June without discovering them and arrived off Egypt first.

Unable to find Bonaparte, Nelson turned back across the Mediterranean, eventually reaching Sicily on 19 July. While Nelson was returning westwards, Bonaparte reached Alexandria and stormed the city, capturing the coast and marching his army inland. His fleet, entrusted to Vice-Admiral François-Paul Brueys D'Aigalliers, was anchored in a line of battle in Aboukir Bay. On 1 August, Nelson, who had returned to the Egyptian coast after reports gathered at Coron revealed the French invasion, arrived off Aboukir Bay. Although it was late afternoon and the British fleet had no accurate charts of the bay, Nelson ordered an immediate attack on the French van. Brueys was unprepared, and his ships were unable to manoeuvre as the British split into two divisions and sailed down either side of the French line, capturing all five ships of the vanguard and engaging his 120-gun flagship Orient in the centre. At 21:00, Orient caught fire and exploded, killing most of the crew and ending the main combat. Sporadic fighting continued for the next two days, until all of the French ships had been captured, destroyed or fled. At the Battle of the Nile, eleven French ships of the line and two frigates were eliminated, trapping Bonaparte in Egypt and changing the balance of power in the Mediterranean.

With the French Navy in the Mediterranean defeated, other nations were encouraged to join the Second Coalition and go to war with France. Portugal, the Kingdom of Naples, the Russian Empire and the Ottoman Empire all subsequently deployed forces to the Mediterranean. The Russians and Turks participated in the blockade of Egypt and operations in the Adriatic Sea while the Portuguese joined the Siege of Malta, which was distantly conducted by Nelson from his lodgings in Naples. Nelson, who had been wounded at the Battle of the Nile, became involved in Neapolitan politics and encouraged King Ferdinand to go to war with France, resulting in the loss of his mainland kingdom. In the Western Mediterranean, Vice-Admiral Earl St Vincent, who commanded the Mediterranean fleet from off Cádiz, deployed forces against Menorca, rapidly captured the island and turned it into an important naval base.

== Background ==
=== Bonaparte's plan ===
At the beginning of 1798, the War of the First Coalition had come to an end with French control of Northern Italy, much of the Low Countries and the Rhineland confirmed by the Treaty of Campo Formio. Of all the major European powers that had at one time allied against the French Republic, only the Kingdom of Great Britain remained hostile, and the French Directory determined to end the French Revolutionary Wars by eliminating Britain. A series of invasions of the British Isles were planned, and the 28-year-old General Napoleon Bonaparte, who had defeated the Austrians in Italy the previous year, was assigned to lead the Armée d'Angleterre (Army of England) that had been assembled at Boulogne. However, the English Channel was firmly controlled by the Royal Navy and French invasion supplies, particularly of viable landing craft, were totally inadequate for the purpose.

In the early spring of 1798, Bonaparte left his command at Boulogne and returned to Paris, reporting that continued British naval supremacy in Northern European waters made an invasion impossible in the near future. With operations to the north impossible, Bonaparte directed his attention southwards to Toulon, the principal French seaport on the Mediterranean. There a French army and fleet had begun assembling for a secret location, speculated by French commentators to be aimed at a wide variety of places, including among others Britain, Sicily, Malta and the Crimea. The expedition's intended target was actually Egypt, which formed an important link in the chain of communications between Britain and the economically vital colony of British India. Bonaparte considered the capture of Egypt as the most important step in neutralising the massive economic benefits that Britain gained from trade with India and bringing Britain to terms: in August 1797 he wrote "The time is not far away that we will feel that, in order to truly destroy England, we must take Egypt." Possession of Egypt could grant the French control of the Eastern Mediterranean and the Red Sea, forcing severe delays to dispatches sent between Britain and India and obstructing trade worth £2.7 million (the equivalent of £300,000,000 as of 2025) to the British economy. In addition, a successful invasion of Egypt could be followed by a direct attack on British territory in India, possibly in conjunction with the anglophobic Tippoo Sultan of Seringapatam. The French Mediterranean Fleet was unopposed at the start of 1798 – following the Treaty of San Ildefonso in 1796, in which Spain formed an alliance with France and declared war on Britain, the Royal Navy had withdrawn from the Mediterranean bases of Corsica and Elba. By early 1798, their Mediterranean Fleet was based at the Tagus River in Portugal, their one remaining continental ally. With no permanent British fleet in the Mediterranean and an uprising imminent in Ireland, Bonaparte firmly believed that the Royal Navy would be unable to intervene in his plans, even if they should discover them.

With passage to Egypt seemingly unopposed Bonaparte gave orders for a fleet of thirteen ships of the line, led by the 120-gun Orient under Vice-Admiral François-Paul Brueys D'Aigalliers and numerous smaller warships, including the entire Venetian Navy, captured the previous year, to prepare for sea. The fleet was to be accompanied by up to 400 transport ships, which were to carry the 35,000 men detailed for the invasion. On 3 May, Bonaparte departed Paris, arriving at Toulon five days later to oversee the final preparations. On 9 May he reviewed the assembled army and gave a speech announcing that the expedition was bound for an unspecified foreign land. The speech was met with an enthusiastic response from his soldiers and a revised version subsequently appeared in Le Moniteur Universel and was widely distributed throughout France as a poster. Despite Bonaparte's pronouncement the French departure was delayed: a strong headwind prevented the fleet from sailing for another nine days, conditions finally lifting on 18 May that permitted the 22 warships and 120 transports that made up the French fleet to sail the following day.

=== St. Vincent's response ===
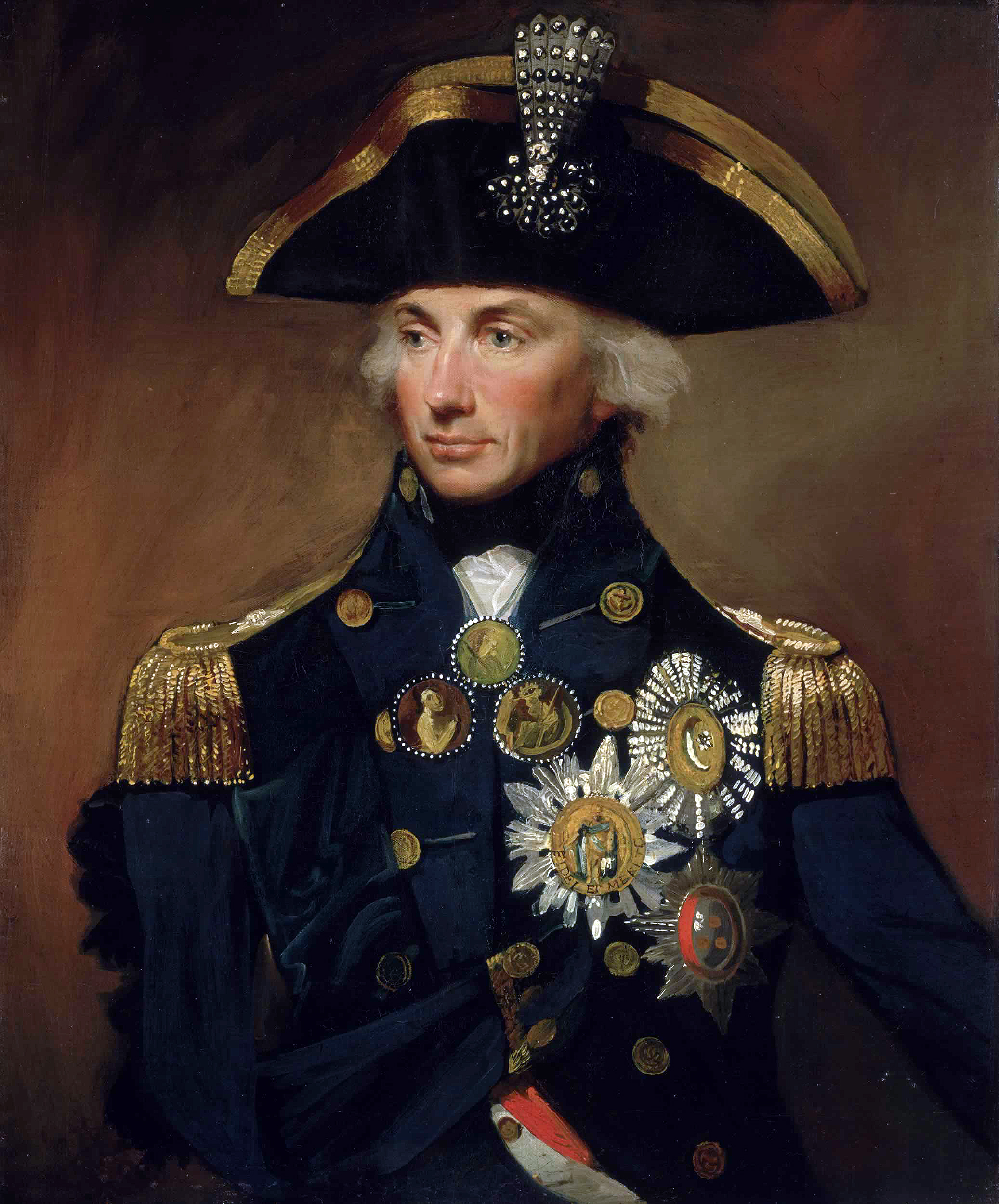
Rear-Admiral Sir Horatio Nelson, Lemuel Francis Abbott, 1800, National Maritime Museum

Britain was not unaware of French preparations at Toulon and along the Mediterranean coast, but despite sustained efforts by British agents in France the destination of the French fleet was unknown. Egypt was not seriously considered by the British government: when Secretary of State for War Henry Dundas suggested it, he was urged by Foreign Secretary Lord Grenville to think "with a map in your hand, and with a calculation of distances." Letters reached London and St. Vincent at the Tagus describing extensive preparations right along the French and Italian Mediterranean coastlines, but the distances between the base in the Tagus and Toulon prevented any sustained observation of French movements. Urgent orders were sent from Lord Spencer at the Admiralty to Vice-Admiral Earl St. Vincent, commander of the British Mediterranean Fleet at the Tagus, to despatch a squadron to investigate under the command of Rear-Admiral Sir Horatio Nelson. Nelson had returned to the fleet three days earlier at Lord Spencer's order, following recovery in Britain from the loss of an arm at the Battle of Santa Cruz de Tenerife in July 1797.

St. Vincent had already been preparing for an expedition to Toulon with Nelson in mind, and the rear-admiral departed the Tagus in his flagship HMS Vanguard on 2 May. St Vincent was overjoyed to be able to place Nelson in command of the mission, writing that "the arrival of Admiral Nelson has given me new life ... his presence in the Mediterranean is so very essential". His preference for Nelson over the more senior admirals Sir William Parker and Sir John Orde provoked a storm of protest, which eventually culminated in Orde challenging St Vincent to a duel, and being subsequently ordered to return to Britain. On 9 May Nelson collected the ships of the line HMS Alexander and HMS Orion under Captains Alexander Ball and Sir James Saumarez the frigates HMS Emerald and HMS Terpsichore under Captains Thomas Moutray Waller and William Hall Gage and the sloop HMS Bonne Citoyenne under Captain Robert Retalick at Gibraltar, and passed into the Mediterranean. Despite leaving under cover of darkness, Nelson's departure was observed by Spanish forces at Cadiz, and the fort at Cape Carnero fired several shot, striking Alexander but inflicting negligible damage.

On 17 May Terpsichore captured the privateer La Pierre off Cape Sicié, and from the crew Nelson learned that Bonaparte's departure was imminent, although the destination was still unknown. On 21 May, as his squadron reached the Îles d'Hyères near Toulon, they were struck by strong winds that snapped Vanguard's topmasts and brought the wreckage down onto the deck, killing two men. Vanguard was left struggling in heavy seas, blown 75 nautical miles (139 km) southwards in one night. So severe was the damage that Vanguard was almost wrecked on the Corsican coast on the following day and Nelson even ordered Captain Ball, who had managed to attach a towline to the flagship, to abandon him. Ball refused the order and the British ships of the line rode out the storm together. Although Alexander was able to tow Vanguard to San Pietro Island off Sardinia for repairs, the gale had forced the squadron's frigates to separate from the larger ships.

Thomas Waller on Emerald was divided from the other frigates, and his lookouts had observed Vanguard in its dismasted state at the height of the storm. The other two frigates had reefed their sails and ridden out the storm together, Captain Gage turning towards the Spanish coast when the storm abated and on 29 May encountered HMS Alcmene under Captain George Johnstone Hope, which had been sent by St. Vincent to augment Nelson's force. Two days later Hope's squadron encountered Emerald, which had captured two merchant ships, and together they sailed for the prearranged rendezvous point 60 miles (97 km) off Cape St. Sebastian near Barcelona. Hope ordered Terpsichore and Bonne Citoyenne to cruise off Sardinia and on 3 June encountered the brig HMS Mutine under Captain Thomas Hardy, the scout of a fleet sent by Earl St. Vincent that was approaching the rendezvous. Knowing of the damaged suffered by Vanguard and aware that the French had left Toulon, Hope then took the unilateral decision to search for the French himself, dispersing the frigates across the Western Mediterranean. Hope's ships failed to find either the British or French fleets and none of the frigates returned to Nelson's command until after the Battle of the Nile.

== Malta ==
Departing Toulon on 19 May, Bonaparte's fleet passed along the coast of Provence to Genoa, where 72 additional transport ships were collected. Sailing south, the fleet reached Corsica on 23 May and collected a fleet of 22 transports from Ajaccio on 28 May. The convoy remained within sight of the eastern coastline until 30 May, crossing the Strait of Bonifacio and following the coastline of Sardinia in anticipation of combining with fleets of transports sailing from Civitavecchia. On 3 June, a message reached Bonaparte reporting the presence of Nelson's squadron at San Pietro and the French general sent a French squadron to investigate, although by that time Nelson had sailed and the harbour was empty. Abandoning the wait for the Civitavecchia force, which had still not arrived, Bonaparte gave orders for his fleet to turn southeast, passing Mazara on Sicily and the island of Pantelleria on 7 June. There a report from a captured British merchant brig warned Bonaparte that Nelson was only a short distance behind his force with a powerful Royal Navy fleet and, concerned for his transports, Bonaparte gave urgent orders for the French fleet to steer for Malta, arriving off Valletta at 05:30 on 9 June, shortly after uniting with the 56 ships of the Civitavecchia convoy, which had missed the rendezvous and continued to Malta alone.

The report on Nelson's activity submitted to Bonaparte on 7 June was inaccurate: Repairs to Vanguard in San Pietro took six days, the squadron sailing on 27 May for Toulon, arriving off the harbour on 31 May. (Note: Richard Woodman suggests that Nelson deliberately allowed Bonaparte to sail from Toulon in order to have the opportunity to engage and destroy him at sea. This is incorrect: as noted by Oliver Warner, Nelson did not have the forces or the ability to intercept Bonaparte until 12 days after the French convoy had sailed. The same tactic has been suggested by historian Peter Padfield regarding Lord Howe's intentions in the days before the Glorious First of June in 1794.) Nelson had already learned of the departure of the French fleet from a captured Marseille merchant ship, but without reinforcements or knowledge of the French direction he could not begin a pursuit. On 5 June, the brig HMS Mutine arrived off Toulon and reported that a British fleet was only a few days away, consisting of ten ships of the line and a fourth rate sent by Earl St Vincent from the Tagus on 24 May under Captain Thomas Troubridge in HMS Culloden. St Vincent, acting under urgent orders from London to send a fleet to the Mediterranean had opted to split his forces, rather than risk taking all of his ships into the Mediterranean and leaving the Spanish at Cadiz unattended. Troubridge was considered by St Vincent to be the best officer in the fleet, and Nelson, who also held a high opinion of Troubridge, immediately sailed his squadron to the scheduled rendezvous point. On 6 June, his squadron briefly intercepted a Spanish merchant convoy and captured two ships, before the admiral called off the pursuit to ensure he arrived at the agreed time. On 7 June at 12:00 the fleets combined, Nelson now commanding 13 74-gun ships of the line, one 50-gun ship and one brig. Noticeable by their absence were frigates, vital for scouting operations in a campaign of this nature; After his encounter with Hope, Hardy reported to Nelson that the frigates were cruising independently, to which the admiral bitterly responded "I had thought that Hope would have known me better".

=== Nelson's search ===
Delayed until 10 June by a calm and still unaware of French intentions, Nelson initially sailed along the Corsican coast, before anchoring at Elba on 12 June and sending Mutine into Civitavecchia for information. Hardy was unable to discover the French destination and, after a detour to Elba with his whole fleet, Nelson continued south. Two days later, the admiral spoke with a Tunisian ship at Giannutri, which passed on the inaccurate information that the French had been seen off Trapani, and might be anchored at Syracuse. On 17 June Nelson anchored at the Pontine Islands off Naples and sent Troubridge ashore to appeal to the British ambassador Sir William Hamilton for information and for the assistance of the Neapolitan Navy in scouting for the French. Although the Neapolitan Prime Minister Sir John Acton had already passed on reports that the French were sailing for Egypt, Hamilton did not give the report to Nelson, possibly suspicious of disinformation. Hamilton did however relay the information that Bonaparte's fleet had passed Sardinia and were probably sailing in the direction of Malta. Despite private animosity towards France, the Neapolitan government refused to openly join the British in the war and denied Nelson the use of their frigates, although they did quietly agree to resupply Nelson's fleet. With a rough direction established and believing the ultimate French destination to be Sicily, Nelson sailed in pursuit, but light winds hampered his advances and he did not pass the Straits of Messina until 20 June. There he received a report from the ambassador at Messina that the French were at Malta. Then on 22 June near Cape Passaro, Hardy stopped a Genoese ship from Ragusa that reported seeing the French fleet sailing southwards away from Malta, and that they had left Valletta on 16 June. This information was wrong (or mistranslated) in one important respect: although preparations had begun on 16 June the French had actually not departed until 19 June, and Nelson's fleet was just 60 nautical miles (110 km) away from Brueys'. Nelson decided that the French target must be Egypt or Constantinople and called his senior captains: Saumarez, Ball, Troubridge and Henry Darby on board Vanguard for a conference. Together these officers determined Egypt as the most likely option, deducing that it was the best location in the Mediterranean from which Bonaparte could threaten India. Consequently, Nelson turned southeast towards Alexandria, exercising his men's gunnery daily to ensure they were ready for the battle he planned. His plan should his force encounter the French was clear: dividing into three squadrons, his fleet would strike the French at three points. Two squadrons of five ships each would engage the French fleet directly while the third would separate and attack the transports, sinking or capturing as many as possible. Nelson also deliberately forged close links with his captains at regular dinners aboard his flagship to ensure ease of communication and build confidence between them. He later said of this time that "I had the happiness to command a Band of Brothers."

=== Bonaparte at Malta ===
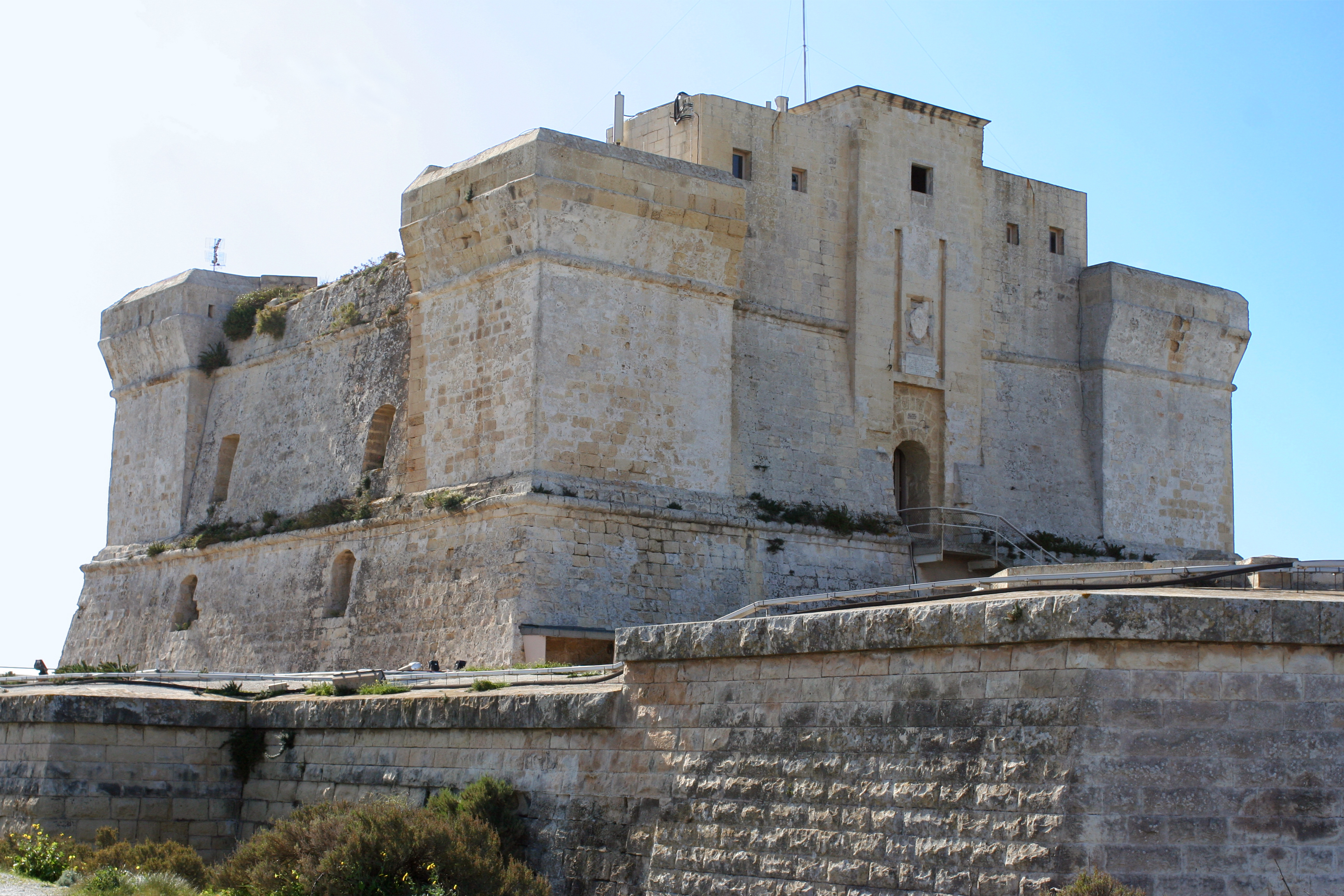
Fort Rohan, one of the few forts whose garrison fought against the French invasion of Malta

While Nelson was gathering his fleet and searching for the French, Bonaparte had secured the first stage of his plan for the invasion of Egypt. Arriving off Malta on 9 June, he demanded that the island's ruler, Ferdinand von Hompesch zu Bolheim, the Grand Master of the Knights Hospitaller (or Knights of St. John of Jerusalem) to allow his fleet to enter the harbour and purchase provisions. Hompesch refused, insisting that only two ships at a time could enter the port. Bonaparte responded by opening fire on the harbour defences and on 11 June landed soldiers at seven sites around Malta under General Louis Baraguey d'Hilliers. Coming under fire from the 2,000 native Maltese soldiers that mustered against the invasion, skirmishing continued in the western part of the island for 24 hours, until General Claude-Henri Belgrand de Vaubois entered Mdina and the defenders withdrew to the fortress of Valletta. The Maltese troops refused to continue the fight without support from their government, and negotiations followed in which Hompesch and the knights agreed to abandon Malta on condition of financial compensation amounting to 3 million Francs. In exchange, Bonaparte gained the entire Maltese archipelago, including fortresses, military stores and cannon, the small Maltese Navy and Army and the entire property of the Roman Catholic Church in Malta.

The Maltese position had already been severely weakened by the large number of Frenchmen who were part of the Order, who refused en masse to take up arms against Bonaparte. The French Revolution had already significantly reduced the Knights' income and their ability to put up serious resistance to Bonaparte was seriously compromised by a lack of resources. On 12 June, Bonaparte finally announced to his troops the destination of the expedition and on 19 June he sailed for Alexandria, initially steering east towards Crete. He left behind Vaubois and 4,000 men to maintain Malta as a base to control the Central Mediterranean. To ensure that news of the impending attack on Egypt did not spread ahead of the fleet, Brueys ordered that any merchant ships that sighted the convoy during the passage were to be seized and detained until his force had reached Alexandria. On 26 June, the British gained the first firm intelligence of French intentions, when the frigate HMS Seahorse under Captain Edward Foote encountered and captured the French frigate Sensible, which was returning to Toulon from Malta with a cargo of treasure and wounded soldiers, including General d'Hilliers. From these prisoners the destination of the French fleet was discovered and Seahorse, joined shortly afterwards by Terpsichore, sailed in pursuit, hoping to encounter Nelson.

== Arrivals at Alexandria ==
Nelson's passage from Sicily to Alexandria was uneventful, the journey taking six days. Due to his lack of frigates, Nelson was unable to scout to the flanks of his advance and as a result only spoke with three merchant ships, none of which had useful information about the French fleet. The lack of frigates had already had a decisive effect on 22 June, when the British fleet sighted four sails to the southeast. Although Captain Thomas Thompson of HMS Leander requested permission to investigate the strangers, Nelson refused and ordered his fleet to continue on their current heading, believing the French to be five days ahead and wishing to reach Alexandria as rapidly as possible. Had British frigates been available to approach and investigate the distant squadron, they might have discovered that they were scouts for the main French fleet, which was only a short distance away. The French frigate had sighted the British fleet and reported its presence to Bonaparte, who adjusted his convoy's direction slightly to a more northerly trajectory. As a result, Nelson's fleet passed north of the French to the east of Malta during the night in a heavy mist. Although Nelson was so close that his signal guns could be heard aboard Orient, his lookouts did not observe the French ships and the British fleet continued ahead without deviating. When dawn broke the following day, Bonaparte's diversion to the northeast had taken his convoy out of sight of the British fleet, which continued to the southeast undisturbed. On 28 June, Mutine arrived at Alexandria ahead of Nelson's fleet, and discovered that the French fleet was not in the harbour. Once the main fleet had arrived, attempts were made to contact the British Consul George Baldwin, but these failed as he had been dismissed by the British government shortly before and had left the city. As a result, official diplomatic channels were closed to Nelson. A message warning of the French approach was carried to the Ottoman governor Sayyid Muhammad Kurayyim by Hardy in Mutine. Kurayyim replied that he had not seen the French fleet, and that he would enforce the Ottoman Empire's neutrality and forbid both the British and the French from entering the harbour or landing on the coast. He was dismissive of the British warnings: "It is impossible that the French should come to our country. They have no business here and we are not at war with them." Without Baldwin no further entries could be made, and when there was still no sign of the French on the morning of 29 June, Nelson decided to turn back northeast and take another pass across the central Mediterranean towards Corfu, following a more northerly course than his first voyage.

=== Invasion of Egypt ===
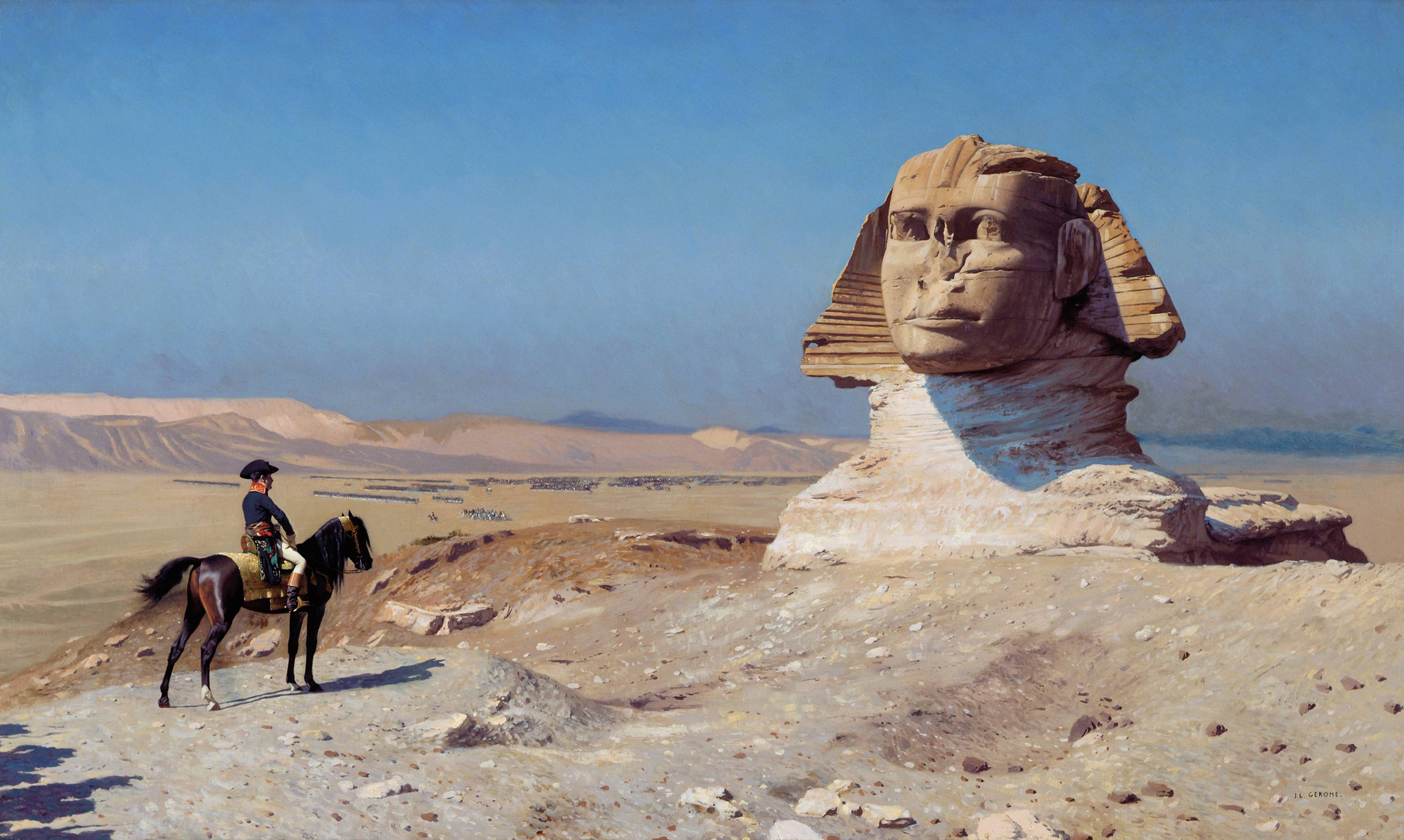
Bonaparte Before the Sphinx, Jean-Léon Gérôme, c. 1868, Hearst Castle, California

Bonaparte's fleet, delayed by its many transport ships, passed Cape Durazzo on the island of Crete during 30 June and reached Alexandria the following morning, driven by the fresh meltemi winds. Bonaparte's first action was to send a small brig into the harbour to collect the French consul, Charles Magallon, who relayed the news of Nelson's stay off the port and of Kurayyim's refusal to allow the French to land. Seriously concerned that Nelson might return while his men were still in their transports, Bonaparte gave orders for the landing to go ahead immediately. Soldiers were landed in the region of the Mirabou Creek, although the appearance of a sail to the east was mistaken for a scout from the British fleet and caused momentary panic, Bonaparte reportedly exclaiming: "Fortune, m'abandonnerais-tu? Quoi! Seulement cinq jours!" (Fortune, wilt thou abandon me? What! Only five days!). The newcomer was eventually revealed to be the French frigate Justice sent from Malta, and the invasion continued unopposed. By evening the landing had been completed, although several boats had been wrecked in the surf and Bonaparte himself estimated that at least 20 men had drowned.

On 2 July, Bonaparte led his men to victory in the brief Battle of Alexandria and secured the city. He placed General Jean Baptiste Kléber in command with Rear-Admiral Pierre Dumanoir le Pelley in charge of the harbour. Finding that entrances to the anchorage were too shallow to accommodate the main body of the French fleet, Bonaparte ordered Brueys to sail his squadron to the wider Aboukir Bay, 20 miles (32 km) northeast of Alexandria. Brueys was instructed that if he considered the anchorage to be unsafe then he was to sail for Corfu, leaving only a small light force that could anchor comfortably in Alexandria. There Brueys held a conference with his officers to decide on their response should Nelson discover them in the bay. Although Rear-Admiral Armand Blanquet of Franklin argued that the fleet was safest sailing out to meet the British, he was outvoted and overruled, Brueys ordering that the ships remain anchored in line of battle to receive the British attack. On 21 July, the frigates Seahorse and Terpsichore arrived at Alexandria and observed the French dispositions while flying French colours to confuse observers from the shore. With no sign of Nelson, Foote and Hall turned back westwards in search of the admiral. When Brueys learned that British frigates had been seen off the Egyptian coast, he decided that the retreat of these vessels signified that there was no danger of imminent attack by a British force and therefore failed to take precautions against attack.

=== Nelson returns ===
Nelson, having sailed northeast on the same day that the first French ships arrived off Alexandria, had reached Anatolia on 4 July and turned westward against the wind, sailing for Sicily again. His ships were briefly scattered by a storm on 5 July, before reconstituting the following day and on 18 July the British fleet reached Cape Passaro again and on 19 July Nelson's force anchored in Syracuse to take on fresh provisions supplied in part by Emma, Lady Hamilton, the wife of the ambassador to Naples. Frustrated, Nelson wrote in a letter to his wife Fanny; "Every moment I have to regret the frigates having left me, to which must be attributed my ignorance of the movements of the enemy." Reports subsequently reached the British fleet at Syracuse that the French had not been seen in the Eastern Mediterranean, in the Adriatic or in the Aegean Sea, leaving either Egypt or Syria as the only likely destinations. Sailing once more on 25 July, Nelson turned his ships east once again sailing for Morea and sending Troubridge in Culloden into Coron on 28 July for news. The Ottoman governor reported that the French had been seen sailing southwards from Crete at the start of the month and presented Troubridge with a French merchant ship that was anchored in the harbour. With their first definite sighting of the French, the British fleet turned southwards towards Alexandria.

== Battle of the Nile ==
On 1 August, Nelson's fleet reached the Egyptian coast, the ships HMS Swiftsure and HMS Alexander detached as scouts to investigate Alexandria harbour. Although the transport fleet was observed in the harbour, the French battle fleet was not. Despite initial disappointment, Nelson ordered his ships to search the coastline, and at 14:00 lookouts on HMS Zealous reported the French anchored in line of battle in Aboukir Bay. Brueys believed that his line, protected by shoals to the north and west, was impenetrable and that as a result the British would be forced to attack the rear and centre of his fleet. He consequently placed his strongest ships at these points, planning to stall the British fleet while his van used the prevailing northeasterly wind to counterattack. Brueys was also confident that the British fleet, strung out and with nightfall approaching, would not attack that day. He believed that Nelson would anchor off the bay and attack in the morning, giving Brueys time to prepare and leaving open the option of simply sailing away during the night, following Bonaparte's orders to avoid a direct confrontation with the British fleet.

=== Nelson's attack ===
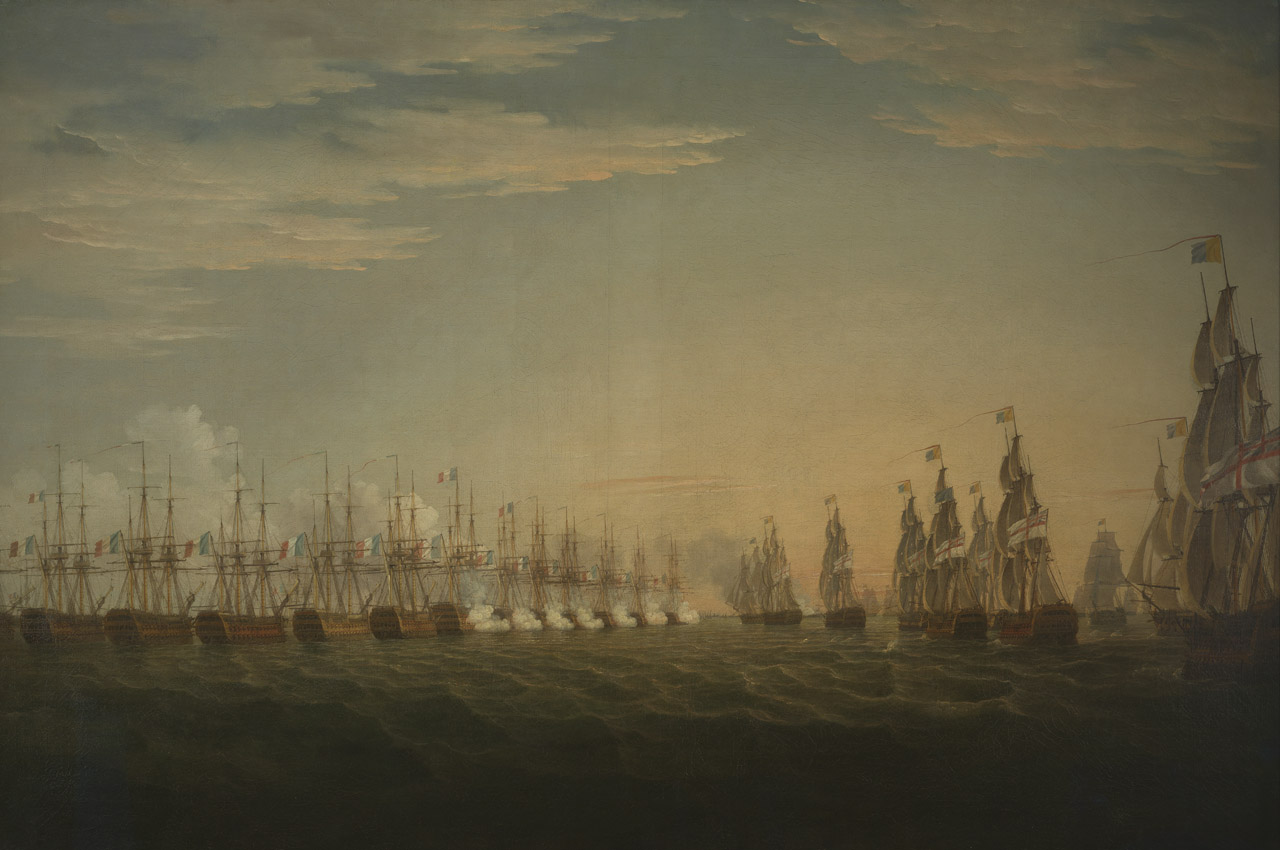
Battle of the Nile, Augt 1st 1798, Thomas Whitcombe. The British fleet bears down on the French line.

Despite Brueys hopes, Nelson was determined to press home his attack at once and ordered his ships to advance, only pausing to fit springs on their anchor cables, which would allow them to easily direct their broadsides in cramped, shallow coastal waters. Without an accurate chart of the bay, Nelson was forced to be cautious in his advance, and ordered Captain Samuel Hood in Zealous to take soundings as he advanced to establish the depth of the bay. At 18:20, as the British ships HMS Goliath and Zealous rounded the northern shoal, the leading French ships Guerrier and Conquérant opened fire. As he approached the French line, Captain Thomas Foley in Goliath noticed that Brueys had made a serious error in the distribution of his forces. Rather than place his lead ship Guerrier close to the northern shoal, the French admiral had left a gap, widened by the order for the French fleet to only anchor by the bow which meant that they drifted significantly, between Guerrier and the shoals. Sailing directly through this gap, Foley raked Guerrier and engaged the second ship of the French line, Conquérant. Zealous also passed through the gap and attacked Guerrier, and was followed by HMS Orion, HMS Theseus and HMS Audacious, all of which opened up a fierce fire on the first four French ships against their unprepared port sides.

Nelson followed in Vanguard, bringing the next two ships into action with the starboard side of the French van, catching the French ships in a crossfire that rapidly battered and dismasted the ships, despite determined defence. As the French van was destroyed, HMS Bellerophon and HMS Majestic attacked the French centre. Outnumbered and faced with the massed broadsides of Orient and the 80-gun Franklin and Tonnant, both British ships suffered massive damage. Culloden, bringing up the rear of the British line, passed too close to the northern shoal and grounded, Troubridge suffering severe damage to his hull despite efforts by Mutine and Leander to drag the ship off. By 19:00 darkness had fallen, and within an hour the French van had been defeated, Guerrier, Conquérant, Spartiate, Aquilon and Peuple Souverain all either in British hands or too badly damaged to continue fighting. The British too had suffered damage, with Vanguard and Goliath badly hit while to the south both Bellerophon and Majestic had been forced to cut their anchor cables and pull away from their respective opponents. Bellerophon had been dismasted, Majestic's captain George Blagden Westcott had been killed, and on Vanguard Nelson had suffered a severe head wound.

=== Destruction of Orient ===
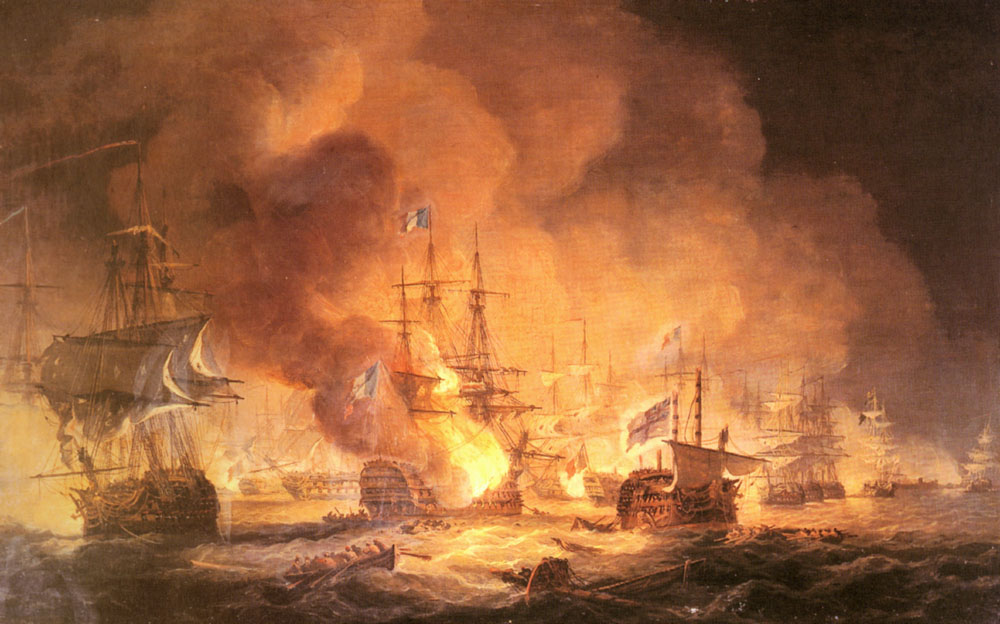
Battle of the Nile, Thomas Luny.

Shortly after 20:00, the trailing Swiftsure and Alexander, joined by Leander, attacked the French centre, causing severe damage to Franklin and killing Admiral Brueys on his quarterdeck with a cannon shot. At 21:00, a fire broke out in Orient's stern, the blaze spread further by volleys from Swiftsure that also defeated efforts to extinguish it. The flames spread rapidly, racing up the masts and across the decks until the entire flagship was a blazing wreck. At 22:00, the vast magazines detonated, tearing the ship apart and hurling burning wreckage onto the neighbouring vessels. For ten minutes not a shot was fired, as the nearest ships battled to extinguish fires and the further ones paused in shock. The first ship to recommence hostilities was Franklin, but Admiral Blanquet's heavily outnumbered flagship was forced to surrender by 24:00. Tonnant, the only French ship still engaged, fought on against Majestic until 03:00, when the mortally wounded Captain Aristide Aubert Du Petit Thouars succeeded in dragging his ship to the temporary safety of the rear division under Rear-Admiral Pierre-Charles Villeneuve.

At 04:00 on 2 August, firing began again between Villeneuve's ships and a scratch British squadron formed from the less damaged ships. By 11:00, Villeneuve had conducted a successful fighting withdrawal to the mouth of the bay, and was able to escape to open water. However, Villeneuve had been forced to abandon the battered Tonnant and the grounded Timoléon, retaining just two ships of the line and two frigates. While Villeneuve escaped, British ships received the surrender of Heureux and Mercure, which had grounded shortly after the explosion of Orient, and forced the captain of the frigate Artémise to scuttle his vessel. On 3 August, Theseus and Leander were sent to complete the destruction of the French fleet; Tonnant surrendered and Timoléon was set on fire by its crew and destroyed.

== Subsequent operations ==
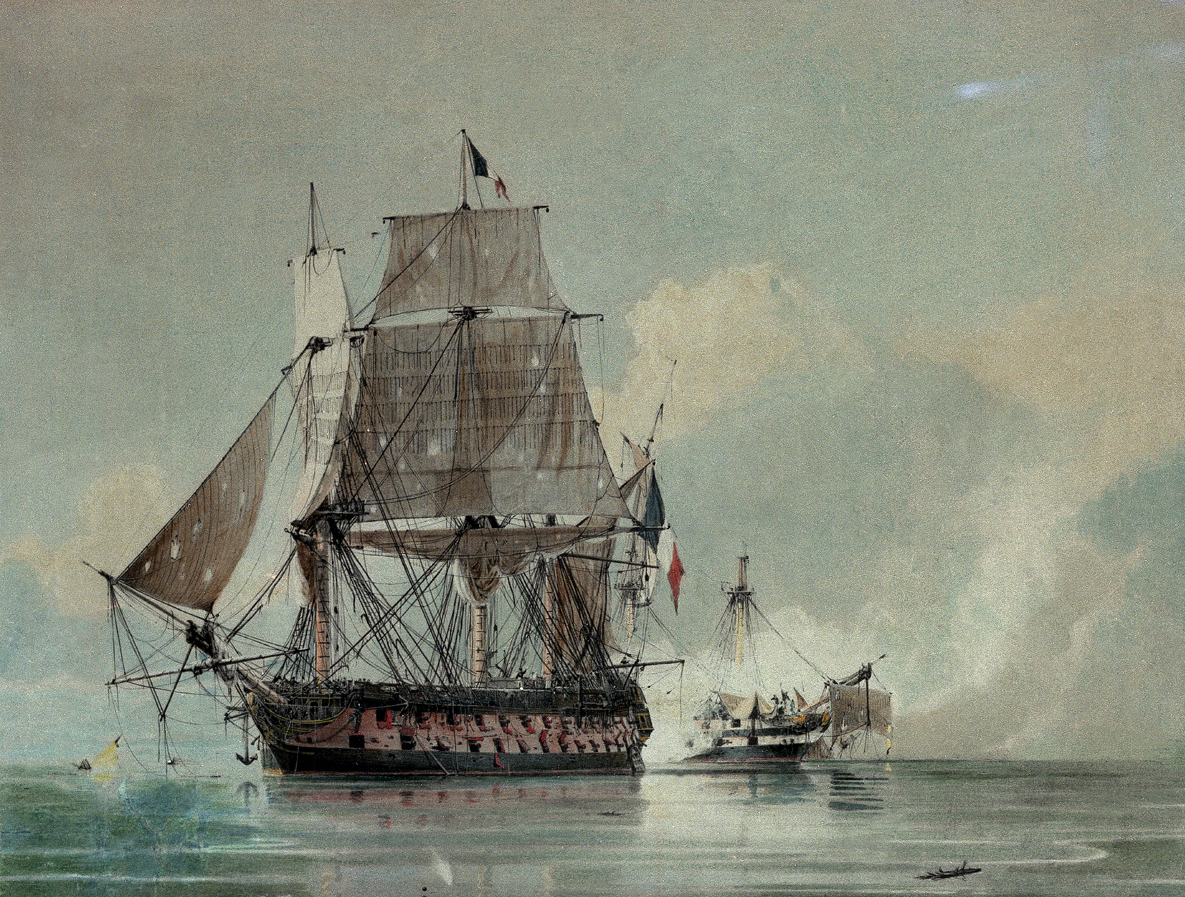
Action between H.M.S. Leander and the French National Ship Généreux, 18 August 1798, Charles Henry Seaforth

With the exception of Villeneuve's fugitives, the French Mediterranean Fleet had been annihilated. Nine of eleven ships of the line had been captured or destroyed, as well as two frigates. French casualties totalled more than 3,000 and possibly as many as 5,000, compared to British losses of 218 killed and 677 wounded. However, many of Nelson's ships were seriously damaged, and urgent repairs were required for both his own ships and the captured prizes before they could begin the long voyage back to Britain. For more than two weeks Nelson remained in Aboukir Bay, effecting repairs, writing despatches and assessing the strategic situation in Egypt. The first ship detached from his squadron was Leander, sent on 5 August to the fleet under Earl St. Vincent off Cádiz with reports of the battle. On 8 August Aboukir Island was stormed and captured, and on 12 August Emerald, Alcmene and Bonne Citoyenne finally caught up with the fleet, followed on 17 August by Seahorse and Terpsichore. Mutine was detached on 13 August with despatches for the Admiralty and on 14 August Nelson sent seven ships with the six seaworthy prizes to the mouth of Aboukir Bay under the command of Saumarez. This convoy sailed for Gibraltar on 15 August and the following day Nelson burnt Heureux, followed on 18 August by Mercure and Guerrier, none of which were fit for continued service. On 19 August Nelson separated his remaining ships, leading three vessels northwards towards Naples and leaving a blockade squadron off Alexandria of Zealous, Goliath, Swiftsure and the frigates, under Captain Samuel Hood.

By the time Nelson departed Alexandria, his first set of dispatches were already in French hands. Leander had been discovered off the western coast of Crete on 18 August 1798 by the French ship of the line Généreux, one of Villeneuve's escapees. After separating from Villeneuve's squadron on 17 August, Généreux was sailing to Corfu when it encountered the British fourth rate. The larger French ship soon overtook the British vessel and a heated exchange followed: French efforts to board Leander were driven back with heavy casualties, and Captain Thompson at one stage successfully raked his opponent, but gradually the heavier weight of Généreux inflicted severe damage to the British ship and after six and a half hours Thompson was forced to surrender. French captain Lejoille then authorised widespread looting of the personal effects of the British crew, whom he also forced to conduct repairs on both ships, an act against the established conventions of naval warfare. The prize was towed to Corfu for repairs, the two battered vessels briefly encountering Mutine, which escaped to the westwards before Généreux could give chase. In captivity Lejoille continued to refuse to allow the British officers medical attention or return their stolen property. Eventually returned to Britain, Thompson and Berry were knighted and heavily praised for their defence of their ship against heavy odds, while Lejoille was also commended for his success, assisted by his incorrect account of the battle published in French newspapers.

=== Alexandria ===
With the French naval presence in the Mediterranean reduced to a few scattered vessels, the allies of the Second Coalition were able to exert their dominance in the region. Off Alexandria, the squadron under Captain Hood successfully prevented communications between France and the French army in Egypt. On 22 August, just three days after Nelson sailed north, Alcmene intercepted the 6-gun dispatch vessel Légère off Alexandria harbour and forced the captain to surrender. As his flag was struck, the captain hurled the dispatches into the sea. This action was witnessed by sailors John Taylor and John Harding aboard Alcmene and both men dived into the water, successfully retrieving the messages. For their bravery in diving from a rapidly moving ship into unknown waters, both men were granted annual pensions of £20 (the equivalent of £2,200 as of 2025). Three days after the capture of Légère, Captain Foley of Goliath sent a boat into the sheltered anchorage under Aboukir Castle, where his men boarded and captured the armed ketch Torride, typical of the gun-vessels that had fired on the British advance during the Battle of the Nile. On 2 September, another dispatch vessel reached the Egyptian coast, the 4-gun cutter Anémone carrying General Camin and 60 men from Malta. Swiftsure and Emerald managed to cut off the vessel from Alexandria harbour and drive it ashore near the town of Marabou. Although the cutter swiftly broke up in the surf, most of the men aboard managed to scramble ashore. There, while the British ships lay off shore unable to intervene, Bedouin partisans discovered the survivors and massacred them, dragging the few survivors inland before French cavalry could rescue them. The only survivors were rescued by Lieutenant Francis William Fane, who swam to shore with an empty barrel attached to a rope. Despite coming under fire from the French on the beach, he was able to save five men from the Bedouin attack.

In October the small British squadron at Alexandria was briefly reinforced by a Portuguese squadron of four ships of the line and the 64-gun HMS Lion under Captain Manley Dixon, although the Portuguese sailed for Malta after only a few days. On 19 October the squadron was joined by two Turkish corvettes, two Russian frigates and 16 small Turkish gunboats, arranged by Hood on a visit to Rhodes in Swiftsure the week before. The gunboats were subsequently used to bombard Aboukir Castle and a French encampment at Lake Maadie on 25 October, although results were negligible. After the first day the Turkish crews were replaced with British sailors, but except for a complaint from the French that "unfair" incendiary weapons were used in the attack, nothing was achieved. The incendiary shells subsequently proved to have been taken from the captured Spartiate following the battle on 1 August and were found to be made of a substance that burned even under water. After three days the bombardment was abandoned and no further activity took place on the Egyptian coast during the remainder of the year. The Turkish and Russian vessels were eventually withdrawn in December, while Lion was detached to join the blockade of Malta.

=== Ionian Sea ===
The main Mediterranean fleets of the Ottoman Empire and the Russian Empire were deployed in the Ionian Sea. At the Treaty of Campo Formio, France had been awarded the Ionian Islands and the four fortresses of Butrinto, Parga, Preveza and Vonizza on the Albanian and Greek coasts. In early October, following the declaration of war between France and the Ottomans, the local Ottoman potentate, Ali Pasha of Yanina, attacked the French fortresses on the mainland and forced them, apart from Parga, to surrender.

At the same time, the Ionian Islands were attacked by a joint Russian and Turkish expeditionary force, which included ten Russian ships of the line, numerous smaller Russian vessels and approximately 30 assorted Turkish ships. On board were 8,000 Turkish soldiers, which rapidly invaded and seized the islands of Paxi, Santa Maura, Theaki, Cephalonia, Zante and Cerigo, capturing 1,500 French prisoners by 10 October. Only the large fortified island of Corfu held out, and there the defenders were forced back into the main town. Although the town was besieged, operations were slow and the blockade was only loosely enforced, allowing Généreux to successfully break out and reach Ancona. By the end of the year little had changed, the French garrison remaining besieged in Corfu.

=== Malta and Naples ===
Further westwards, the newly captured French island of Malta was under a much more diligent blockade. The returning convoy from Aboukir Bay under Saumarez reached Malta in September. There he encountered a squadron of four Portuguese ships of the line and the British ship Lion under the command of Tomás Xavier Teles de Castro da Gama, Marquess de Niza, initially sending them on to Alexandria. While anchored off Malta awaiting favourable winds, a delegation of native Maltese citizens was brought on board Saumarez's ship Orion on 25 September. They announced that the Maltese people, infuriated with French disestablishment of the Roman Catholic Church on Malta, had risen up against the French garrison and were forcing them back towards the fortress of Valletta. Saumarez attempted to negotiate the surrender of the island with Vaubois, but was rebuffed. Unable to delay his passage to Gibraltar any longer, Saumarez gave the Maltese 1,200 muskets and promised to send assistance as soon as he was able. By 12 October, the French were besieged in Valletta by 10,000 Maltese irregulars. Vaubois had only 3,000 healthy troops, although the arrival of Villeneuve with the ship of the line Guillaume Tell and two frigates did bolster his defences.

On the same day that the French retreated to Valletta, Nelson despatched the ships Alexander, Culloden, and Colossus from his squadron at Naples to blockade the port, under the command of Captain Alexander Ball. Although the Neapolitans refused to deploy forces to Malta, which was technically their territory, the squadron was joined within a few days by Niza's Portuguese ships and then by Nelson, now Lord Nelson, in Vanguard on 24 October. Four days later, Nelson authorised Ball to negotiate the surrender of the nearby island of Gozo. The French abandoned the island's fortifications and the British captured 24 cannon and 3,200 urgently required sacks of grain, which were distributed among the Maltese populace. With the French garrison trapped in Valletta, no further actions took place off Malta during the year, both sides settling in for a long siege.

While his captains enforced the blockade of Malta and Alexandria during September and October, Nelson was anchored in the Bay of Naples, enjoying the hospitality of King Ferdinand and Queen Maria Carolina of the Kingdom of Naples. Arriving on 22 September, Vanguard was greeted with over 500 small vessels organised by the royal family and led by a barge carrying Sir William and Lady Emma Hamilton. Over the next weeks, Nelson was taken into the court as an honoured guest, and has subsequently been accused of neglecting his naval responsibilities. It was at this time that his mutual attraction to Lady Emma Hamilton developed into a romantic affair. He also began to dabble in Neapolitan politics, successfully combining with Maria Carolina, the francophobe Queen, to encourage Ferdinand to go to war with France. Ferdinand ordered the Neapolitan army under General Mack to drive the French out of Rome. The resulting campaign was a disaster for the Neapolitans; the French counterattacked and forced Ferdinand and his court to flee to Palermo in Sicily. The French established the Parthenopean Republic in Naples to replace the monarchy.

=== Spain and Menorca ===
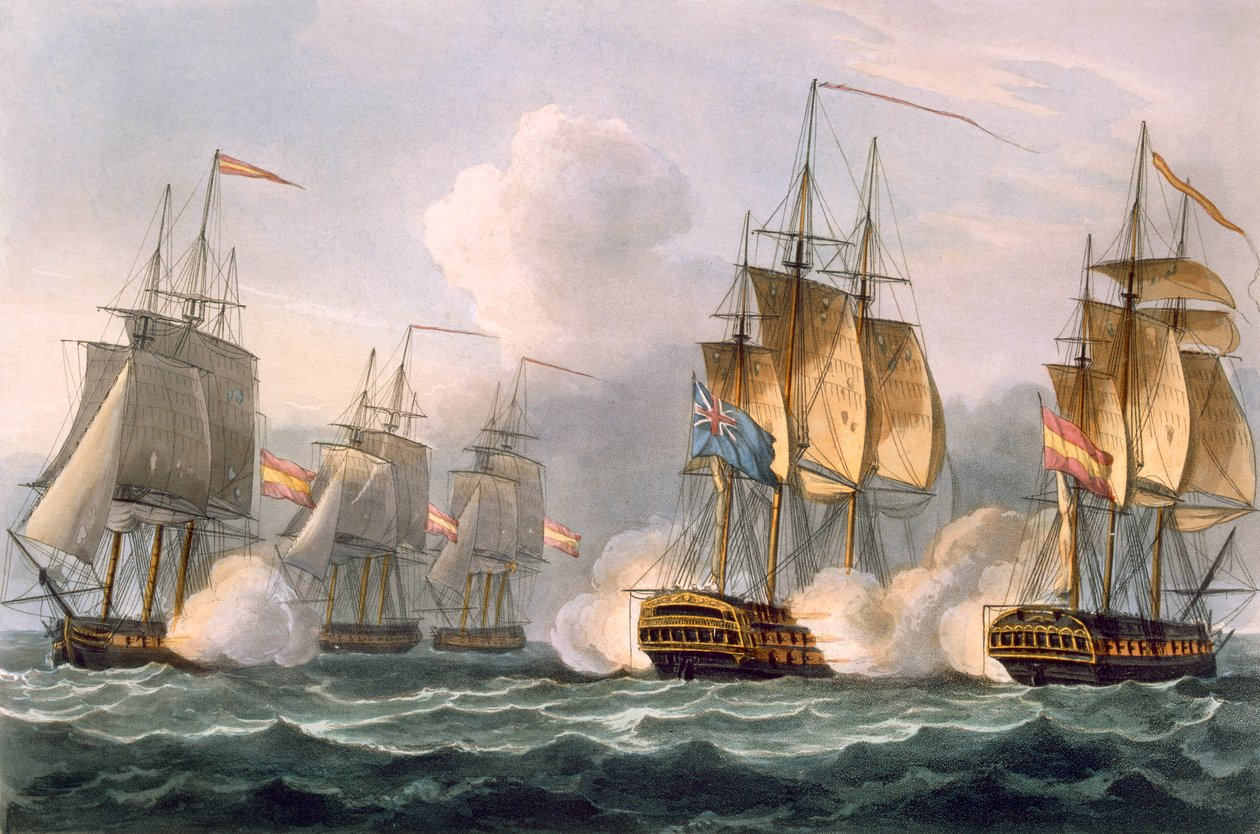
Capture of the Dorothea, 15 July 1798, Thomas Whitcombe, 1816

While Nelson was engaged in the Central and Eastern Mediterranean, the main Mediterranean Fleet under Earl St Vincent had ensured that the Spanish Navy was unable to intervene. On 24 May St Vincent was joined at the Tagus by a reinforcement of eight ships under Rear-Admiral Sir Roger Curtis, and the admiral ordered his ships to establish blockades off the southern Spanish ports, especially Cádiz, where the main Spanish fleet lay at anchor. There regular correspondence passed between St Vincent and Admiral Don Joseph Massaredo, the Spanish commander. The Spanish fleet made no major deployments during the year, except for a single convoy of the ship of the line Monarca, two frigates and several merchant vessels that sailed in April. Although privateers and minor warships fought several small engagements along the Spanish Mediterranean coast, the only significant Spanish deployment of the remainder of the year was by a frigate squadron based at Cartagena, which was intercepted by the British ship of the line Lion. At the ensuing Action of 15 July 1798, the Spanish ships formed a line to meet the attack of Captain Dixon's ship but the damaged frigate Santa Dorotea fell behind the leading three frigates. As the leading ships returned to Cartagena after a desultory long-range exchange of gunfire, Santa Dorotea was defeated and captured.

Once the French Mediterranean Fleet had been destroyed in Aboukir Bay, St Vincent was determined to restore British hegemony in the Mediterranean. To ensure this, his fleet needed a base with a well protected deep water harbour that could not be assaulted by land. The best island harbour in the Western Mediterranean was at Port Mahon on Menorca, where a large modern dockyard included a careening wharf, extensive storehouses and a purpose-built naval hospital. These facilities were all British in manufacture, constructed during periods of occupation by British forces between 1708 – 1756 and 1763 – 1781. St Vincent therefore detached two ships of the line, three frigates and several smaller vessels and transports to the island under Commodore John Thomas Duckworth, carrying a small army under Colonel Charles Stuart. The expeditionary force arrived off Menorca on 7 November and the troops were landed at Addaya Creek. There a Spanish attack was driven off and over the next two days the army continued inland, a detachment under Colonel Henry Paget seizing Port Mahon while the main army received the surrender of town after town, including Fournella, which overlooked the island's principal protected anchorage. On 11 November a Spanish squadron of four frigates attempted to disrupt operations, but a swift counterattack by Duckworth's ships drove them off. By 16 November the town of Ciudadella capitulated and control of the island was ceded to British forces.

== Bibliography ==
- Adkins, Roy & Lesley (2006). The War for All the Oceans. Abacus. ISBN 0-349-11916-3.
- Bradford, Ernle (1999) [1977]. Nelson: The Essential Hero. Wordsworth Military Library. ISBN 1-84022-202-6.
- Chandler, David (1999) [1993]. Dictionary of the Napoleonic Wars. Wordsworth Military Library. ISBN 1-84022-203-4.
- Clowes, William Laird (1997) [1900]. The Royal Navy, A History from the Earliest Times to 1900, Volume IV. Chatham Publishing. ISBN 1-86176-013-2.
- Cole, Juan (2007). Napoleon's Egypt; Invading the Middle East. Palgrave Macmillan. ISBN 978-1-4039-6431-1.
- Come, Donald R. (Winter 1952). "French Threat to British Shores, 1793–1798". Military Affairs. 16 (4): 174–188. doi:10.2307/1982368. JSTOR 1982368.
- Gardiner, Robert, ed. (2001) [1996]. Nelson Against Napoleon. Caxton Editions. ISBN 1-86176-026-4.
- Germani, Ian (January 2000). "Combat and Culture: Imagining the Battle of the Nile". The Northern Mariner. X (1): 53–72. doi:10.25071/2561-5467.610.
- James, William (2002) [1827]. The Naval History of Great Britain, Volume 2, 1797–1799. Conway Maritime Press. ISBN 0-85177-906-9.
- Keegan, John (2003). Intelligence in War: Knowledge of the Enemy from Napoleon to Al-Qaeda. Pimlico. ISBN 0-7126-6650-8.
- Maffeo, Steven E. (2000). Most Secret and Confidential: Intelligence in the Age of Nelson. London: Chatham Publishing. ISBN 1-86176-152-X.
- Moschonas, Nikolaos (1975). "Τα Ιόνια Νησιά κατά την περίοδο 1797–1821" [The Ionian Islands in the period 1797–1821]. In Christopoulos, Georgios A. & Bastias, Ioannis K. (eds.). Ιστορία του Ελληνικού Έθνους [History of the Greek Nation] (in Greek). Vol. ΙΑ: Ο Ελληνισμός υπό ξένη κυριαρχία (περίοδος 1669 - 1821), Τουρκοκρατία - Λατινοκρατία [Hellenism under Foreign Rule (Period 1669 - 1821), Turkocracy – Latinocracy]. Athens: Ekdotiki Athinon. pp. 382–402. ISBN 978-960-213-100-8.
- Mostert, Noel (2007). The Line upon a Wind: The Greatest War Fought at Sea Under Sail 1793 – 1815. Vintage Books. ISBN 978-0-7126-0927-2.
- Padfield, Peter (2000) [1976]. Nelson's War. Wordsworth Military Library. ISBN 1-84022-225-5.
- Rodger, N.A.M. (2004). The Command of the Ocean. Allan Lane. ISBN 0-7139-9411-8.
- Rose, J. Holland (1924). "Napoleon and Sea Power". Cambridge Historical Journal. 1 (2): 138–157. doi:10.1017/S1474691300000925.
- Warner, Oliver (1960). The Battle of the Nile. B. T. Batsford.
- Woodman, Richard (2001). The Sea Warriors. Constable Publishers. ISBN 1-84119-183-3.
