= French frigate Sensible =

French frigate Sensible may refer to the following ships:

- French frigate Sensible (1767)
- French frigate Sensible (1787)

== See also ==
- Sensible (disambiguation)
