= Maurice Gillet =

Maurice Gillet (Montoir, 8 March 1763 – Nantes, 14 April 1833) was a French navy officer.

Born to a family of sailors, Gillet started sailing in 1793 on the Northumberland. On 1 July 1793, he was promoted to lieutenant, and served on the frigates Carmagnole and Cocarde nationale.

Having raised to captain by 1796, Gillet served on the Mucius and Républicain, before taking command of the 80-gun Franklin in March 1798.

On Franklin, Gillet was flag officer to rear admiral Armand Blanquet du Chayla, second-in-command of the French fleet of Toulon during the Mediterranean campaign of 1798. He took part in the Battle of the Nile, where he was gravely wounded at the chest and had to be carried below unconscious, while commander Martinet took over.

Gillet was taken prisoner when Franklin, with only three guns left and half her crew casualties, struck her colours. He was taken to England, and later released.

In September 1803, Gillet resumed his naval career by supervising the 2nd gunboat division of the flotilla in Boulogne. In August, incapacitated by his injuries sustained at Aboukir, Gillet requested to be relieved, while giving command of his ships to commander Regnauld. On 26 August, a naval skirmish opposed 90 French brigs and luggers to the British Immortalité, Harpy, Adder and Constitution, sinking the later.

Gillet was found to have been ashore while his division fought, and was consequently destituted by Decrès. He never managed to resume his naval career.

== Sources and references ==
- Dictionnaire des capitaines de vaisseau de Napoléon, Danielle & Bernard Quintin, SPM, 2003, ISBN 2-901952-42-9
