= Josiah Bruce =

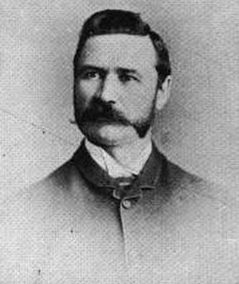
- Born: June 16, 1840; Guelph, Upper Canada
- Died: May 14, 1913 (aged 72); Toronto
- Known for: iconic photographs

Josiah Bruce (June 16, 1840 – May 14, 1913) was a Canadian known for creating notable photographs of historic value in the late nineteenth and early twentieth century.

Bruce's maternal grandfather, John Taylor, was a naval hero who served under Horatio Nelson, who had his picture painted for Britain's National Picture Gallery after he dived in and managed to retrieve dispatches a French officer had tried to dispose of by throwing them overboard. Bruce's parents joined Taylor, in Guelph, Ontario, in 1837. Bruce was born there in 1840. Bruce studied architectureat the Paisley Block School.

In 1861, Bruce worked briefly as an architect in Quebec City but soon started working under established photographer William Notman in Montreal. Bruce worked for Notman for about fifteen years before setting up his photography studio in Toronto.

According to his biographer Joan M. Schwarz, Bruce's 1876 photo of Ned Hanlan was probably the first ever taken of the famous rower.

According to Graeme Mercer Adam's 1891 Toronto, Old and New, "There are few houses of refinement in Toronto, or for that matter, in Ontario, that do not contain one or more photographs executed in Mr. Bruce's excellent studio."

In 1894, Bruce was awarded a contract from Toronto's City Engineer to photograph the city's work on public projects. Bruce replaced photographer F.W. Micklethwaite. Bruce documented city work for five years.
