= John Taylor (Royal Navy) =

Royal Navy seaman

- Born: 1775; Scotland
- Died: 1848 (aged 72–73); Canada
- Occupations: seaman, farmer, settler, poet
- Known for: An act of heroism won Taylor a handsome annuity, and a portrait in the National Portrait Gallery

John Taylor (1775–1848) was a Scottish seaman who served in the Royal Navy, and later helped settle Guelph in Upper Canada (now Ontario).

== Life ==
Taylor was born in Scotland in 1775. His service during the Mediterranean campaign of 1798 earned him a lifetime pension. His ship, HMS Alcmene, had captured an enemy ship, carrying important despatches. When the enemy captain tried to prevent the British from capturing those despatches, Taylor and another seaman dove into the sea after them. Both men were awarded lifetime pensions of 20 pounds a year.

In his account of the incident Horatio Nelson quoted the captain of Taylor's ship:

On the 22nd of August, the Alcmene captured La Legére, French Gun-Boat off Alexandria. 'We could not,' says Captain Hope in his official Letter, 'prevent the despatches for Bonaparte from being thrown overboard, which was perceived, however, by John Taylor and James Harding, of the Alcmene, who, at the risk of their lives (the ship then going between 5 and 6 knots) dashed overboard, and saved the whole of them. Both men were fortunately picked up, by the Boat that was sent after them, and I conceive it my duty to make known the very spirited conduct they showed on this occasion for the good of the service.'

Taylor later emigrated to Canada, where he was one of the original settlers in Guelph. Accounts differ as to when he arrived—either in 1828 or 1834. The region of Guelph which Taylor and others from Scotland settled was known as the "Paisley Block".

== Legacy ==
According to Graeme Mercer Adam's 1891 book Toronto, Old and New... in addition to his lifetime pension, Taylor's heroism earned him a picture in the National Gallery.

Taylor's grandson, Josiah Bruce, was a prominent photographer in 19th-century Canada.

In 2018 Ed Butts, profiling Taylor for the Guelph Mercury, repeated a poem Taylor wrote which became the lyrics to a song popular among Scottish settlers in the Guelph area.
