= Sensible =

Sensible may refer to:

- Captain Sensible (born 1954), English rock guitarist
- French frigate Sensible (1787), a 32-gun Magicienne-class frigate
- Sensible Sentencing Trust, a lobby group
- Sensible Software, a defunct video game company
- Sensible, an album by Zayda y los Culpables

== See also ==
- Sense (disambiguation)
- Sensibility
