= Action of 27 June 1798 =

Action of the Mediterranean campaign of 1798

- Part of the Mediterranean campaign of 1798
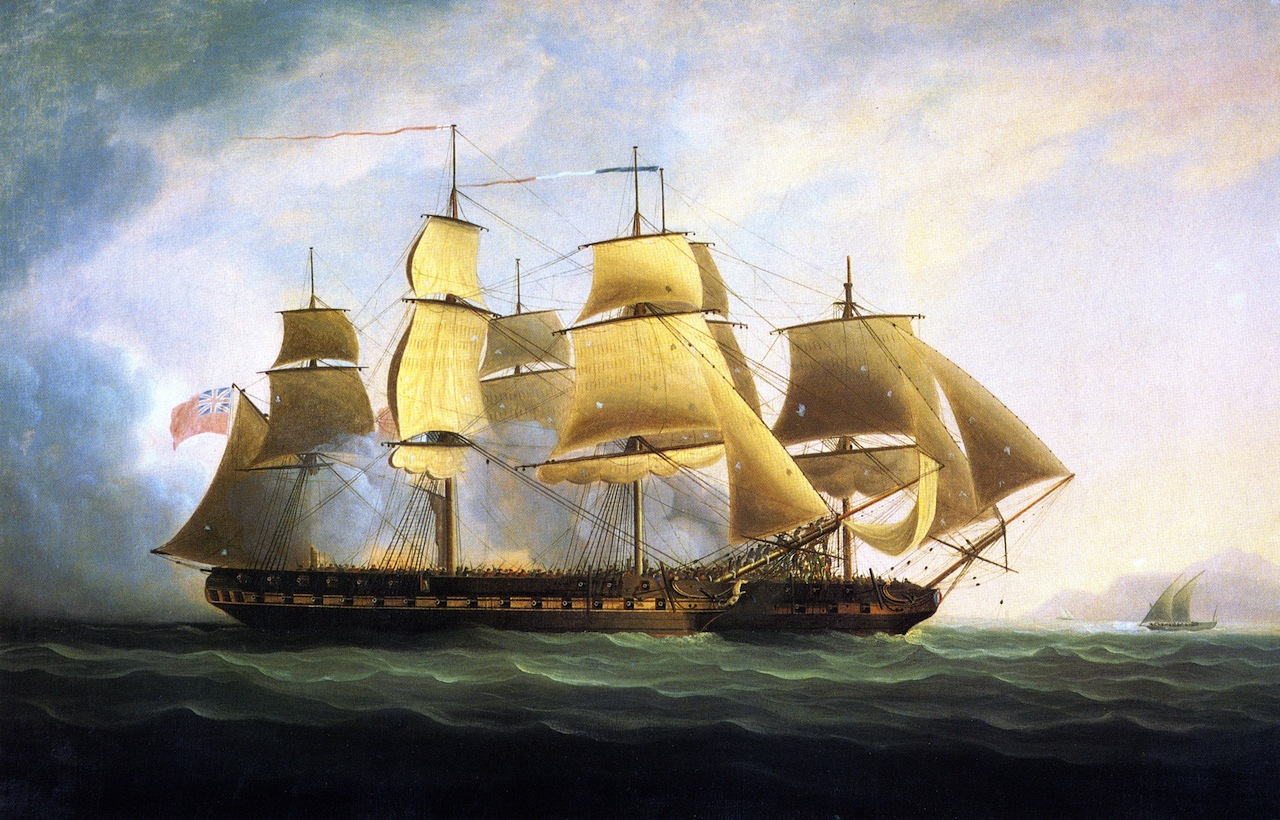
- Painting of the action by James E. Buttersworth
Date	27 June 1798
Location	Strait of Sicily, Mediterranean Sea
Result	British victory

Belligerents
Great Britain	France

Commanders and leaders
Edward Foote	Guillaume-François-Joseph Bourdé (surrendered)

Strength
1 frigate	1 frigate

Casualties and losses
2 killed 16 wounded	25 killed 55 wounded 1 frigate captured

The action of 27 June 1798 was a single-ship action fought between the British and French navies in the Strait of Sicily as part of the Mediterranean campaign of 1798. On 19 May 1798, a French fleet left Toulon to invade Egypt. On 12 June the French fleet captured Malta, after which the 32-gun frigate Sensible, captained by Frigate Captain Guillaume-François-Joseph Bourdé, was detached from the fleet to transport wounded troops and loot back to France. Meanwhile, the 38-gun British frigate HMS Seahorse, under Captain Edward Foote, was detached from the Mediterranean Fleet in the Tagus River with orders to reinforce Sir Horatio Nelson's fleet, which was searching for the French fleet.

Lookouts on Seahorse spotted Sensible at 16:00 on 26 June and Foote immediately gave chase, with the French frigate fleeing southwards. For 12 hours the pursuit continued until Seahorse was able to catch up with Sensible, inflicting heavy casualties on the weaker and overladen French frigate, which eventually struck her colours. Sensible was initially fitted out as a warship, but upon her arrival at England in 1799 the ship was downgraded to a troopship. The action provided the British with the first conclusive evidence of the French intention to invade Egypt, but despite an extensive search for Nelson's fleet, Foote was unable to relay the location of the French to him before the Battle of the Nile on 1 August.

== Background ==
On 19 May 1798, a French fleet departed Toulon for a top secret destination. The force consisted of 22 warships and 120 transports, and was joined by additional ships from Genoa, Corsica and Civitavecchia as it sailed south through the Ligurian Sea. The fleet's target was Egypt, a territory nominally controlled by the Ottoman Empire that Napoleon, the fleet's overall commander, considered an ideal springboard for operations against British India. Passing southwards without interference from the Royal Navy, which had been absent from the Mediterranean for over a year following the outbreak of war between Britain and Spain, Napoleon's fleet passed Sicily on 7 June and two days later was at anchor off the harbour of Valletta, Malta. The island nation of Malta was then ruled by the Knights Hospitaller, a religious order that depended on France for much of its wealth and recruits. Napoleon believed that capturing Malta was essential to controlling the Central Mediterranean, and when Grand Master Ferdinand von Hompesch zu Bolheim refused the French fleet entry to the harbour, Napoleon responded with a large scale invasion. The order put up little resistance, although fighting against native Maltese troops lasted for 24 hours until the central city of Mdina fell. With this defeat the order withdrew to their fortress at Valletta but were persuaded to surrender the following day with promises of pensions and estates in France.

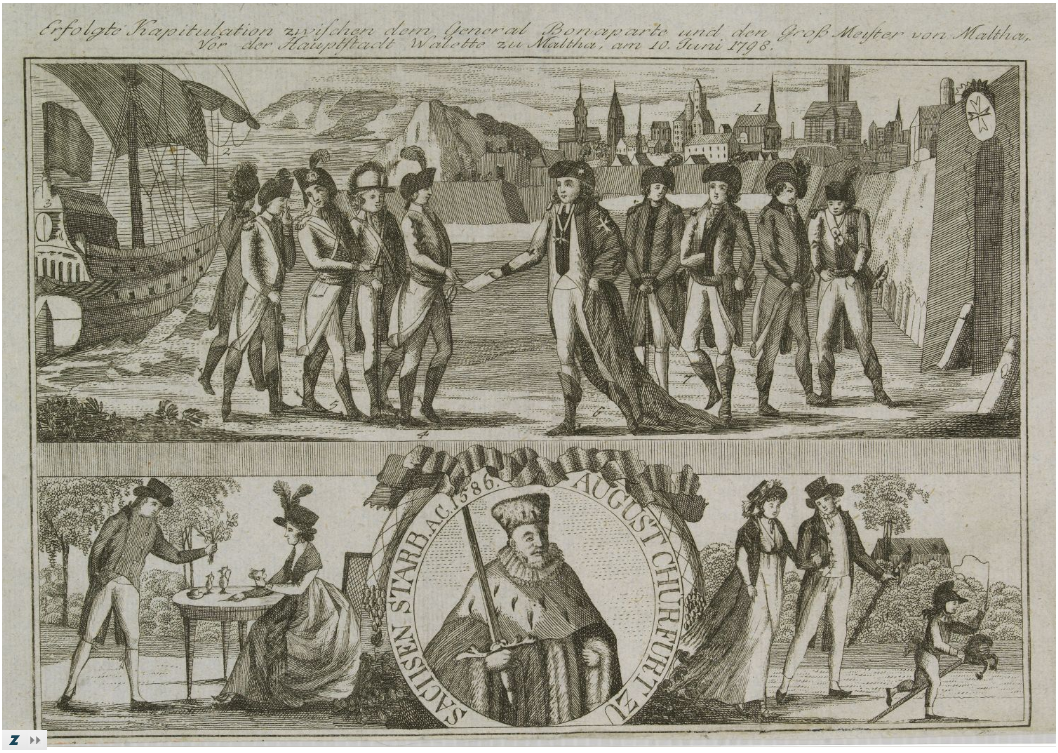
Engraving of the French invasion of Malta

With Malta secure, Napoleon took control over the Maltese army and navy, adding them to his own forces. He garrisoned Valletta and among the items he seized included all properties owned by the Catholic Church in Malta. Much of the seized items were auctioned off, while others were ordered to be sent back to France along with dispatches carried by the wounded General Louis Baraguey d'Hilliers and other soldiers injured during the invasion. On 19 June Napoleon divided his forces, leaving 4,000 men to garrison the island while the remainder of the fleet set sail for Egypt. One ship was ordered to return to France with the wounded, despatches and some of the loot. For this purpose the 36-gun frigate Sensible under Frigate Captain Guillaume-François-Joseph Bourdé was selected, although much of her existing crew was removed and replaced with freed Maltese galley slaves.

Although Napoleon had not expected British interference in his operations against Egypt, the Royal Navy had responded to the reports of French mobilisation on the south coast by dispatching a small squadron to the Ligurian Sea under Rear-Admiral of the Blue Sir Horatio Nelson. Arriving on 21 May, Nelson's squadron was struck by a severe storm and was forced to make hasty repairs off Sardinia. The storm had also dispersed the squadron's frigates, leaving Nelson with only three ships of the line. Although he was reinforced by another 11 ships of the line on 7 June, he still lacked any scouts and was thus severely hampered in his ability to search for information on French operations. The detached frigates had been scattered across the Western Mediterranean, and were unable to locate either the British or the French fleets. Reinforcements sent by Admiral of the Blue Earl St Vincent at the Tagus River suffered from the same problem, the frigates spreading out widely in their search but failing to discover either of the main British or French forces, which were rapidly sailing southeastwards towards Alexandria.

== Battle ==
One of the British reinforcements cruising in the Central Mediterranean in June was the frigate HMS Seahorse, commanded by Captain Edward Foote. Seahorse was officially rated as a 38-gun ship, but in reality carried 46 guns, including 14 32-pounder carronades, very heavy short-range cannon. Foote had been despatched by Earl St. Vincent to join Nelson's squadron in his hunt for the French and carried on board a number of reinforcements for HMS Culloden, one of Nelson's ships commanded by Captain Thomas Troubridge. On 26 June, Seahorse was passing along the southern Sicilian coast in search of information about the whereabouts of the British fleet when at 16:00 his lookout sighted a ship. Advancing rapidly, Foote recognised the stranger as a French frigate and prepared for battle. The frigate was Sensible, which was on a northeasterly course from Malta to Toulon when sighted. Bourdé, knowing that his ship was overladen, undermanned and carried only 36 guns, some of which were only 6-pounders, turned away and sailed south, hoping to outrun his opponent during the night.

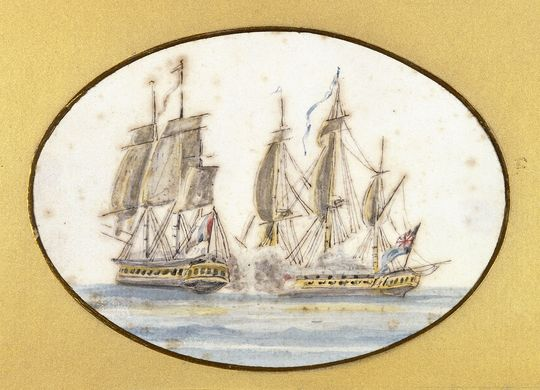
Painting of Sensible and Seahorse in close combat

For 12 hours Sensible fled southwards, but Foote's pursuit was relentless and Bourdé found the distance between his frigate and Seahorse gradually disappearing. At 04:00 on 27 July, with the island of Pantelleria 36 miles (58 km) to the northwest, Foote was able to pull Seahorse alongside his opponent and open a heavy fire from close range. At the first shots, many of the galley slaves deserted their positions and fled below decks, leaving the French ship dangerously exposed. Within eight minutes Sensible was battered into submission, Bourdé's desperate attempt to board Seahorse easily avoided by Foote. The French frigate received 36 cannon shot in the hull and significant damage to the masts. Casualty estimates vary, but between 18 and 25 men were killed and 35 to 55 were wounded from a total of approximately 300. Seahorse by contrast suffered only light damage, losing two men dead and 16, including First Lieutenant Wilmot, wounded.

Foote removed much of the treasure and prisoners from Sensible before despatching the vessel under a prize crew to Earl St. Vincent in the Tagus. Among the goods seized from the frigate were copies of the French naval code books, as well as information about the destination of Bonaparte's invasion fleet. Sailing immediately for Alexandria, Foote was joined soon afterwards by HMS Terpsichore under Captain William Hall Gage, who was also searching for Nelson. Together they reached Alexandria on 21 July, discovering that the French were already in the harbour although Nelson was nowhere to be seen. Observing the French dispositions, Foote and Gage disguised their ships as a French frigate and its prize, Gage hoisting French colours over British to indicate that his ship had been captured and Foote displaying the secret French recognition codes. This appears to have convinced the French that the strangers were not enemy ships, and no move was made against them, Foote and Gage free to observe the French anchorage in Aboukir Bay before striking out along the African coast in search of Nelson. The British admiral was at this time resupplying his ships at Syracuse on Sicily, and when he sailed on 25 July he passed eastwards to Morea where he learned of the French invasion of Egypt from the Turkish governor of Coron. Striking directly southwards, Nelson arrived at Aboukir Bay on 1 August without ever encountering Foote or learning his intelligence. Seahorse eventually returned to Alexandria on 17 August to discover that Nelson had fought and won the Battle of the Nile nearly three weeks earlier.

== Aftermath ==
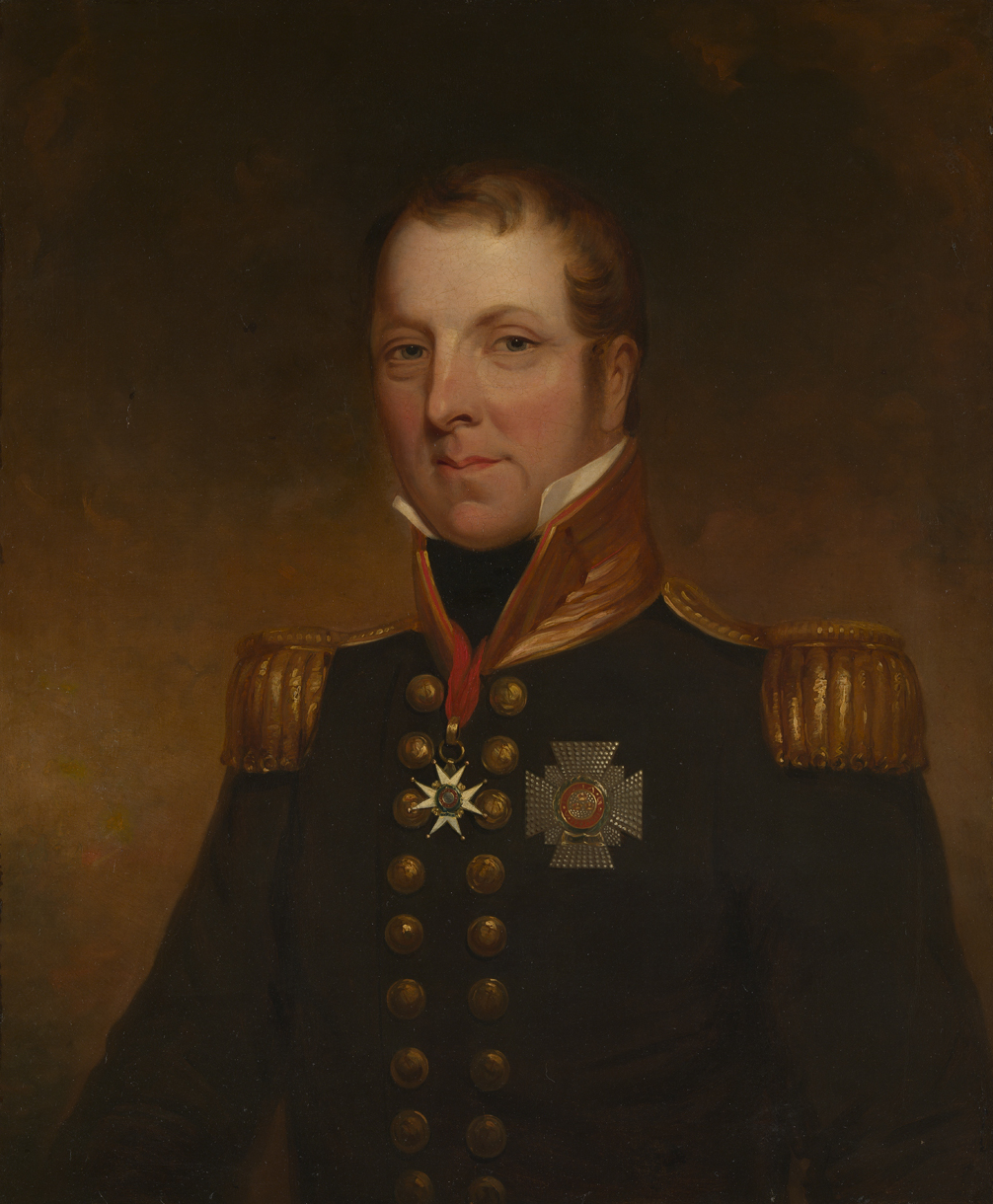
Portrait of Foote later in his career

Earl St Vincent was suffering from an extreme shortage of frigates, and on the arrival of Sensible at the Tagus immediately ordered the frigate to be commissioned as HMS Sensible, stripping six men from each of his ships to man her and turning the frigate into an active warship in just 12 hours. For a year Sensible remained with St. Vincent, until she was sent back to Britain in November 1799. On arrival the ship was downgraded from frontline service, but did spend several years commissioned as a military transport until wrecked off Ceylon on 3 March 1802. Among the treasures removed from the ship was a decorated brass cannon captured from the Ottomans in the seventeenth century and presented to the Knights of St. John of Jerusalem by King Louis XIV of France, as well as a model of a galley made from gilt silver. These were sold, along with the other cargo and ships fittings at Sheerness in November 1799, the prize money shares subsequently awarded to the crew of Seahorse.

General d'Hilliers and the other prisoners were taken to Britain, but the officers were soon paroled. On their return to France, d'Hilliers and Bourdé were court martialled and initially condemned by the Minister of Marine Étienne Eustache Bruix. Bruix believed that the ship had been too easily surrendered and publicly released a strongly worded letter criticising their "talents and courage". This level of criticism, which British naval historian William James considers excessive, was eventually toned down and after a spirited defence by d'Hilliers both officers were honourably acquitted. Foote was praised for his success, and Lieutenant Wilmot, who successfully carried the frigate to the Tagus, was promoted. Foote later commanded Seahorse off Naples, and became embroiled in the controversy that surrounded the execution of the leaders of the Parthenopean Republic in 1799.

== Bibliography ==
- Adkins, Roy & Lesley (2006). The War for All the Oceans. Abacus. ISBN 0-349-11916-3.
- Clowes, William Laird (1997) [1900]. The Royal Navy, A History from the Earliest Times to 1900, Volume IV. Chatham Publishing. ISBN 1-86176-013-2.
- Cole, Juan (2007). Napoleon's Egypt; Invading the Middle East. Palgrave Macmillan. ISBN 978-1-4039-6431-1.
- Gardiner, Robert, ed. (2001) [1996]. Nelson Against Napoleon. Caxton Editions. ISBN 1-86176-026-4.
- James, William (2002) [1827]. The Naval History of Great Britain, Volume 2, 1797–1799. Conway Maritime Press. ISBN 0-85177-906-9.
- Keegan, John (2003). Intelligence in War: Knowledge of the Enemy from Napoleon to Al-Qaeda. Pimlico. ISBN 0-7126-6650-8.
