= French ship Orient =

A number of ships of the French Navy have borne the name Orient. Among them:

- The 80-gun ship of the line Orient (1756)
- The 118-gun ship of the line Orient (1791) (launched 1791 at Toulon) originally named Dauphin Royal, renamed Sans Culotte in September 1792 and then Orient in May 1795 - flagship of the French fleet at the Battle of the Nile.
