= HMS Canopus (1798) =

Third-rate ship of the line of the Royal Navy

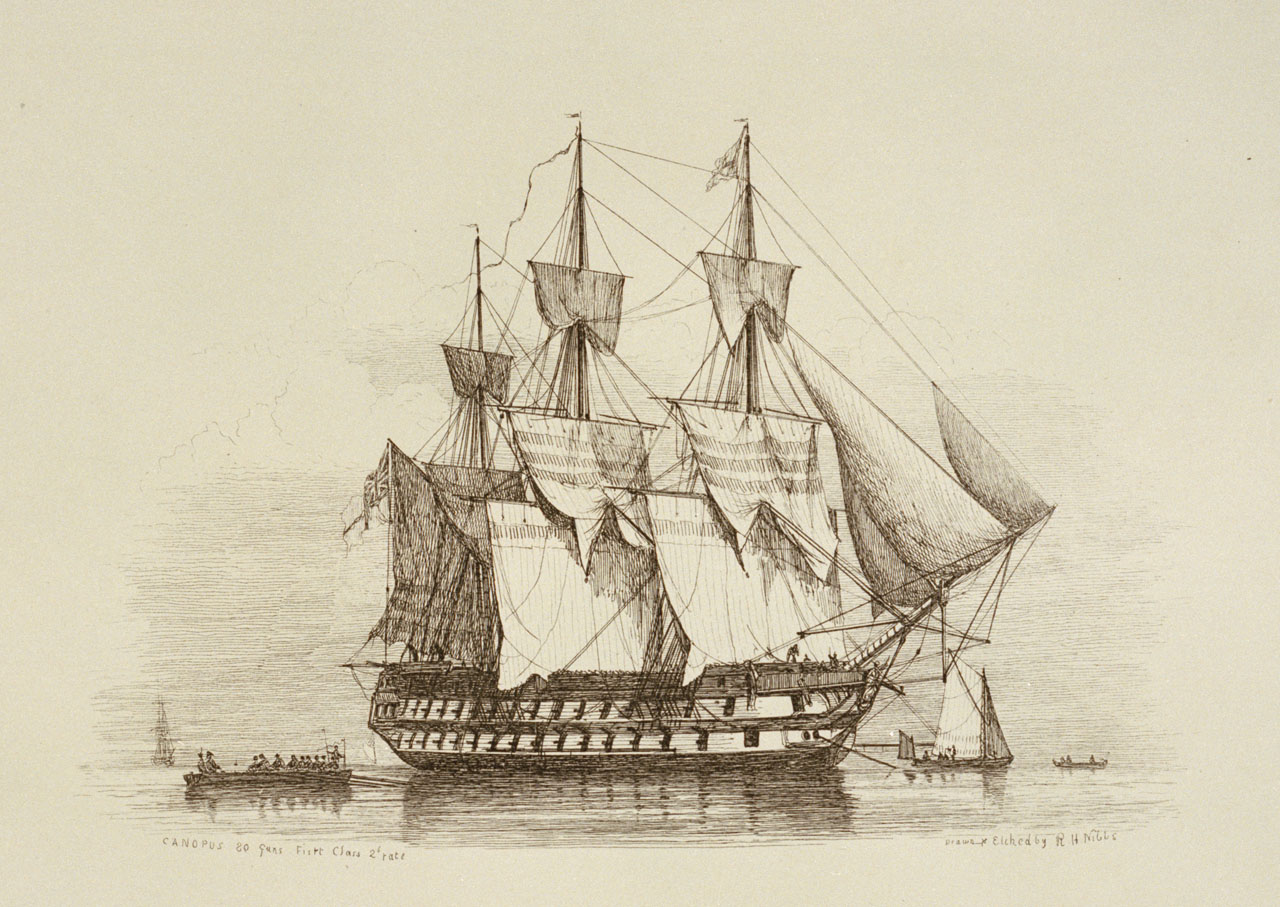
- c. 1849 illustration of Canopus

History

France
- Name: Franklin
- Namesake: Benjamin Franklin
- Builder: Toulon
- Laid down: November 1794
- Launched: 25 June 1797
- Completed: By March 1798
- Captured: 2 August 1798, by the Royal Navy

Great Britain
- Name: HMS Canopus
- Namesake: The star Alpha Carinae and Canopus, Egypt near Aboukir Bay, site of the Battle of the Nile
- Acquired: 2 August 1798
- Fate: Sold for breaking up in October 1887

General characteristics
- Class & type: 84-gun third rate ship of the line
- Displacement: 3,868 tonneaux
- Tons burthen: 2,034 port tonneaux; 2,258 77/94 bm
- Length: 193 ft 10 in (59.1 m) (overall); 159 ft 7 in (48.6 m) (keel)
- Beam: 51 ft 6.75 in (15.7 m)
- Depth of hold: 23 ft 4.5 in (7.12 m)
- Propulsion: Sails
- Sail plan: Full-rigged ship
- Complement: 700
- Armament: French service: Lower deck: 30 36-pounder long guns; Upper deck: 32 24-pounder long guns; Quarter deck: 18 12-pounder long guns; Forecastle: 4 obusiers de vaisseau; British service: Lower deck: 32 × 32-pdrs; Upper deck: 32 × 18-pdrs; Quarter deck: 2 × 18-pdrs + 12 × 32-pdr carronades; Forecastle: 2 × 9-pdrs + 4 × 32-pdr carronades

HMS Canopus was an 84-gun third-rate ship of the line of the Royal Navy. She had previously served with the French Navy as the Tonnant-class Franklin, but was captured after less than a year in service by a British fleet under Rear-admiral Horatio Nelson at the Battle of the Nile in 1798. Having served the French for less than six months from her completion in March 1798 to her capture in August 1798, she eventually served the British for 89 years.

Her career began as the flagship of Counter-admiral Armand Blanquet du Chayla, and she distinguished herself at the Nile with her fierce resistance before being forced to surrender with over half her crew dead or wounded, and most of her guns disabled. Taken into British service she was refitted and served as the flagship of several admirals. Commanded by Francis Austen Canopus was Rear-Admiral Thomas Louis's flagship in the Mediterranean under Nelson, and narrowly missed the Battle of Trafalgar. She saw action with John Thomas Duckworth's fleet at the Battle of San Domingo, and remained with him during the Dardanelles operation, and the operations in support of the Alexandria expedition of 1807.

Canopus remained active against the French in the Mediterranean for the rest of the Napoleonic Wars, helping to drive ashore two large French ships of the line in a notable incident in 1809. Canopus remained in service after the end of the wars, serving as a flagship into the mid-nineteenth century, but as sail gave way to steam, she was relegated to support duties in Devonport, becoming a receiving ship, tender and a mooring hulk. She was eventually sold for breaking up in 1887, after nearly ninety years in British service.

== Construction and French career ==
Franklin was built to a design by Jacques-Noël Sané at the Toulon shipyard between November 1794 and March 1798, having been launched on 25 June 1797. She was named after the American scientist and politician Benjamin Franklin. Commanded by Captain Maurice Gillet and flying the flag of Rear-Admiral Armand Blanquet du Chayla, Franklin was one of the ships that accompanied Vice Admiral François-Paul Brueys's fleet, carrying Napoleon Bonaparte and the French troops to invade Egypt. Franklin was anchored with Brueys's fleet in Aboukir Bay on 1 August, when they were discovered in the evening by a British fleet under Rear-Admiral Horatio Nelson. Nelson ordered his fleet to attack immediately, with the British forces moving on the French van, doubling their line. Brueys was taken by surprise, having expected the British to attack his rear and centre, where he had consequently placed his heaviest ships, including the Franklin. Franklin did not therefore enter the engagement until later that evening, as the French van surrendered and the British ships moved down the line to engage the remaining ships.

=== Franklin's fight ===
Franklin, positioned just ahead of Brueys's flagship, the 120-gun Orient, and astern of the 74-gun Peuple Souverain, came under fire from HMS Orion, HMS Majestic and HMS Defence. The British ships and the French centre exchanged a heavy fire, with the British being joined by the newly arrived HMS Swiftsure, HMS Alexander and HMS Leander. As Du Chayla later recalled 'The action in this part then became extremely warm.' The two sides were intensely engaged for the next hour, during which the Peuple Souverain was forced out of the line, and the Orient caught fire. As the fire on Orient raged out of control, the nearby French and British ships scrambled to escape the anticipated explosion. Orient's magazine blew up at 9:37 p.m., obliterating her and sending burning debris raining down on the nearby ships. Large amounts fell upon the Franklin, starting fires which caused the arms locker to explode and set fire to the poop and quarterdeck.

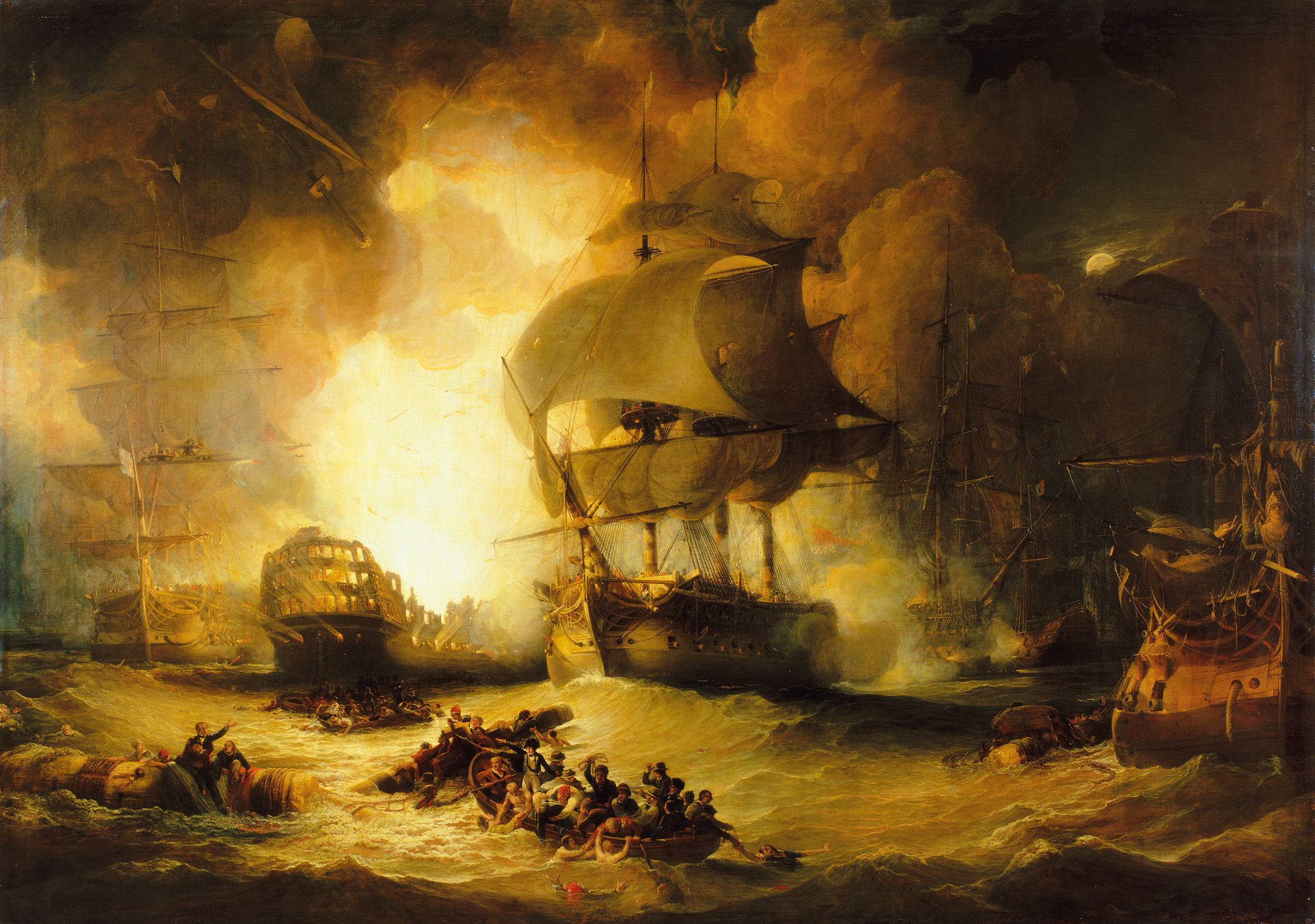
Orient explodes at the Battle of the Nile. Franklin is the ship third from right of the picture, and was almost set on fire herself by falling debris.

For a while it seemed that Franklin would also be burnt, but her crew were able to put out the fires. With Brueys killed aboard Orient, Du Chayla now became commander. Both he and Captain Gillet had been seriously wounded and taken below, but he continued to order the attack. The brief quiet that had resulted from the explosion of the Orient was broken by Franklin's guns, and the battle resumed. She fought for another hour, but by then she had lost her main and mizzenmasts, nearly all of her cannons had been knocked out, and over half her crew were dead or wounded. She finally struck her colours.

== British service ==
=== Mediterranean and San Domingo ===
The Franklin was one of nine ships captured by the British at the Nile, and she was taken into service with the Royal Navy, being registered under the name HMS Canopus on 9 December 1798. She was sent back to Britain under the command of Captain Bartholomew James, and arrived at Plymouth on 17 July 1799. She briefly became the flagship of Admiral Philip Affleck for service off Lisbon, but was paid off into ordinary in August that year. She began a refit at Plymouth in August 1801, but the work was suspended incomplete in November that year, and was only completed in January 1803. She recommissioned in April that year under the command of Captain John Conn, and became the flagship of Rear-Admiral George Campbell.

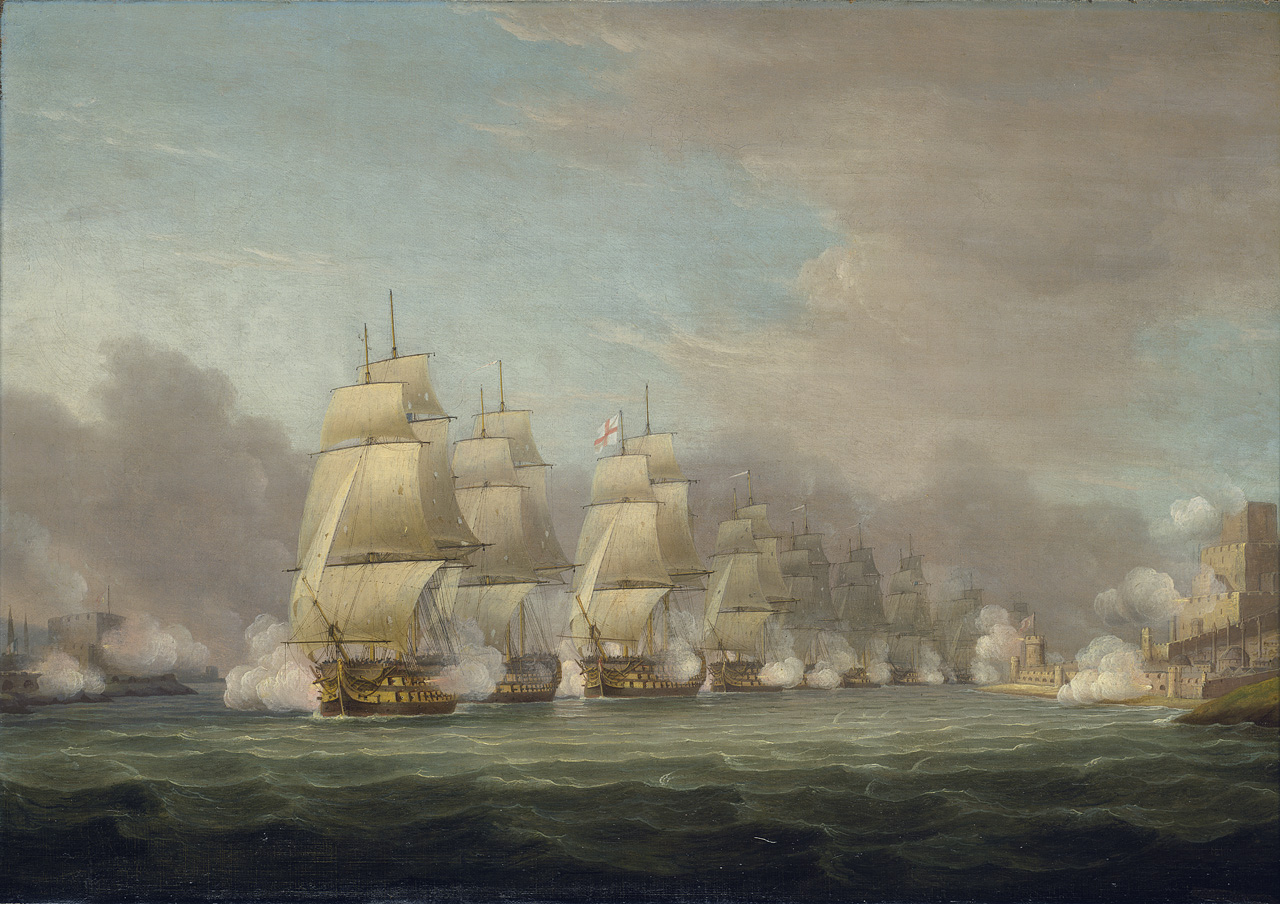
Thomas Whitcombe's depiction of Duckworth's squadron forcing the Dardanelles

Canopus was sent in August 1803 to join the Mediterranean Fleet, near Toulon under Nelson. Conn was succeeded in February 1805 by Captain Francis Austen, and Canopus became the flagship of Rear-Admiral Thomas Louis. Canopus narrowly missed being present at the Battle of Trafalgar, having been sent to Gibraltar with Louis's squadron to resupply. She returned to Britain in mid-1806, where she was taken in hand at Plymouth for repairs, which were completed in August at a cost of £31,804. In January 1806 she joined Vice-Admiral Sir John Thomas Duckworth's squadron in the pursuit of Corentin Urbain Leissègues, and took part in the Battle of San Domingo on 6 February, engaging the 74-gun Diomède among other ships. Canopus sustained casualties of eight dead and 22 wounded. Thomas Shortland became captain of Canopus in July 1806, and sailed to the Mediterranean with Duckworth's squadron, still flying Louis's flag. She took part in the attempt to force the Dardanelles on 19 January, and in subsequent operations in support of the Alexandria expedition, during which nine Turkish vessels were captured or destroyed.

Shortland was succeeded by Captain Charles Inglis in 1808, and became the flagship of Rear-Admiral George Martin. Canopus was attached to the Mediterranean Fleet under Admiral Cuthbert Collingwood and in October 1809 was part of the fleet that gave chase to a French convoy and their escorts under Rear-Admiral François Baudin in the Gulf of Lyons. In the ensuing Battle of Maguelone, the French were chased into the mouth of the Rhone, where the 80-gun Robuste and the 74-gun Lion were driven aground, and after attempts to salvage them had failed, the French were forced to burn them. Canopus became the flagship of Rear-Admiral Charles Boyles between 1811 and 1812, after which she was paid off into ordinary again.

=== Postwar ===
A large repair was carried out at Plymouth Dock (i.e. Devonport) for the sum of £78,909 between March 1814 and March 1816, but with the end of the Napoleonic Wars she was laid up for a number of years. Canopus was fitted for sea at Devonport in May 1834, and underwent further repairs between December 1839 and May 1842. She was prepared for sea again in early 1845, spending time under the command of Fairfax Moresby, before being laid up at Devonport in 1848. She was fitted out there as a receiving ship between June and October 1862, and served as a tender to HMS Indus, the Devonport guardship. Canopus became a mooring hulk in 1869, with her masts being removed in April 1878. She was finally sold after 89 years service with the Royal Navy in October 1887 to J. Pethick, and was broken up.
