= Graeme Mercer Adam =

Canadian author, editor, and publisher

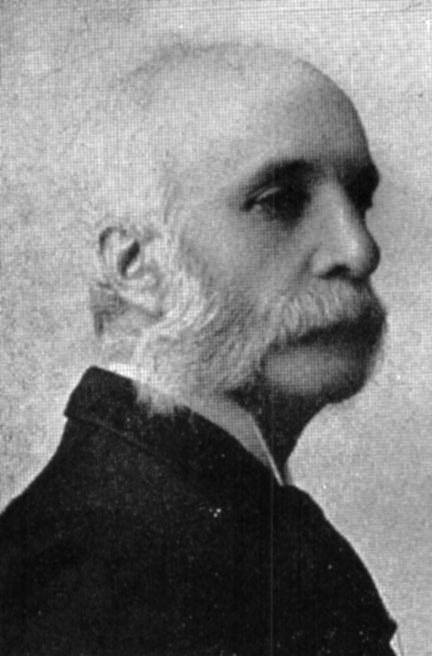
- Born: May 25, 1839; Loanhead, Scotland
- Died: October 30, 1912 (aged 73); New York City, New York
- Resting place: St. James Cemetery, Toronto
- Occupations: Publisher, editor, and author

Graeme Mercer Adam (May 25, 1839 – October 30, 1912) was a Canadian author, editor, and publisher.

Adam was born in Scotland where he developed a deep interest in publishing. He moved to Toronto to run a bookstore. He shortly teamed with a partner to form Rollo & Adam, which ventured into publishing. Their first significant publication was entitled British American Magazine. It was edited by Henry Youle Hind, a geologist and writer about the Canadian northwest. The publication, although short-lived, was the first of a long series of important Canadian periodicals published by Adam. However, "his connection with the Commercial Union agitation injured his popularity in later years".

In 1891 Adam published a book "to Mark the Hundredth Anniversary of the Passing of the Constitutional Act of 1791, which Set Apart the Province of Upper Canada and Gave Birth to York", entitled "Toronto, Old and New..."

== Bibliography ==
- Appleton's Cyclopedia of American Biography, edited by James Grant Wilson, John Fiske and Stanley L. Klos. Six volumes, New York: D. Appleton and Company, 1887-1889
- "Graeme Mercer Adam". Dictionary of Canadian Biography (online ed.). University of Toronto Press. 1979–2016.
