= Armand Blanquet du Chayla =

French naval officer

Count Armand Blanquet du Chayla Knight of the Empire
- Born: 9 May 1759; Marvejols
- Died: 29 April 1826 (aged 67) Versailles
- Allegiance: France
- Branch: Navy
- Rank: Vice Admiral
- Conflicts: American Revolutionary War; Battle of the Chesapeake; Battle of St. Kitts; French Revolutionary Wars; Battle of the Nile

Count Armand Simon Marie Blanquet du Chayla (French pronunciation: [aʁmɑ̃ simɔ̃ maʁi blɑ̃kɛ dy ʃɛla]; 9 May 1759 – 29 April 1826) was an officer in the French Navy, most famous as second in command of the French fleet during its defeat at the Battle of the Nile.

== Early actions ==
Du Chayla was born in Marvejols in the Lozère department in southeast France. As a young naval officer, he distinguished himself during the American Revolutionary War, serving under Admiral d'Estaing. He was captured in 1778, and released two years later. He served under Admiral de Grasse aboard the Languedoc and took part in the Battle of Martinique.

Du Chayla also fought at the Battle of the Chesapeake and at the Battle of St. Kitts, and was wounded at the Battle of the Saintes.

After the war, Du Chayla was promoted to Lieutenant de vaisseau, and later to capitaine de vaisseau, obtaining command of the Tonnant. During the French Revolutionary Wars, he took part in the campaigns on the Italian coasts. In 1793, he was relieved from command because of his nobility, but was soon reinstated. He served as aide to the Minister of the Navy from 1795 to 1797, before being promoted to division commander in 1796, and to contre-amiral soon later.

== Battle of the Nile, and aftermath ==
In 1798, as a rear admiral, Chayla hoisted his flag aboard the Franklin as second in command of the fleet under Admiral François-Paul Brueys d'Aigalliers during the campaign in Egypt. Chayla fought gallantly during the battle and tried in vain to persuade Brueys to order the fleet to set sail. He was severely wounded in the French defeat, and he and the Franklin were both captured by the Royal Navy.

After his return to France, Chayla was a fierce critic of the tactics of Villeneuve, Decrès and Ganteaume, and resigned in 1803. He was later rehabilitated by Napoléon.

He was made a Count and honorary vice-admiral by Louis XVIII. Chayla died in Versailles on 29 April 1826.
