= French frigate Sensible (1787) =

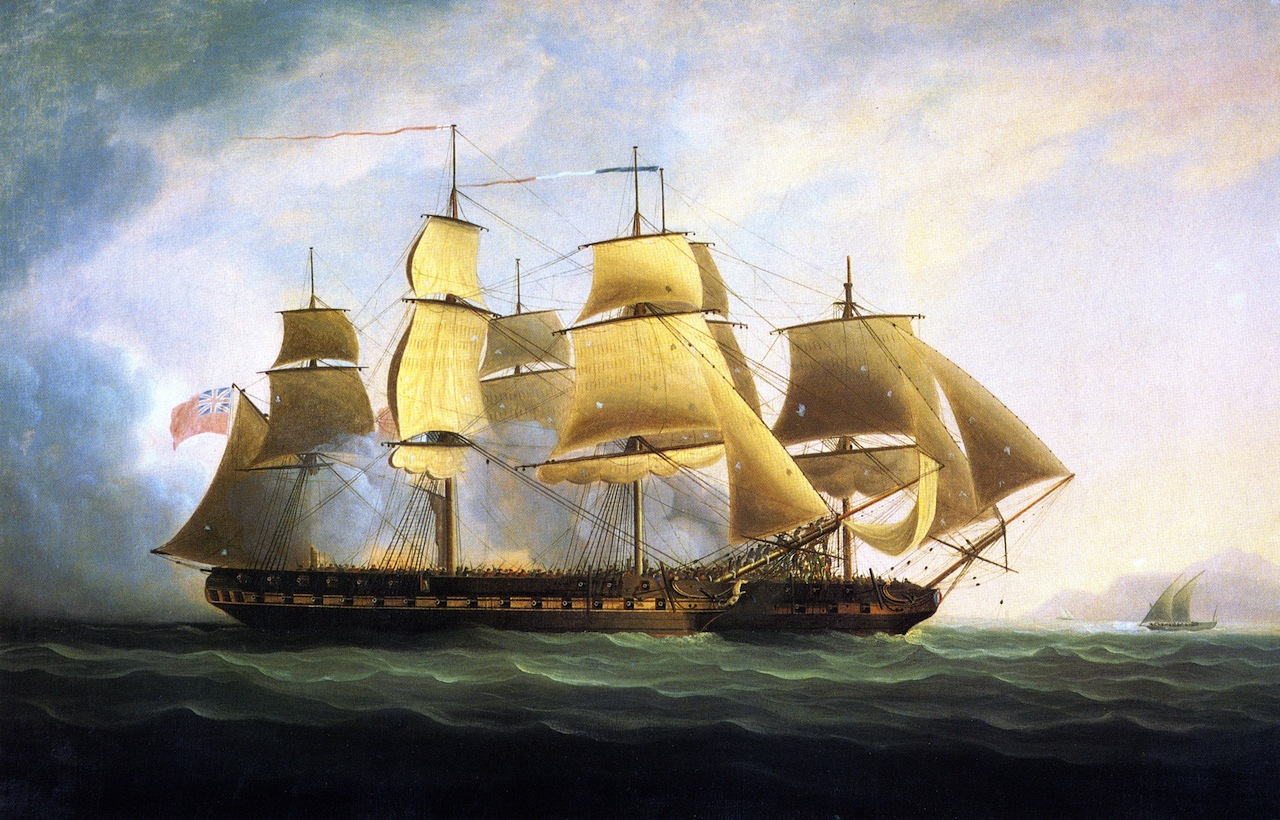
- Sensible (right) at the action of 27 June 1798

History

France
- Name: Sensible
- Namesake: French: "sensitive"
- Ordered: 23 January 1786
- Builder: Toulon
- Laid down: February 1786
- Launched: 9 August 1787
- In service: March 1788
- Captured: 28 June 1798

Great Britain
- Name: Sensible
- Acquired: 28 June 1798 by capture
- Honours and awards: Naval General Service Medal with clasp "Egypt"
- Fate: Wrecked on 2 March 1802

General characteristics
- Class & type: Magicienne-class frigate
- Displacement: 1,100 tonneaux
- Tons burthen: 600 port tonneaux; 94567/94 (bm)
- Length: 44.2 m (145 ft 0 in)
- Beam: 11.2 m (36 ft 9 in)
- Draught: 5.2 m (17 ft 1 in)
- Sail plan: Full-rigged ship
- Armament: French service:26 × 12-pounder long guns + 6 × 6-pounder long guns; British service: No establishment of guns

Sensible was a 32-gun Magicienne-class frigate of the French Navy. The Royal Navy captured her at the action of 27 June 1798 off French-occupied Malta and took into service as HMS Sensible. She was lost in a grounding off Ceylon in 1802.

== French Navy service ==
From November 1789, she served at Martinique under captaine de vaisseau Durand de Braye (or Durand d'Ubraye). In September 1790, she ferried Joséphine de Beauharnais and her daughter Hortense from Martinique to Toulon.

In 1792, she took part in operations against Sardinia. In 1793, she was equipped as a bomb ship.

On 9 December 1795, Sensible was part of Gantaume's squadron. Sensible, along with the corvettes Sardine and Rossignol, captured the 28-gun Nemesis in the neutral port of Smyrna. The French warships entered the harbour in disregard of its neutrality and forced Nemesis to surrender. Murray Maxwell (then a midshipman) was taken prisoner on this occasion.

Under lieutenant de vaisseau (later capitaine de frégate) Escoffier, in March–April 1795 Sensible crossed the Aegean Sea, stopping at Tunis and Valletta on her way to Toulon. The next year she came under the command of Frigate Captain Guillaume-François-Joseph Bourdé. He sailed Sensible from Toulon to Trieste via Corfu. She then cruised the Adriatic before returning to Corfu.

Sensible was subsequently armed en flûte and used as a transport in the Mediterranean. In the action of 27 June 1798, the 38-gun HMS Seahorse captured her. Sensible lost 25 men killed and 55 wounded. Seahorse had two men killed and 16 men wounded; the British report is that Sensible lost 18 men killed and 35 wounded, including Bourdé. Captain Edward James Foote of Seahorse further reported that Sensible had recently received copper sheathing and fastening, and a thorough repair at Toulon two months previously. At the time of her capture Sensible was carrying General of Division Baraguey D'Hilliers, with his entourage. They were going to Toulon with a report on the capture of Malta.

The British took her into service as HMS Sensible. The French Navy suspended Bourdé on 31 July on suspicion of not having resisted adequately, and court-martialed him on 20 May 1799 for the loss of his ship. He was acquitted, and reinstated on 21 August.

== Royal Navy service ==
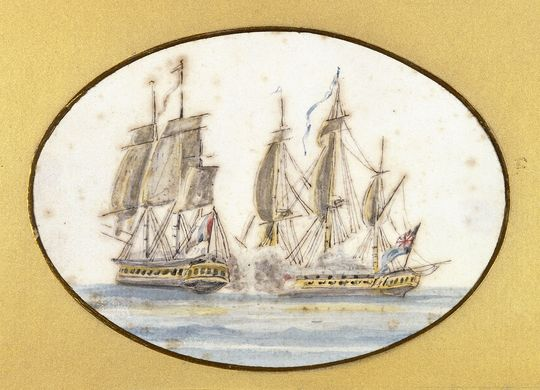
Sensible at the action of 27 June 1798

Sensible was placed under Commander John Baker Hay, who received his promotion to post captain in September. She was named and registered on 13 October. She arrived at Portsmouth on 25 November. There she was fitted as a troopship between June and August 1799. She was commissioned in July under Captain Robert Sauce. Sensible shared with Sheerness and Resource in the proceeds of the recapture, on 11 July 1800, of the Piersons.

On 14 May 1801, Sensible landed troops in Abu Qir Bay. Because Sensible served in the navy's Egyptian campaign (8 March to 2 September 1801), her officers and crew qualified for the clasp "Egypt" to the Naval General Service Medal that the Admiralty issued in 1847 to all surviving claimants.

== Loss ==
On 2 March 1802, as she sailed off Ceylon, she grounded, having been unable to turn quickly enough once breakers were sighted. She had to be abandoned as a wreck after 16 hours of efforts to lighten her. She had run into a shoal off Mullaitivu due to negligent navigation. (Earlier Victorious had warned Sauce that his reckoning was off by 40 miles.) The subsequent court martial severely reprimanded Sauce and moved his name to the bottom of the list of commanders. The court martial also dismissed the service the master, James O'Conner.
