= Nelson's band of brothers =

Phrase used by Horatio Nelson for his captains

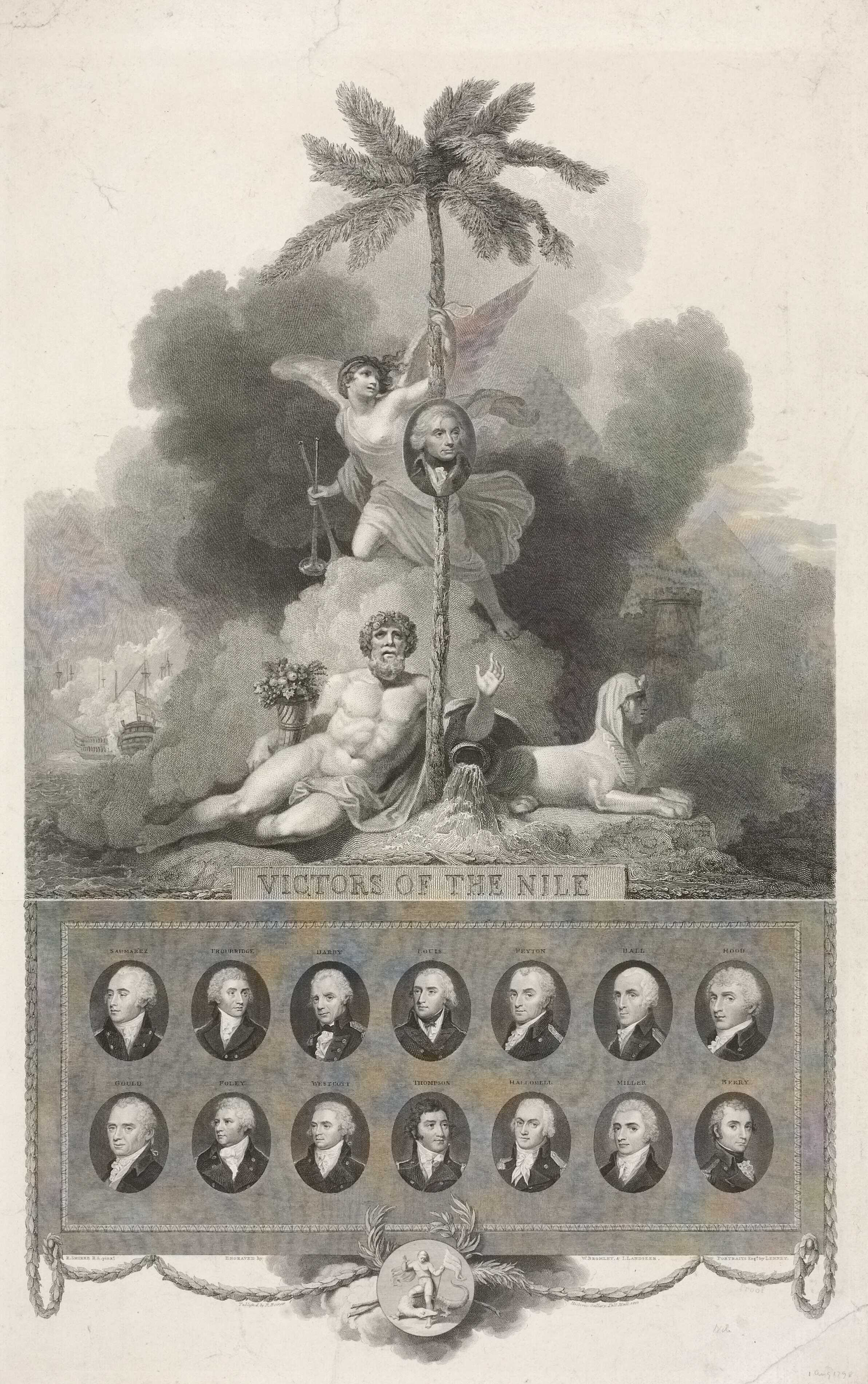
Victors of the Nile - Nelson and the 14 captains at the Nile are depicted in this 1803 engraving, Hardy was still a lieutenant at the time of the battle.

"Band of brothers" was a phrase used by Rear-Admiral Horatio Nelson to refer to the captains under his command just before and at the Battle of the Nile in 1798. The phrase, taken from Shakespeare's St Crispin's Day Speech of Henry V, later came to be more generally applied to his relationship with the captains and men under his command, such as at the Battle of Trafalgar.

== Early allusion ==
One of Nelson's earliest uses of the phrase is in a letter written shortly after the Spanish entry into the war. Nelson, eager for action, had hoped to be given command of a squadron cruising off the Spanish coast, but was passed over. Dismayed, he wrote of his indignation and disappointment, but added:

Yet, if I know my own thoughts, it is not for myself, or on my own account chiefly, that I feel the sting and the disappointment! No! it is for my brave officers; for my noble-minded friends and comrades. Such a gallant set of fellows! Such a band of brothers! My heart swells at the thought of them!

Shortly afterwards, the French fleet sailed from Toulon under the command of Vice-Admiral Brueys, carrying Napoleon and a French invasion force bound for Malta and Egypt. The British commander-in-chief of the Mediterranean Fleet, Admiral Sir John Jervis reinforced Nelson with several ships of the line and sent him in search of the French. Nelson was initially unsuccessful, missing the French when they passed by, and invaded, Malta in June. They then sailed on to Egypt, and carried out a successful landing at Alexandria in early July. Nelson finally caught up with the French fleet on 1 August, anchored in Aboukir Bay. Nelson immediately prepared an attack, taking the French by surprise, and won a decisive victory, capturing or burning most of the fleet.

=== The Nile captains ===
Under Nelson's command at this time were:

Commander	Ship	Notes
Capt. Edward Berry	Vanguard	Nelson's flag captain
Capt. Alexander Ball	Alexander	
Capt. Davidge Gould	Audacious	
Capt. Henry D'Esterre Darby	Bellerophon	
Capt. Thomas Troubridge	Culloden	
Capt. John Peyton	Defence	
Capt. Thomas Foley	Goliath	
Capt. Thomas Boulden Thompson	Leander	
Capt. George Blagdon Westcott	Majestic	Killed during the battle
Capt. Thomas Louis	Minotaur	
Capt. Sir James Saumarez	Orion	Nelson's second in command
Capt. Benjamin Hallowell	Swiftsure	
Capt. Ralph Willet Miller	Theseus	
Capt. Samuel Hood	Zealous	
Lt. Thomas Hardy	Mutine	

Of the brothers, Nelson had already served alongside several. Miller had commanded HMS Captain as Nelson's flag captain at the Battle of Cape St Vincent in 1797, where Troubridge had commanded HMS Culloden. The Battle of Santa Cruz de Tenerife some months later reunited Miller and Troubridge, whilst Captains Hood and Thompson were also present. Andrew Lambert has written that the captains at the Nile were "outstanding officers", though he excepted Edward Berry, due to being "prone to serious errors of judgement at sea and in combat". In the immediate aftermath of the battle the surviving captains agreed to commission a sword and a portrait of Nelson as a "proof of their esteem" for his "prompt decision and intrepid conduct", prompting Nelson to stress that "the conduct of every officer was equal". Nelson wished to avoid the bitter controversy that had erupted after the Glorious First of June, when Lord Howe's dispatch had omitted mention of many of the captains who had fought under him. A similar situation had followed the Battle of Cape St Vincent, at which Nelson himself had fought. Several captains were passed over in Jervis's account, and became jealous of those who had had their exploits reported.

Nelson therefore acted to forestall any criticism, and also to ensure that all his captains were rewarded with Naval Gold Medals. This was particularly important as one of Nelson's closest confidants, Thomas Troubridge, had played virtually no part in the battle, after his ship had run aground before reaching the French. Nelson had an uncomfortable relationship with Saumarez, the senior captain in the squadron, and thus ex officio his second in command. A. T. Mahan thought that Troubridge was likely Nelson's preferred choice, but he found himself unable to replace Saumarez. When writing his dispatch Nelson made no mention of either Saumarez or Troubridge being senior to one another, either to avoid naming Saumarez as his second in command, or to spare Troubridge embarrassment after the grounding of his ship". After Lord Howe's dispatch, a number of captains at the Glorious First of June had not been awarded medals, and by employing the term "band of brothers", Nelson declared that all of the captains were worthy of recognition. His tactic was successful, even Howe had commented that the battle was particularly significant as "every captain distinguished himself".

After the battle Nelson wrote a number of letters and dispatches, often using the term "band of brothers" to refer to those who had fought alongside him. To his commanding officer, Lord St Vincent, he wrote, referring to Alexander Ball,

His activity and zeal are eminently conspicuous even amongst the Band of Brothers - each, as I may have occasion to mention them, must call forth my gratitude and admiration.

He wrote another dispatch whilst at Naples on 8 January 1799 to Earl Howe, declaring "I had the happiness to command a Band of Brothers...".

According to Andrew Lambert, while Nelson "considered all had been equally valiant, he did not mean that all had been equally able, or equally significant". Some had been competent and brave without particularly distinguishing themselves. The weakest of the brothers was held to be Davidge Gould. Though Gould had been in action before, and had not disgraced himself at the Nile or previously, Lambert considered that his "wooden, unimaginative handling of his ship during the battle stood in stark contrast to the bold, decisive action of his fellow captains, and fell far below the standard that Nelson expected". Darby, Peyton and Gould were not invited to join Nelson's forces again. Nelson had planned to replace Gould, selecting George Murray instead. Murray became the missing brother, his ship required a major refit and he was unable to take part in the battle.

== Tactics and later brothers ==
Nelson's ability to inspire his captains, and to leave them free to fight their ships as they believed best in the heat of the battle was linked to his description of the captains as his "band of brothers", and later came to be referred in a general manner to those under his command later in his career. His close consultation with them before actions was considered an important factor. When describing the preparations for Trafalgar, the Cambridge History of Warfare remarked "...Nelson consulted regularly with his captains until that 'band of brothers' understood his goals and methods..." Describing one of these conferences Nelson himself wrote

[W]hen I came to explain to them the "Nelson Touch", it was like an electric shock. Some shed tears, all approved...and from Admirals downwards it was repeated - "It must succeed, if ever they allow us to get at them! You are, my Lord, surrounded by friends whom you inspire with confidence".

Of the officers who served with him at the Nile, 13 would later reach flag rank. The exceptions were Westcott, killed during the battle, and Miller, who was killed during an accidental explosion aboard his ship in 1799. Some of the surviving brothers would serve under Nelson again. At the Battle of Copenhagen in 1801, Hardy had command of his own ship, whilst Foley was Nelson's flag captain. Thompson was also present, losing a leg in the action. Hardy was Nelson's flag captain aboard HMS Victory at Trafalgar, where Berry also commanded a ship.

Brother	Arms	Lieutenant	Commander	Captain	Rear Admiral	Vice Admiral	Admiral
Sir Edward Berry		1794	1796	1797	1821	—N/a	—N/a
Sir Alexander Ball		1778	1782	1783	1805	—N/a	—N/a
Sir Davidge Gould		1779	1782	1789	1807	1811	1825
Sir Henry D'Esterre Darby		1776	1781	1783	1804	1810	1819
Sir Thomas Troubridge		1781	1782	1783	1804	—N/a	—N/a
John Peyton		1772	1782	1783	1805	—N/a	—N/a
Sir Thomas Foley		1778	1782	1790	1808	1812	1825
George Blagdon Westcott		1777	1787	1790	—N/a	—N/a	—N/a
Sir Thomas Louis		1777	1781	1783	1804	—N/a	—N/a
Lord Saumarez		1778	1781	1782	1801	1806	1814
Sir Benjamin Hallowell		1783	1790	1793	1811	1819	1830
Ralph Willet Miller		1781	1794	1796	—N/a	—N/a	—N/a
Sir Samuel Hood		1780	1782	1788	1807	1811	—N/a
Sir Thomas Thompson		1782	1786	1790	1809	1814	—N/a
Sir Thomas Hardy		1793	1797	1798	1825	1837	—N/a

== Legacy ==
Nelson's inspirational and motivational abilities became the subject of later study. Some analysts see the "band of brothers" as "implying social equality in the service of the country". The phrase "band of brothers" has continued to be popular as a reference to a close-knit community, usually of military figures. However Brian Lavery noted that Nelson consulted only a privileged inner group of his officers, and never assembled all his captains on board the flagship. Instead he transmitted his orders and plans for battle in simple written instructions, occasionally reinforced by verbal briefings. He then relied on his captains' intelligence and experience to act decisively in the heat of battle.

The phrase was used to refer generally to captains and officers who served with Nelson, or simply during the same period as him. Nelson intended it to refer only to the captains who had fought with him at the Nile. Those captains under him at the Battle of Copenhagen in 1801 he described as "a very distinguish'd sett of fine fellows".

While Nelson was in England before returning to sea for the Trafalgar campaign, Lord Barham, First Lord of the Admiralty, offered Nelson the Naval List and asked him to take his pick, Nelson replied "Choose yourself, my Lord, the same spirit actuates the whole profession; you cannot choose wrong".

Andrew Lambert remarked that the phrase "band of brothers" has become a descriptor of the captains of the Royal Navy in Nelson's time "because it captures the unity and cohesion possessed by a supremely professional fighting force, led by an admiral of genius who inspired those under his command with a sense of fellowship, of shared endeavour, and of national pride".

== Bibliography ==
- Coetzee, Frans (1990), For Party Or Country: Nationalism and the Dilemmas of Popular Conservatism in Edwardian England, Oxford University Press, ISBN 0-19-506238-8
- Grint, Keith (2000), The Arts of Leadership, Oxford University Press, ISBN 0-19-829445-X
- Lambert, Andrew (2016), "Nelson's band of brothers (act. 1798)", Oxford Dictionary of National Biography (online ed.), Oxford University Press, doi:10.1093/ref:odnb/96379 (Subscription, Wikipedia Library access or UK public library membership required.)
- Mahan, Alfred Thayer (1969), Types of Naval Officers Drawn from the History of the British Navy: With Some Account of the Conditions of Naval Warfare at the Beginning of the Eighteenth Century, and of Its Subsequent Development During the Sail Period, Ayer Publishing, ISBN 0-8369-1093-1
- The Battle of the Nile (PDF), The Nelson Society, 7 October 2008, archived from the original (PDF) on 18 December 2008
- Nicolas, Nicholas Harris (1845), The dispatches and letters of vice admiral ... Nelson, with notes by sir N.H. Nicolas, vol. 3, p. 230
- Nicolas, Nicholas Harris (1846), The Dispatches and Letters of Vice Admiral Lord Viscount Nelson, with Notes, vol. 7, Colburn, pp. 26–27
- Parker, Geoffrey (2005), Life of Nelson, Cambridge University Press, ISBN 0-521-85359-1
- Sainsbury, A. B. (May 2008), "James Saumarez (1757–1836)", Oxford Dictionary of National Biography (online ed.), Oxford University Press, doi:10.1093/ref:odnb/24685 (Subscription, Wikipedia Library access or UK public library membership required.)
- Southey, Robert (1861), Life of Nelson, G. Bohn
