= George Blagdon Westcott =

British Royal Navy officer (1753–1798)

Captain George Blagdon Westcott
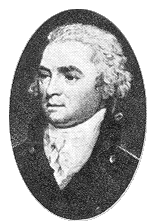
- George Westcott, detail of an engraving produced after the Battle of the Nile, depicting the 15 captains involved
- Born: 1753; Honiton, Devon
- Died: 1 August 1798 (aged 44–45); Aboukir Bay, Ottoman Egypt
- Military career
- Allegiance: Great Britain
- Branch: Royal Navy
- Service years: 1765/8–1798
- Rank: Captain
- Commands: HMS Fortune; HMS London; HMS Impregnable; HMS Majestic
- Conflicts: American War of Independence; Battle of Ushant (1778); Great Siege of Gibraltar; Battle of Ushant (1781); French Revolutionary Wars; Glorious First of June; Battle of the Nile

Captain George Blagdon Westcott (1753 – 1 August 1798) was a Royal Navy officer who served in the American War of Independence and French Revolutionary Wars. He was one of Rear-admiral Horatio Nelson's "band of brothers" at the Battle of the Nile in 1798, at which he was killed.

== Family and early life ==
Westcott was born in Honiton, Devon in 1753 and baptised on 23 April. His parents were Benjamin and Susanna Westcott, with Westcott's father working as a baker.^{[a]} He joined the Royal Navy sometime between 1765 and 1768, and by 1768 Westcott was serving as a master's mate onboard the frigate HMS Solebay.^{[b]} He spent five years aboard Solebay, rising to the rank of midshipman, and spending time under George Vandeput. He then moved aboard HMS Albion, where he spent the next three years under Samuel Barrington and John Leveson-Gower. He passed his lieutenant's examination on 10 January 1776 and received his promotion to that rank on 6 August 1777, moving aboard HMS Valiant. Under her captain, Samuel Granston Goodall, Valiant was present at the First Battle of Ushant on 27 July 1778, after which Westcott and Valiant joined the fleet under Sir Charles Hardy in 1779. He was present with Vice-Admiral George Darby's fleet when they relieved Gibraltar in April 1781.

In November that year Westcott moved aboard HMS Victory, then the flagship of Rear-Admiral Richard Kempenfelt. He was then present at Kempenfelt's victory at the Second Battle of Ushant on 12 December 1781. Wescott returned to Gibraltar under Lord Howe, and was then in action again at the Battle of Cape Spartel in October 1782. He briefly served aboard HMS Medway, before becoming first lieutenant of HMS Salisbury between 1786 and 1787. Salisbury was at that time the flagship of Commodore John Elliot.

== Command ==
On 1 December 1787 Westcott was promoted to commander and between 1789 and 1790 had command of the sloop HMS Fortune. He was promoted to captain on 1 October 1790, and became flag captain aboard HMS London. When London was paid off in late 1791, Westcott went onto half-pay until becoming Rear-Admiral Benjamin Caldwell's flag captain aboard HMS Impregnable in September 1793. Westcott was then present at the Glorious First of June in 1794, afterwards following Caldwell aboard HMS Majestic. He went to the West Indies, but returned with Sir John Laforey in June 1796. Majestic then joined the Channel Fleet, and was present at the Spithead Mutiny in April and May 1797. Majestic then joined John Jervis off Cádiz, where Westcott was ordered to take her to join Rear-admiral Nelson in the Mediterranean. Nelson was searching for the French fleet under Vice-Admiral François-Paul Brueys d'Aigalliers.

== Death ==
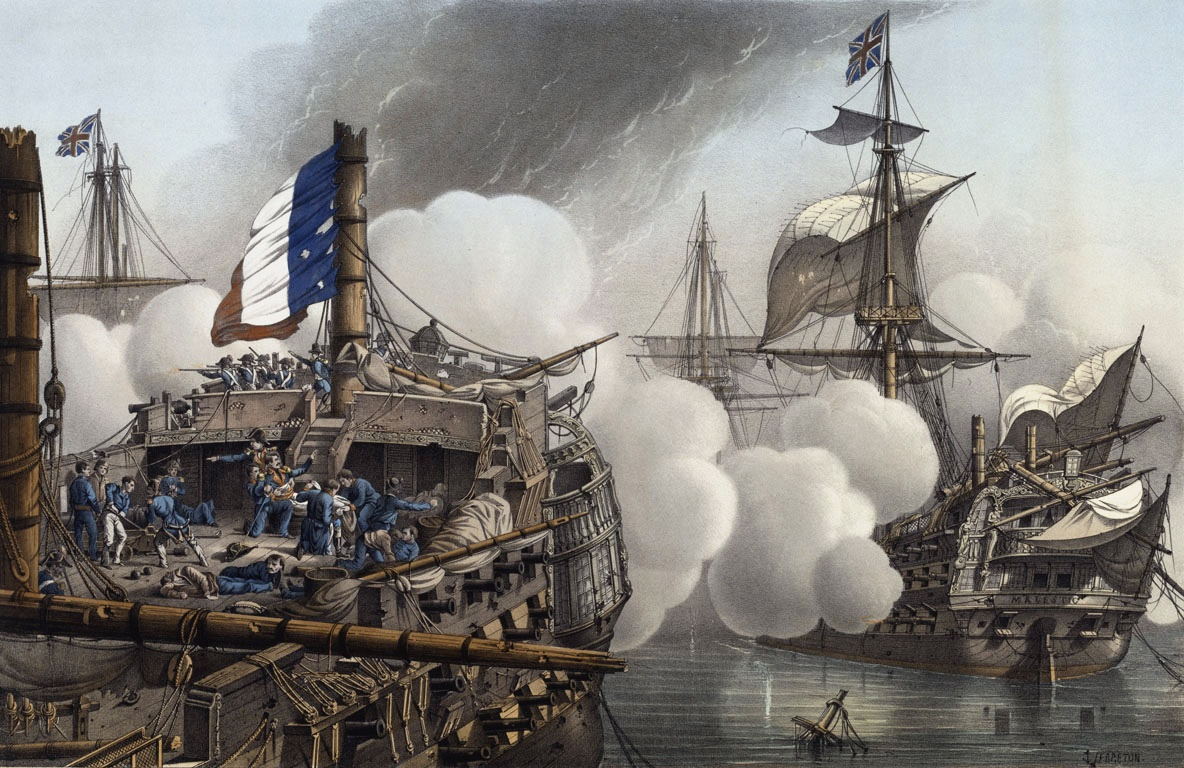
Tonnant under fire from HMS Majestic at the Battle of the Nile.

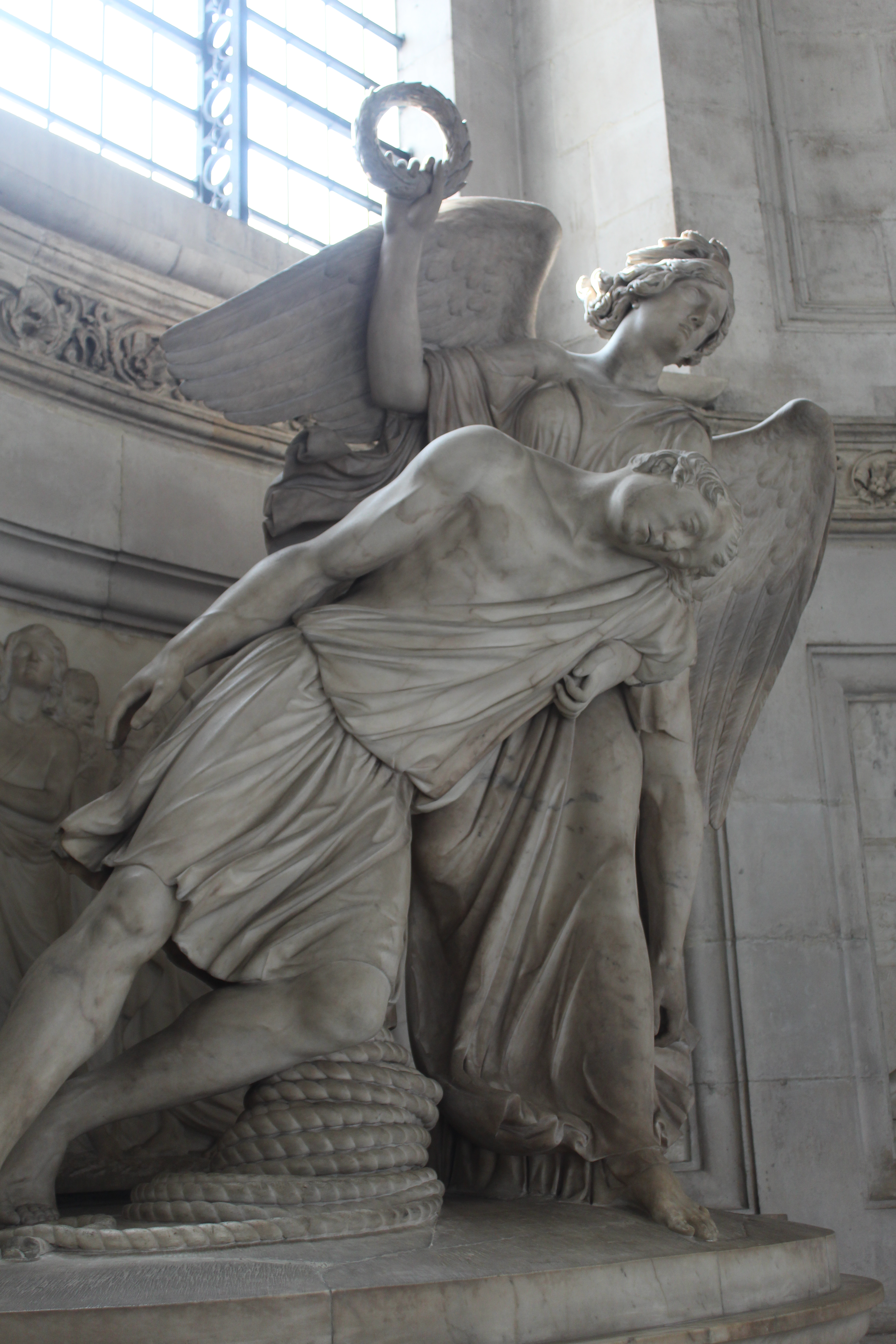
Westcott's memorial, St Paul's Cathedral

When Nelson located the French fleet at anchor at Aboukir Bay, he quickly ordered the British into the attack. Majestic was towards the rear of the British line, and did not come into action until late in the battle. In the darkness and smoke she collided with Heureux and became entangled in her rigging. Trapped for several minutes, Majestic suffered heavy casualties. Westcott was hit by a musket ball in the throat and killed. Majestic's first lieutenant, Robert Cuthbert took over and continued the battle. Cuthbert was confirmed as acting captain by Nelson the day after the battle.

Collingwood wrote of him:

A good officer and a worthy man; but, if it was a part of our condition to choose a day to die on, where could he have found one so memorable, so eminently distinguished among great days?

Westcott was buried at sea. A monument to his memory, sculpted by Thomas Banks, was erected in St Paul's Cathedral, and another in the church in his birthplace at Honiton. In January 1801, Nelson was passing through Honiton, on his way to take up a new command at Plymouth. Nelson invited his nearest surviving family to breakfast, and presented Mrs. Westcott with his own Nile medal, saying, "You will not value it less because Nelson has worn it." On 17 January 1801 he wrote to Lady Hamilton:

At Honiton I visited Captain Westcott's mother – poor thing, except from the bounty of government and Lloyd's, in very low circumstances. The brother is a tailor, but had they been chimney-sweepers it was my duty to show them respect.

== Notes ==
a. Some confusion exists. The Oxford Dictionary of National Biography suggests he was born around 1745, but Westcott's memorial in St Paul's Cathedral describes him as 46 at the time of his death in 1798, and parish records from Honiton indicate that he was baptised on 24 April 1753.

b. Laughton's biography implies an entry date of 1768, whilst Westcott's memorial states he had been serving in the navy for 33 years at his death.
