= John Peyton (Royal Navy officer) =

Officer in the Royal Navy during the American and French revolutionary wars

Rear-Admiral John Peyton
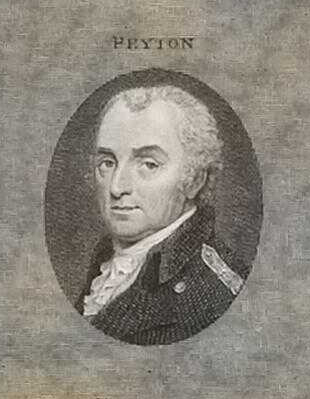
- John Peyton
- Born: 1752; Ardingly, Sussex
- Died: 2 August 1809 (aged 56–57) Lymington
- Buried: Milford on Sea
- Allegiance: Kingdom of Great Britain; United Kingdom
- Branch: Royal Navy
- Service years: 1766–1800
- Rank: Rear-Admiral

John Goodwin Gregory Peyton (1752 – 2 August 1809) was an officer in the Royal Navy during the American and French revolutionary wars. As a lieutenant, he fought alongside his father Joseph Peyton, at the Moonlight Battle off Cape St Vincent, and later, in 1798, commanded HMS Defence at the Battle of the Nile. He retired a Rear admiral in 1800 and died in 1809 at the age of 56.

== Early life and career ==
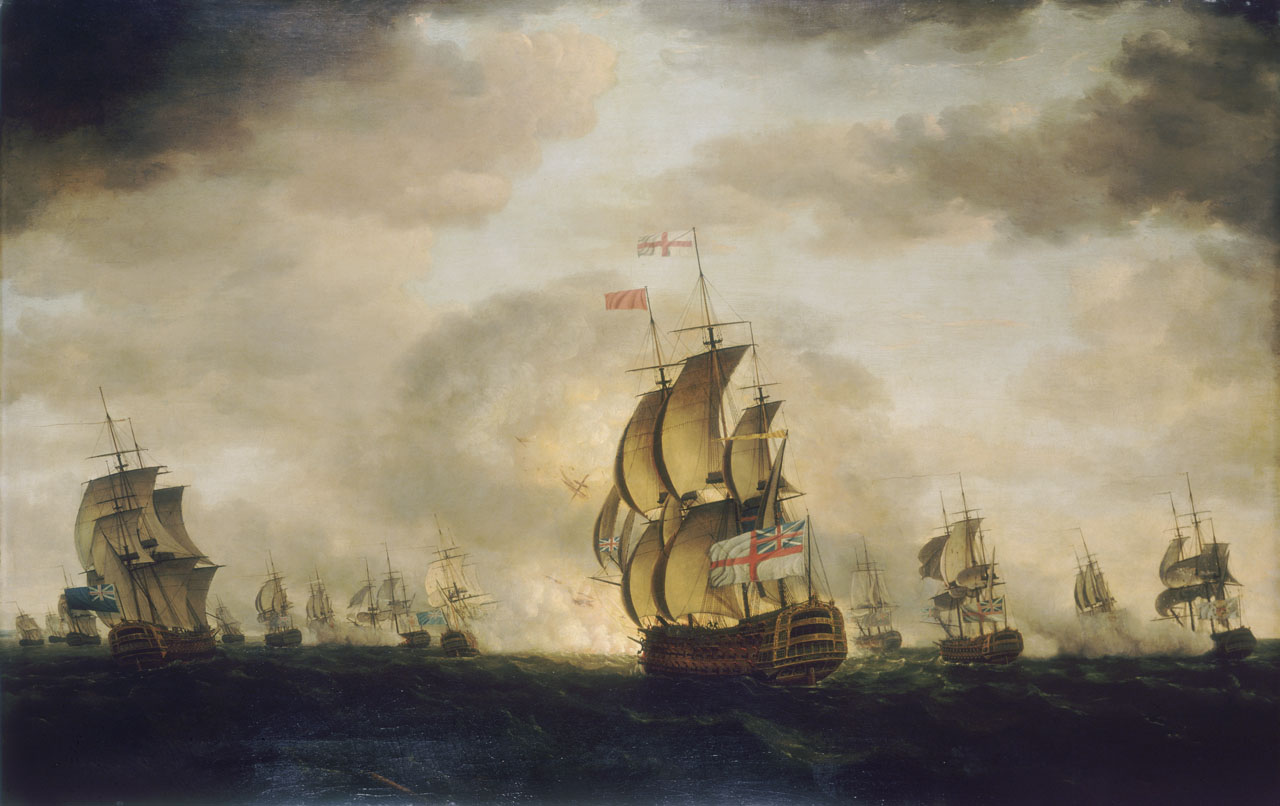
The Moonlight Battle, where Peyton fought alongside his father, Joseph, aboard HMS Cumberland

John Goodwin Gregory Peyton was born in Ardingly, Sussex in 1752 to Joseph Peyton and his wife Katherine. The Peytons were a naval family; at least five generations served and both his grandfather, Edward Peyton and his father attained the rank of admiral. John was one of seven children, five boys and two girls, and of his four brothers, all but one entered the Royal Navy: The eldest, named after his father, also became an admiral, the younger brother, William was an administrator, the youngest, Thomas, died while in command of HMS Monarch in 1801.

Peyton's early career is not well documented, and he is sometimes confused with other family members, but it is most likely that he is the Peyton registered aboard his father's ship, HMS Belleisle, in 1766. Promoted to lieutenant in 1772, he remained with his father, fighting in HMS Cumberland at the first Battle of Cape St Vincent in 1780.

== Command ==
Peyton's first command was the 12-gun cutter, HMS Kite, in which he captured the privateer, Fantasque off Dunkirk in March 1782. He made Post on 21 January 1783 when he commissioned the newly-launched HMS Carnatic. Peyton was assigned to another new ship in July 1794, the 38-gun HMS Seahorse, in which he served on the Irish Station. At some point in 1795, Peyton took command of HMS Ceres, sailing her to the Mediterranean in December.

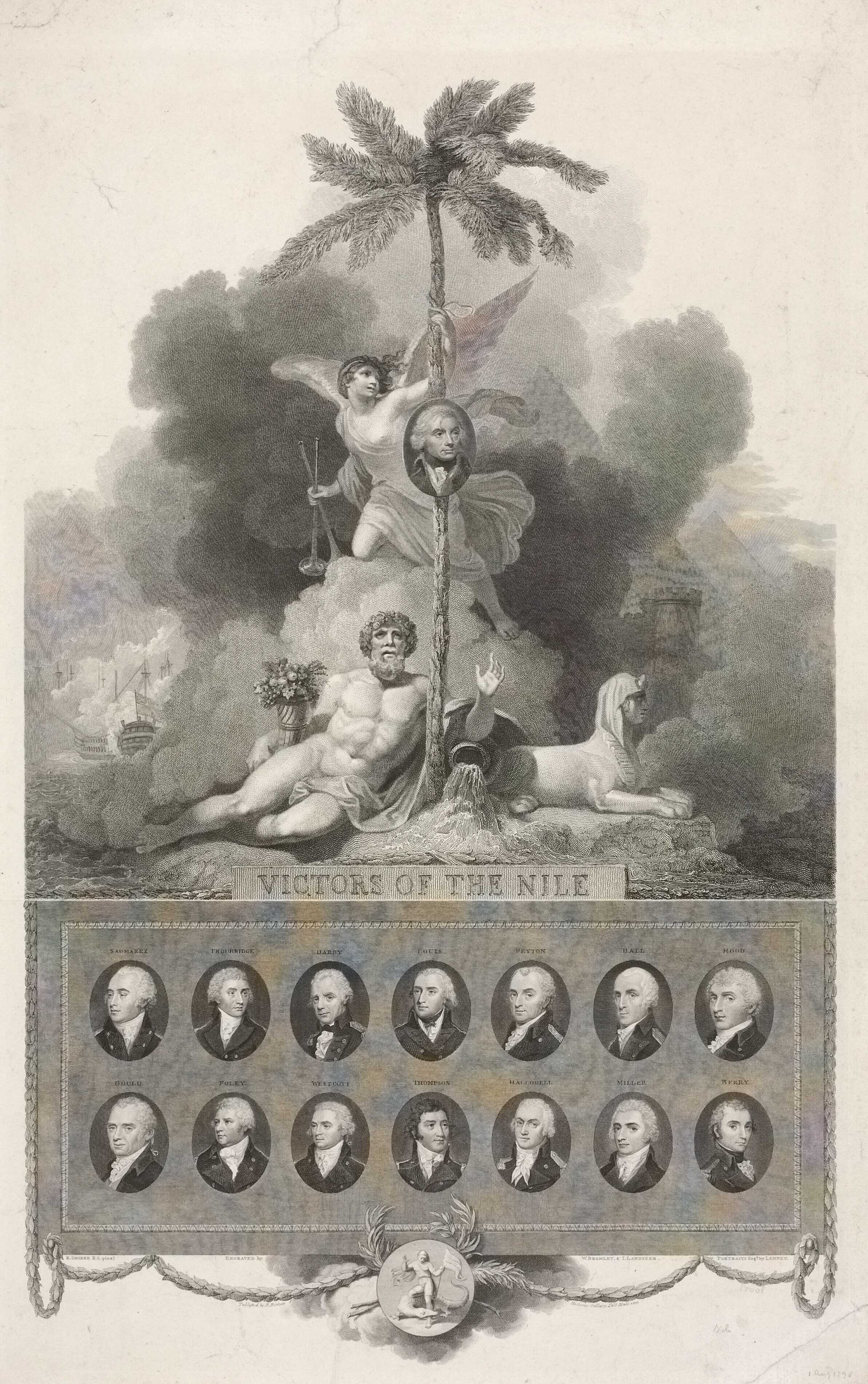
Nelson's Band of Brothers at the Nile. Peyton's portrait is in the top row, fifth from the left

Peyton was destined to become one of Nelson's Band of Brothers at the Battle of the Nile, when he took command of HMS Defence in 1798. Having returned to England, Peyton shared a coach journey with Fanny Nelson in March 1798 while on his way to join Horatio Nelson in HMS Vanguard for a journey out to the Mediterranean, where Peyton was to take command of his next ship. Later, despite his seniority by 15 years, Peyton was not consulted by Nelson, prior to the search for the French fleet, leaving the naval historian, Peter Hore to wonder whether those encounters, which undoubtedly would have given Nelson an opportunity to appraise one of his captains, might have influenced that decision.

Vanguard left England on 9 April 1798 and joined the Mediterranean Fleet off Cádiz twenty days later but Peyton did not join his new command until June. Both the ship and crew were in a poor condition; Defence was overdue a refit and had one of the longest sick lists in Nelson's fleet. Scurvy, ulcers and fever were common aboard and within a month, Peyton had succumbed to sickness himself, writing so in a letter to Nelson on 3 July. Despite these problems, Defence fought hard at the Nile, engaging Peuple Souverain on 1 August for three hours before bringing down her masts and moving on to attack Franklin.

On 13 August, Peyton wrote a letter to his wife which gives one of the few surviving first-hand accounts of the Nile battle.

== Later life ==
Peyton retired to Lymington in 1800, where he bought Priestlands, a large house with extensive grounds. He lived there with his wife, Susanna Gurnell (née Swinden), whom he had married in 1793, until his death, at the age of 56, on 2 August 1809. There is a memorial to him at All Saints Church, Milford on Sea.

== Arms ==
Coat of arms of Rear-Admiral John Peyton
Notes Rear admiral John Peyton, used the arms of his wife in an inescutcheon (his wife's maiden name was Swinden) Crest A griffin sejant Or. Escutcheon Sable, a cross engrailed Or, in the second quarter a mullet Argent. A crescent for difference. Motto Patior, potior.

== Sources ==
- Clarke, James Stainer; MacArthur, John (1810). The Life of Admiral Lord Nelson KB. London: T. Cadell & W. Davies. OCLC 183096009.
- Hore, Peter (2015). Nelson's Band of Brothers: Lives and Memorials. Barnsley.: Seaforth Publishing. ISBN 9781848327795.
- James, William (1827). The Naval History of Great Britain, Volume II, 1797–1799. London: Richard Bentley. ISBN 0-85177-906-9.
- Marshall, John (1828). Royal Naval Biography. London: Longman, Rees, Orme, Brown and Green. OCLC 1111834724.
- Winfield, Rif (2007). British Warships in the Age of Sail 1714–1792: Design, Construction, Careers and Fates. Barnsley: Seaforth Publishing. ISBN 978-1-84415-700-6.
- Winfield, Rif (2008). British Warships in the Age of Sail 1793–1817: Design, Construction, Careers and Fates. Barnsley: Seaforth. ISBN 978-1-86176-246-7.
