= HMS Impregnable (1786) =

Ship of the line of the Royal Navy

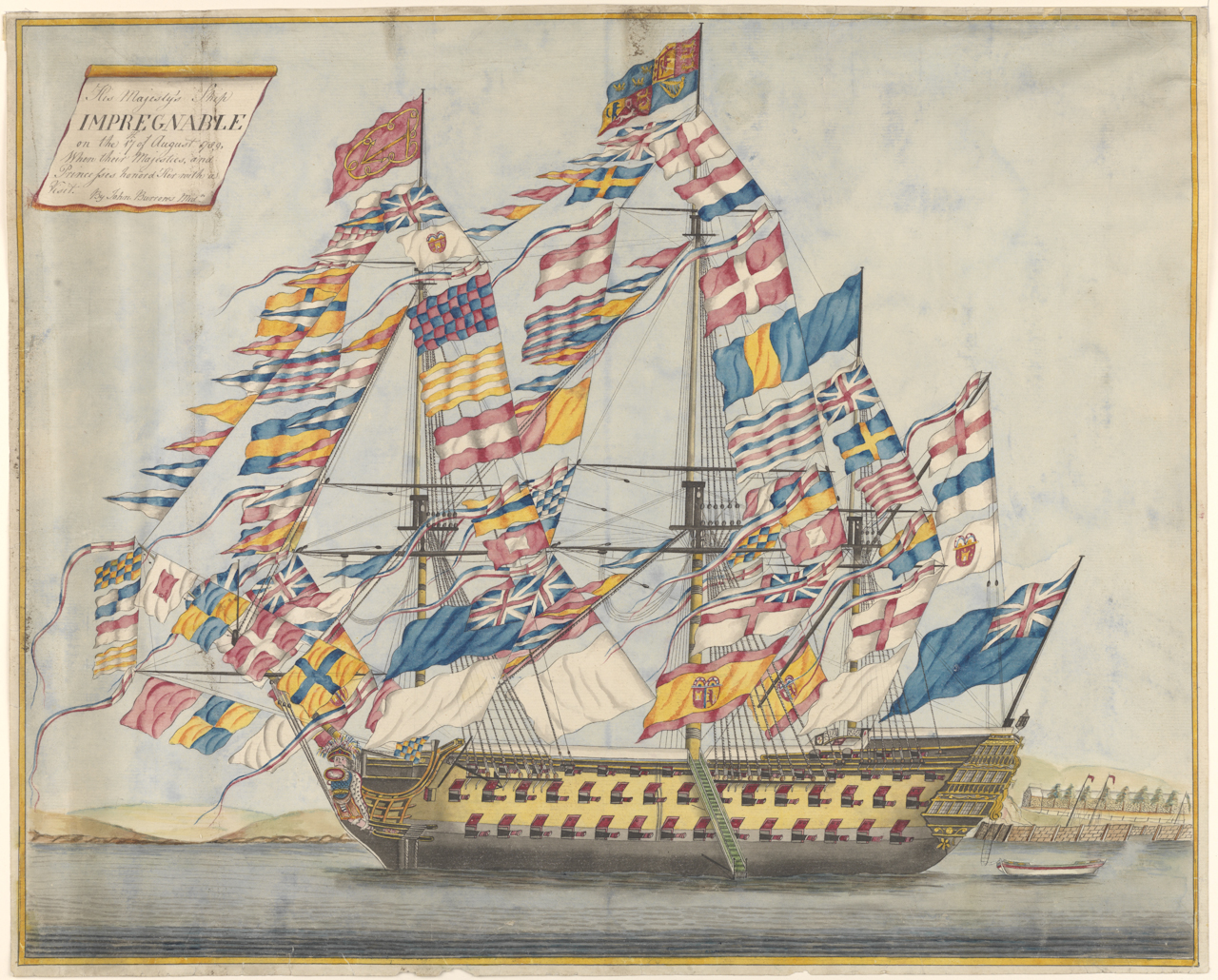
- HMS Impregnable on 17 August 1789, when King George III visited the ship

History

Great Britain
- Name: HMS Impregnable
- Ordered: 13 September 1780
- Builder: Deptford Dockyard
- Laid down: October 1781
- Launched: 15 April 1786
- Fate: Wrecked 18 October 1799
- Notes: Participated in: Glorious First of June

General characteristics
- Class & type: London-class ship of the line
- Tons burthen: 188647/94 (bm)
- Length: 177 ft 6 in (54.10 m) (gundeck)
- Beam: 49 ft (15 m)
- Depth of hold: 21 ft (6.4 m)
- Propulsion: Sails
- Sail plan: Full-rigged ship
- Armament: 98 guns: Gundeck: 28 × 32 pdrs; Middle gundeck: 30 × 18 pdrs; Upper gundeck: 30 × 12 pdrs; Quarterdeck: 8 × 12 pdrs; Forecastle: 2 × 12 pdrs

The plan of Impregnable

HMS Impregnable was a 98-gun second-rate ship of the line of the Royal Navy launched on 15 April 1786 at Deptford Dockyard. She was wrecked in 1799 off Spithead.

== Service ==
Impregnable was commissioned in October 1787 by Captain Thomas Pringle. In the following year command of the ship transferred to Captain Thomas Byard, and Impregnable served as flagship to Vice-Admiral Thomas Graves as the guardship at Plymouth Dockyard. In May 1790 she was refitted at Plymouth in preparation for service in the Channel Fleet at the cost of £3,923.16.11d. This was in response to the Spanish Armament, and Impregnable served as flagship to Rear-Admiral Sir Richard Bickerton from August. The ship continued in service during the Russian Armament of the following year, with her flag officer having changed to Rear-Admiral Phillips Cosby; at the end of this she was paid off in September.

Impregnable was recommissioned in September 1793 by Captain George Blagdon Westcott to serve as the flagship of Rear-Admiral Benjamin Caldwell, with the French Revolutionary Wars having begun. Under Caldwell and Westcott, she fought at the Glorious First of June in 1794. In October of that year Westcott was replaced in command by Captain Charles Cotton, but in a quick carousel of captains, Cotton was in turn replaced by Captain Andrew Mitchell in 1795, and Captain John Thompson took over from Mitchell in July of that year. Under Thompson Impregnable was paid off in August 1796, only to be recommissioned once again in June 1799, under Captain Jonathan Faulknor.

== Fate ==
Impregnable was lost off Chichester on 18 October. She had escorted a convoy of 12 merchantmen from Lisbon to the Isle of Wight and her master, Michael Jenkins, was anxious to get into Spithead that night. The result was that she ended up on the Chichester Shoals. Faulknor ordered the ship be lightened by cutting away the masts, and an attempt was made to anchor for the night. At dawn the crew discovered that she had beaten a mile and a half over the shoals and now lay in mud flats near the entrance to Langstone Harbour. The following day she was found to have bilged.

Faulknor determined that the ship could not be saved. A small flotilla of vessels from Langstone and Spithead dockyards was put to sea to assist, and successfully removed the crew, the ship's guns and other valuables. The Admiralty later sold Impregnable's remains to a Portsmouth merchant, A. Lindenegren. A court martial on 30 October 1799 dismissed Master Jenkins from the service.
