= French corvette Poulette (1781) =

History

France
- Name: Poulette
- Namesake: Hen
- Builder: Toulon
- Laid down: September 1780
- Launched: 22 March 1781
- In service: 30 June 1781
- Captured: January 1793

Great Britain
- Name: HMS Poulette
- Acquired: January 1793 by capture
- Honours and awards: Naval General Service Medal with clasp "14 March 1795"
- Fate: Burned as unserviceable 20 October 1796

General characteristics
- Class & type: Coquette-class corvette
- Type: 28-gun sixth rate (British service)
- Displacement: 850 tons
- Tons burthen: c.580 (bm)
- Length: c.120 ft 0 in (36.6 m) (overall); 106 ft 6 in (32.5 m) (keel)
- Beam: c.32 ft 0 in (9.8 m)
- Depth of hold: c.16 ft 0 in (4.9 m)
- Propulsion: Sails
- Sail plan: Sloop
- Complement: French service: 200 (war) & 120 (peace)
- Armament: French service: 20 × 8-pounder guns (main deck) + 6 × 6-pounder guns (spar deck)

Poulette was a French Coquette-class corvette built to a design by Joseph-Marie-Blaise Coulomb and launched in March 1781. She served the French navy until 1793, when the British captured her at Toulon. She served briefly in the Royal Navy, including at the battle of Genoa in 1795, until she was burned in October 1796, to prevent her falling into French hands.

== French career ==
On 18 December 1782, Poulette departed Toulon with the frigates Précieuse and Prosélyte to escort a convoy to the Caribbean, comprising the flûtes Gracieuse, Rhône and Durance.

In 1784, she sailed for a mission to the Middle East under Pierre-Dimas Thierry, Marquis de la Prévalaye, and in 1789, she was sent to Martinique.

In November - December 1790, she was under the command of lieutenant de vaisseau François-Paul Brueys d'Aigalliers, who sailed from Toulon to Algiers with M. Vallière, France's consul general in Algeria. She also carried dispatches for the naval station and French consuls in the Levant.

Between January and July 1793, she was under the command of lieutenant de vaisseau Farquharson-Stuart. She sailed from Villefranche to Calvi via Toulon. She then escorted a convoy of troop transports from Calvi to the Gulf of Palmas via Ajaccio before returning to Villefranche. She next cruised the Ligurian coast while escorting convoys between Genoa and Marseille. The British captured her at Toulon in 1793.

== British service ==
The British took her into service as a 28-gun sixth rate. Initially she remained under Farquharson-Stuart's command, in the French Division under Rear-Admiral Trogoff de Kerlessy.

On 1 July 1794, Commander Ralph Miller became her captain. Miller had volunteered to lead an assault on the French ships moored at Golfe Jouan, and Admiral Samuel Hood appointed him to command Poulette and fit her as fireship, with the intention of setting fire to the anchored French fleet. Miller eventually made five attempts to take her into the anchorage, but the wind prevented him on each occasion. Hood then abandoned the project.

Poulette was in the van division under Vice-Admiral Samuel Goodall at the naval battle of Genoa on 14 March 1795. The battle, between British and Neapolitan warships under Vice-Admiral William Hotham and a French fleet under Rear-Admiral Pierre Martin, ended in a British-Neapolitan victory. In 1847, the Admiralty authorized the issuance of the Naval General Service Medal with clasp 14 March 1795 to all surviving claimants from the action.

On 12 January 1796, Miller was next assigned to command Mignonne, but Admiral Sir John Jervis instead moved him to HMS Unite. Captain Jeremiah Edwards replaced Miller on Poulette.

== Fate ==
The British burnt Poulette and her sister ship Belette on 20 October 1796, at Ajaccio, in the face of the advancing French troops. The two sloops were not seaworthy enough for use in evacuating the island of Corsica.
