= Ralph Willett Miller =

Captain Ralph Willett Miller
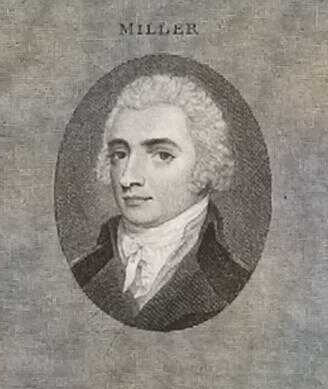
- Ralph Willett Miller
- Born: 24 January 1762; New York City
- Died: 14 May 1799 (aged 37) off Jaffa
- Military career
- Allegiance: United Kingdom of Great Britain and Ireland
- Branch: Royal Navy
- Service years: 1778 – 99
- Rank: Captain
- Commands: HMS Poulette HMS Unite; HMS Captain HMS Theseus
- Conflicts: American Revolutionary War; Battle of the Chesapeake; French Revolutionary Wars; Siege of Toulon; Battle of Cape St Vincent; Battle of the Nile; Siege of Acre

Captain Ralph Willett Miller (24 January 1762 – 14 May 1799) was a Royal Navy officer. He served during the American Revolutionary and the French Revolutionary Wars, eventually rising to the rank of captain. He was one of Vice-Admiral Horatio Nelson's Band of Brothers at the Battle of the Nile in 1798.

== Family and early life ==
Miller was born on 24 January 1762, the son of an American loyalist. His family's allegiance during the American Revolution caused the loss of their property and possessions. Miller was sent to England and entered the navy in 1778, serving aboard HMS Ardent with the fleet under Rear-Admiral James Gambier. He later served during the war as part of fleets under Samuel Barrington, George Rodney, Samuel Hood and Thomas Graves. He fought in a number of engagements, and was wounded three times. He served under Commodore William Hotham, and after the Battle of Fort Royal, Miller was promoted by Rodney to be lieutenant aboard HMS Terrible. He was present at the Battle of the Chesapeake on 5 September 1781, during which the Terrible was badly damaged, and later scuttled. Miller returned to the West Indies with Hood, and from there he went to England, arriving in late 1782, and by 20 December he was serving aboard HMS Fortitude.

== French Revolutionary Wars ==
By the outbreak of the wars with revolutionary France Miller was aboard the 98-gun second rate HMS Windsor Castle in the Mediterranean. After the end of the Siege of Toulon, Sir Sidney Smith placed Miller in charge of destroying the French ships and the arsenal.

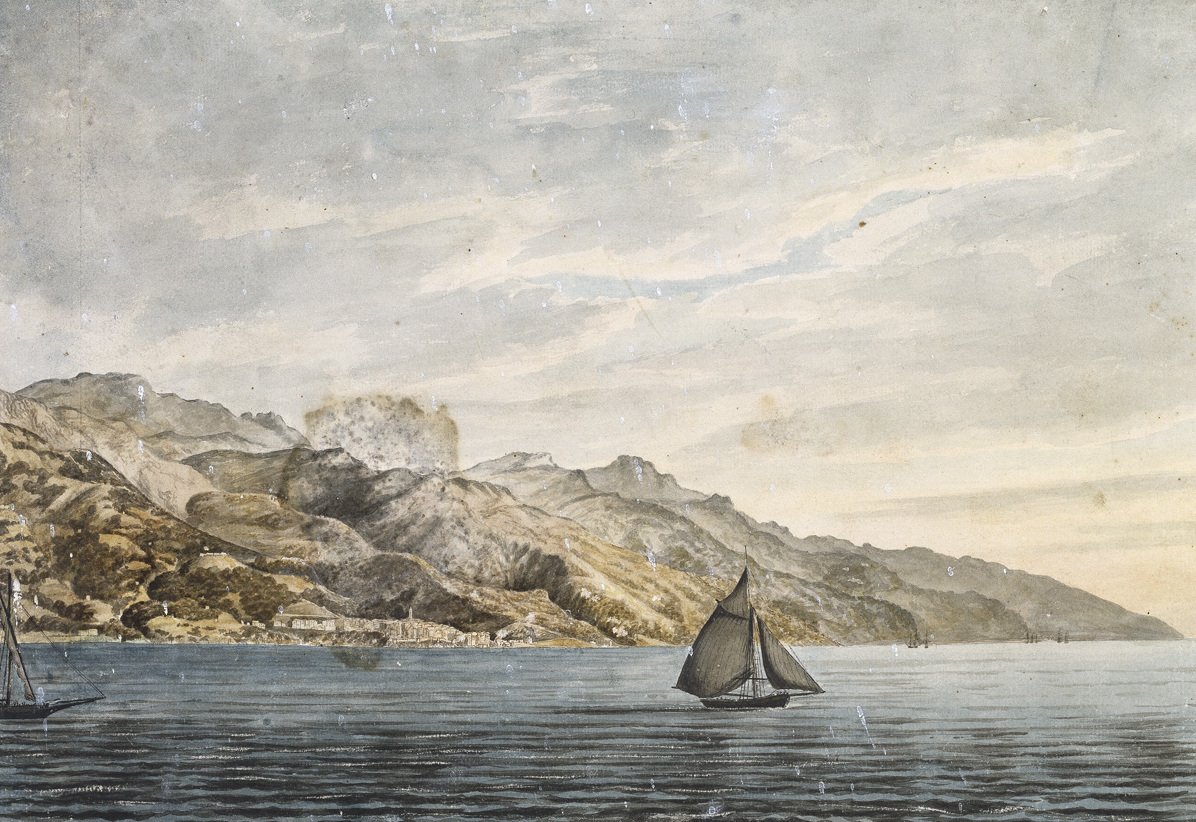
A Southern View of Bastia in the Island of Corsica from on board His Majesty's ship Victory during the Siege of that Town in May 1794

After the British withdrawal, Hood moved him to HMS Victory, where Miller distinguished himself leading actions against the French held towns on Corsica. He volunteered to lead an assault on the French ships moored at Golfe Jouan, and was appointed to command Poulette and ordered to fit her as fireship, with the intention of firing the fleet. He eventually made five attempts to take her into the anchorage, but the wind prevented him on each occasion. He was assigned to command HMS Mignonne on 12 January 1796, but the commander in chief, Sir John Jervis instead moved him to HMS Unite.

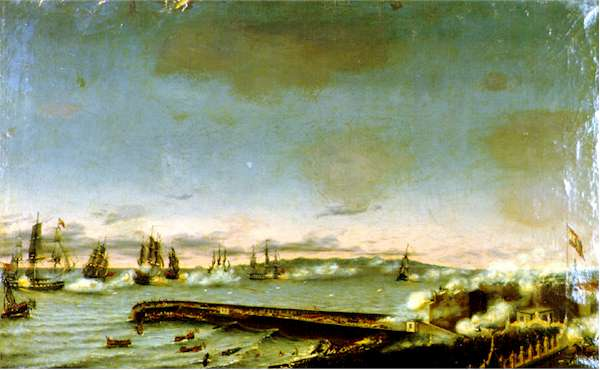
The Battle of Santa Cruz de Tenerife. Miller was involved in the failed attack, 1797.

Jervis assigned Miller to the Adriatic, but on the arrival of Commodore Horatio Nelson, Miller became Nelson's flag captain aboard HMS Captain. Miller commanded Captain at the Battle of Cape St Vincent on 14 February 1797. He followed Nelson aboard HMS Theseus in May 1797, and was with him during his time with the inshore squadron. He participated in the assault on Cádiz in June, and was involved in the unsuccessful Battle of Santa Cruz de Tenerife in July, Miller leading the landing parties from Theseus.

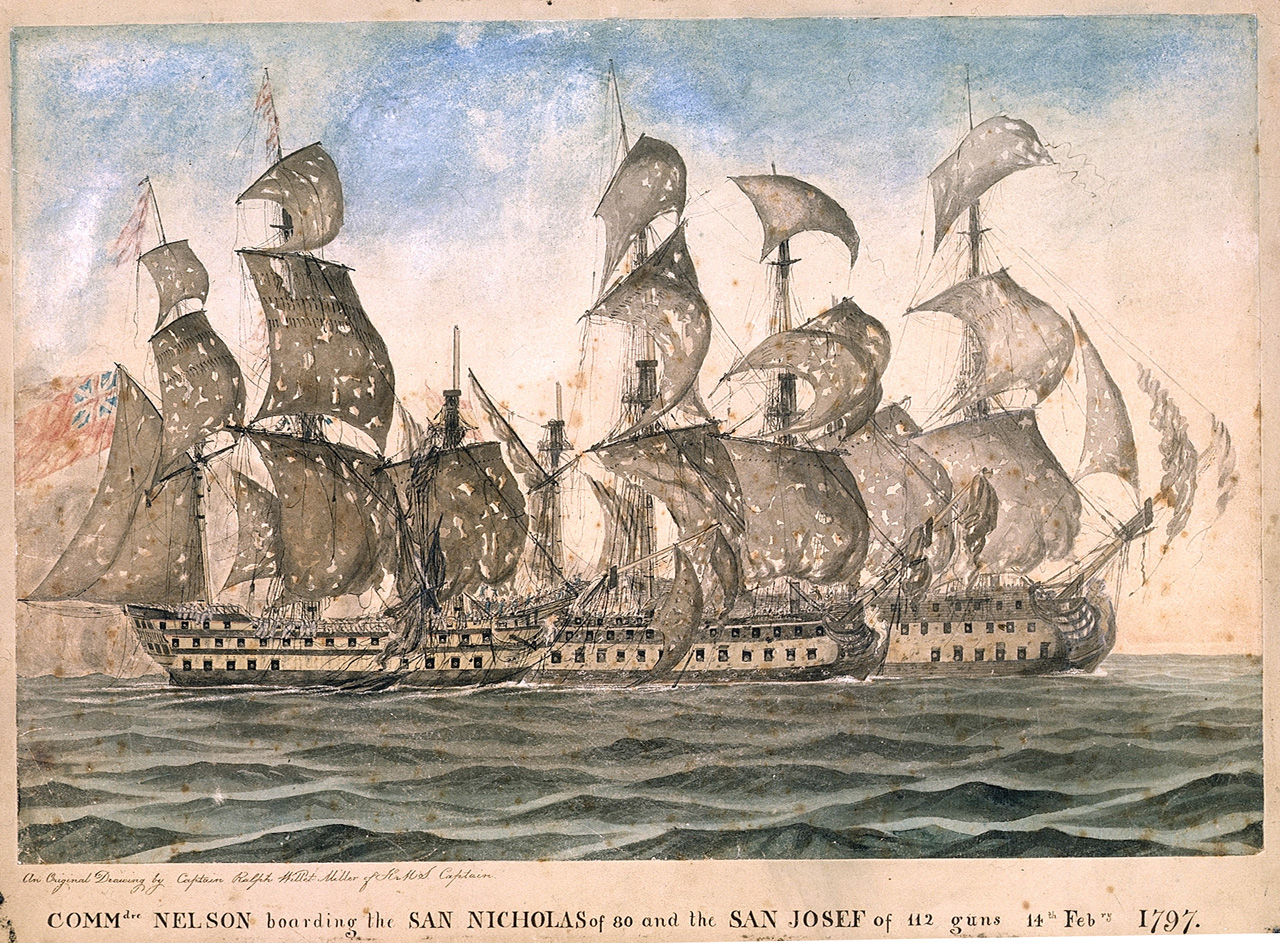
Commdre Nelson boarding the San Nicholas of 80 and the San Josef of 112 14 February 1797. A watercolour by Captain Ralph Willett Miller of HMS Captain at the battle of St Vincent

Miller and the Theseus were assigned to sail under Nelson, by now aboard HMS Vanguard. Miller was therefore present at the Battle of the Nile on 1 August, where he was wounded in the face, and was afterwards sent to Gibraltar with Captain Sir James Saumarez, in command of the captured French prizes. Miller and the Theseus returned to the Eastern Mediterranean in December, now acting as part of Sir Sidney Smith's fleet. He supported Smith at the Siege of Acre, and bombarded French positions between Acre and Jaffa.

== Death ==
News had reached Smith that a number of French frigates were preparing to sail from Alexandria to Jaffa to deliver stores and weapons for the French army. Smith ordered Miller to intercept them. Miller was preparing his ship to depart when an unknown accident occurred. Lieutenant England wrote in a report to Sir Sidney Smith

It is with extreme concern I have to acquaint you, that yesterday morning, at half-past nine o'clock, twenty 36-howitzer shells, and fifty 18-pounder shells, had been got up and prepared ready for service by Captain Miller's order...when in an instant...the whole was on fire and a dreadful explosion took place.

The ship was severely damaged, her aft part almost totally destroyed and the rest on fire. The crew fought the fire and were able to save the ship, but as Lieutenant England reported

Our loss from the explosion, I here lament, has been very great; and Captain Miller, I am sorry to add, is of the number killed, which amount to 20; drowned, 9; and 45 wounded.

Nelson wrote on learning of Miller's death that

he is not only a most excellent and gallant officer, but the only truly virtuous man that I ever saw.

Another of Nelson's band of brothers who had fought at the Nile, Edward Berry, suggested that a memorial to Miller be created. Nelson supported the proposal, and one was sculpted by John Flaxman, and installed in St Paul's Cathedral. Miller left a widow and two young daughters. The government awarded his family a pension of £100 a year.
