= Culloden-class ship of the line =

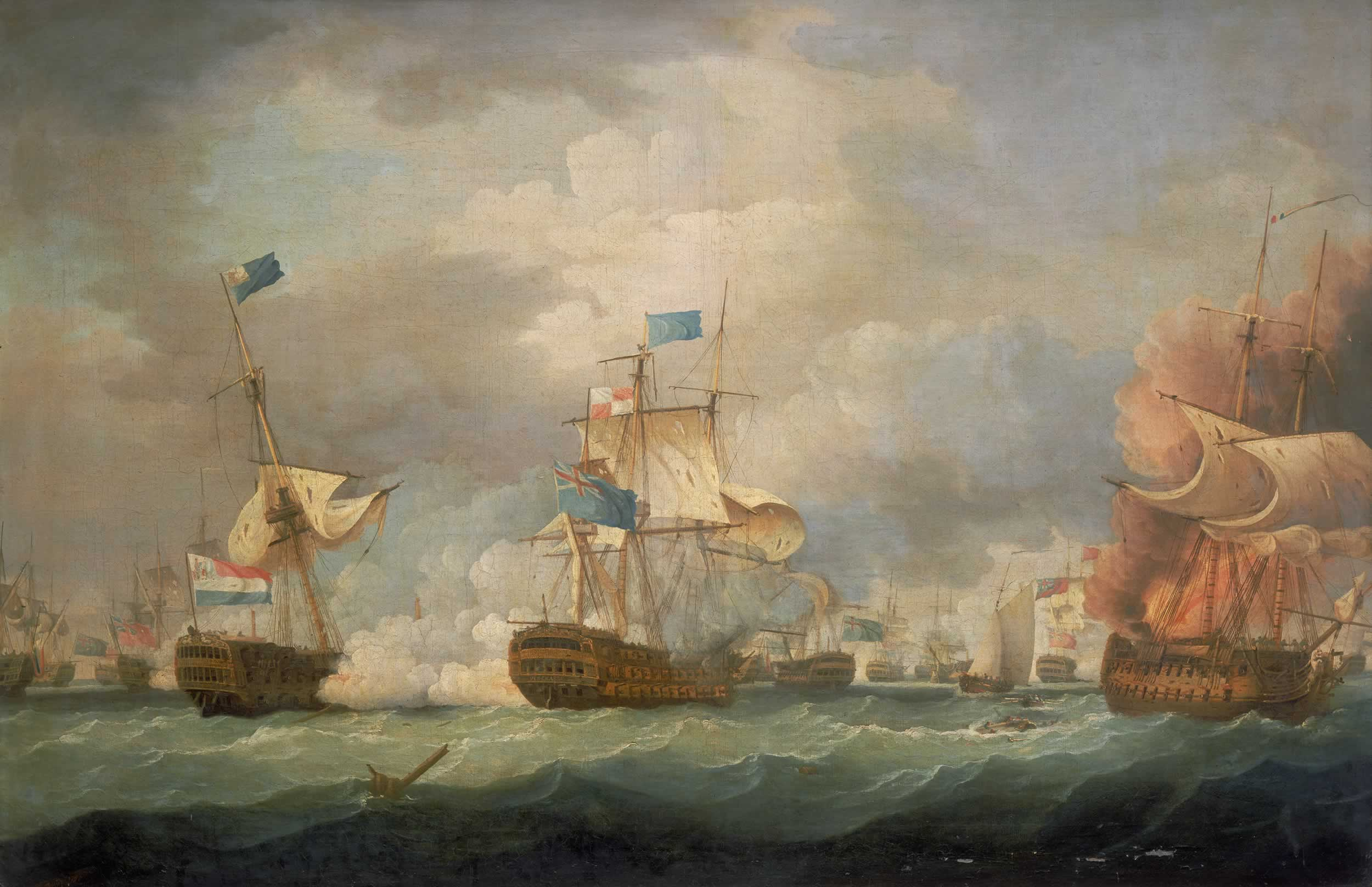
- HMS Venerable (centre) at the Battle of Camperdown

Class overview
- Name: Culloden
- Operators: Royal Navy; French Navy
- Preceded by: Royal Oak-class
- Succeeded by: Alfred-class
- In service: 18 May 1776 - 1861
- Completed: 8
- Lost: 2

General characteristics
- Type: Ship of the line
- Length: 170 ft (52 m) (gundeck); 139 ft 8 in (42.57 m) (keel)
- Beam: 47 ft 2 in (14.38 m)
- Propulsion: Sails
- Armament: 74 guns: Gundeck: 28 × 32-pounders; Upper gundeck: 28 × 18-pounders; Quarterdeck: 14 × 9-pounders; Forecastle: 4 × 9-pounders
- Notes: Ships in class include: Culloden, Thunderer, Venerable, Terrible, Victorious, Ramillies, Hannibal, Theseus

The Culloden-class ships of the line were a class of eight 74-gun third rates, designed for the Royal Navy by Sir Thomas Slade. The Cullodens were the last class of 74s which Slade designed before his death in 1771.

== Ships ==
- HMS Culloden

Builder: Deptford Dockyard
Ordered: 30 November 1769
Launched: 18 May 1776
Fate: Wrecked, 1781

- HMS Thunderer

Builder: Wells, Rotherhithe
Ordered: 23 August 1781
Launched: 13 November 1783
Fate: Broken up, 1814

- HMS Venerable

Builder: Perry, Wells & Green, Blackwall Yard
Ordered: 9 August 1781
Launched: 19 April 1784
Fate: Wrecked, 1804

- HMS Terrible

Builder: Wells, Rotherhithe
Ordered: 13 December 1781
Launched: 28 March 1785
Fate: Broken up, 1836

- HMS Victorious

Builder: Perry, Blackwall Yard
Ordered: 28 December 1781
Launched: 27 April 1785
Fate: Broken up, 1803

- HMS Ramillies

Builder: Randall, Rotherhithe
Ordered: 19 June 1782
Launched: 12 July 1785
Fate: Broken up, 1850

- HMS Hannibal

Builder: Perry, Blackwall Yard
Ordered: 19 June 1782
Launched: 15 April 1786
Fate: Captured, 1801

- HMS Theseus

Builder: Perry, Blackwall Yard
Ordered: 11 July 1780
Launched: 25 September 1786
Fate: Broken up, 1814
