= HMS Theseus (1786) =

Culloden-class ship of the line of the Royal Navy

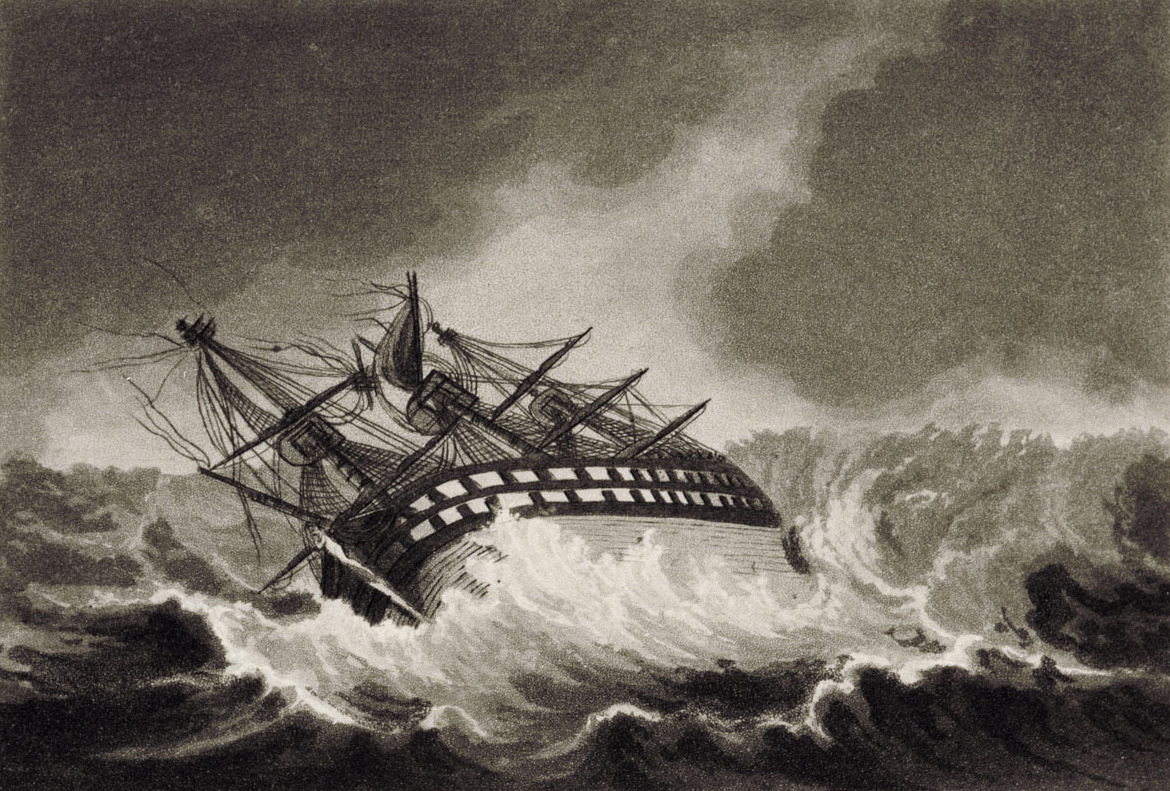
- Illustration of Theseus caught in the 1804 Antigua–Charleston hurricane off Hispaniola

History

Great Britain
- Name: Theseus
- Namesake: Theseus
- Ordered: 11 July 1780
- Builder: Perry, Blackwall Yard
- Laid down: 3 September 1783
- Launched: 25 September 1786
- Fate: Broken up, 1814
- Notes: Participated in: Battle of Santa Cruz de Tenerife; Battle of the Nile; Siege of Acre.; Battle of the Basque Roads

General characteristics
- Class & type: Culloden-class ship of the line
- Tons burthen: 1660 (bm)
- Length: 170 ft (52 m) (gundeck)
- Beam: 47 ft 2 in (14.38 m)
- Depth of hold: 19 ft 11 in (6.07 m)
- Propulsion: Sails
- Sail plan: Full-rigged ship
- Armament: Gundeck: 28 × 32-pounder guns; Upper gundeck: 28 × 18-pounder guns; QD: 14 × 9-pounder guns; Fc: 4 × 9-pounder guns

HMS Theseus was a 74-gun third-rate ship of the line of the Royal Navy. One of the eight Culloden-class ships designed by Thomas Slade, she was built at Perry, Blackwall Yard, London and launched on 25 September 1786.

== Service ==
An anchor from Theseus, left behind in the 1797 battle on display in Santa Cruz de Tenerife

Theseus was the flagship of Rear Admiral Horatio Nelson's fleet for the 1797 Battle of Santa Cruz de Tenerife. Day to day command was vested in her flag captain Ralph Willett Miller. The British were defeated in the battle and Nelson was wounded by a musket ball while aboard the Theseus, precipitating the amputation of his right arm.

Despite the defeat, morale and good order were retained aboard the ship. In August 1797 ship's surgeon Robert Tainsh reported a mere nine cases of illness aboard, with little incidence of scurvy and a ready supply of antiscorbutics. An outbreak of ulcers was attributed to the overuse of salted provisions and addressed by Miller's insistence on ensuring a supply of onions and lemons as part of daily rations. Also with Miller's approval, the lower deck ports were periodically washed with nitrous acid to reduce the risk of mould, windsails were installed to encourage a flow of fresh air below decks and the crew's hammocks were ordered to be aired three times a week.

=== Battle of the Nile ===
In 1798, Theseus took part in the decisive Battle of the Nile, under the command of Captain Ralph Willett Miller. The Royal Navy fleet was outnumbered, at least in firepower, by the French fleet, which boasted the 118-gun ship-of-the-line L'Orient, three 80-gun warships and nine of the popular 74-gun ships. The Royal Navy fleet in comparison had just thirteen 74-gun ships and one 50-gun fourth-rate.Theseus had been disguised as a first-rate ship during the battle.

During the battle Theseus, along with Goliath, assisted Alexander and Majestic, who were being attacked by a number of French warships. The French frigate Artemise surrendered to the British, with the crew setting fire to their ship to prevent it falling into the hands of the British. Two other French ships Heureux and Mercure ran aground and soon surrendered after a brief encounter with three British warships, one of which was Theseus.

The battle was a success for the Royal Navy, as well as for the career of Admiral Nelson. It cut supply lines to the French army in Egypt, whose wider objective was to threaten British India. The casualties were heavy; the French suffered over 1,700 killed, over 600 wounded and 3,000 captured. The British suffered 218 dead and 677 wounded. Nine French warships were captured and two destroyed. Two other French warships managed to escape. Theseus had five sailors killed and thirty wounded, included one officer and five Royal Marines.

=== Siege of Acre ===
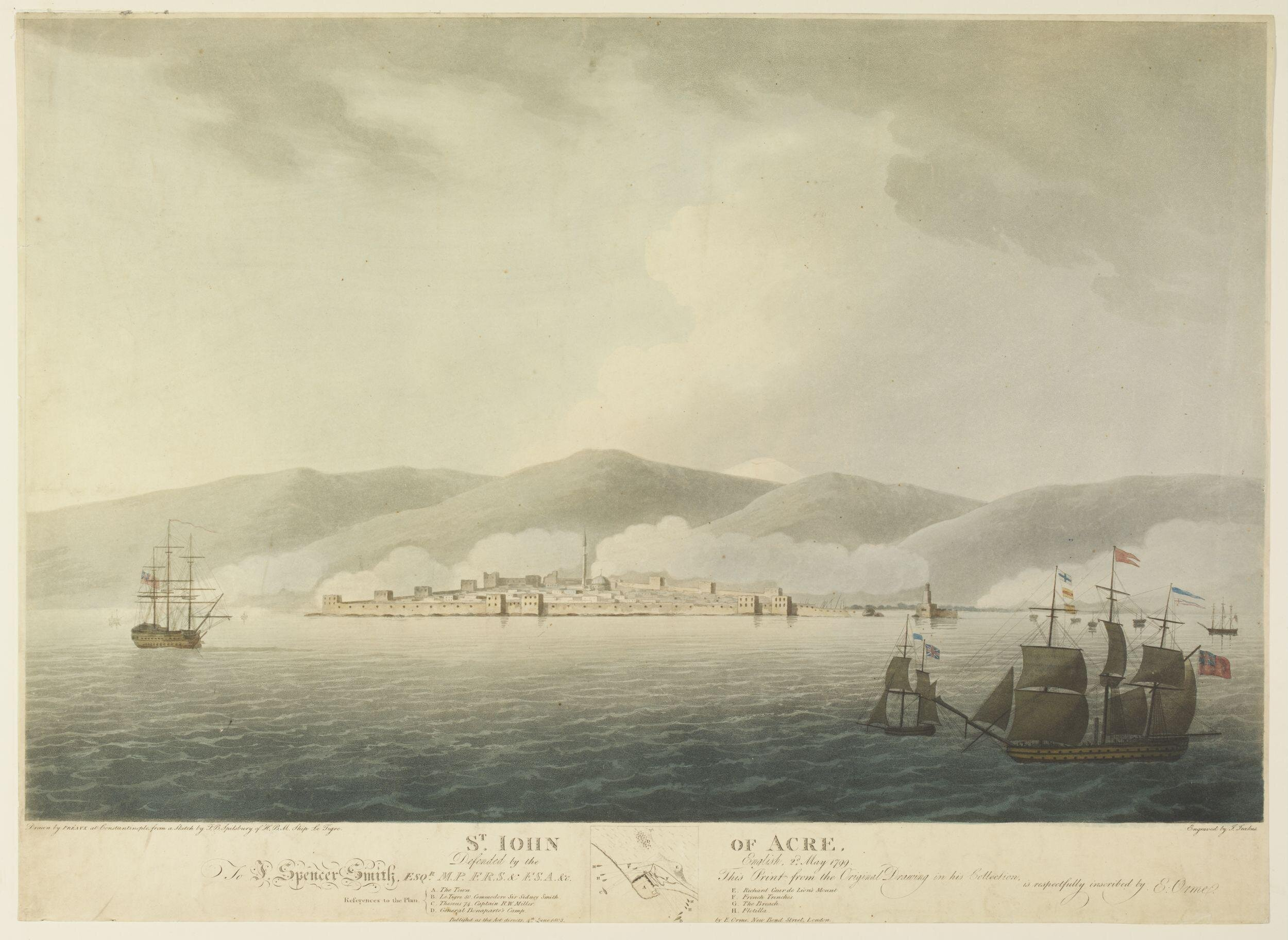
Theseus (on the left) defending St. John Of Acre, 2 May 1799

Theseus played a less successful role in the 1799 Siege of Acre, under the command of Captain Ralph Willett Miller. On 13 May 1799 she reached the nearby port of Caesarea, and Miller ordered the ship readied for action in bombarding Acre the following morning. A large quantity of ammunition was brought to the deck for use by the ship's guns, including more than 70 18-pound and 36-pound shells. At 9.30am on the 14th, the ammunition was accidentally ignited while the ship was under way. The resulting explosion set fire to the deck, mainmast and mizzen mast, and killed Miller and 25 other men. Another 45 crew members were injured.

Flames quickly spread between Theseus' decks, and a second detonation of ammunition stores destroyed the poop and quarterdecks and toppled the main mast over the starboard bow. A further ten men were killed before the fire was brought under control, leaving the ship unserviceable for the Acre campaign.

=== Later service ===
Four years later a refitted Theseus took part in the Blockade of Saint-Domingue in 1803, under Captain John Bligh.

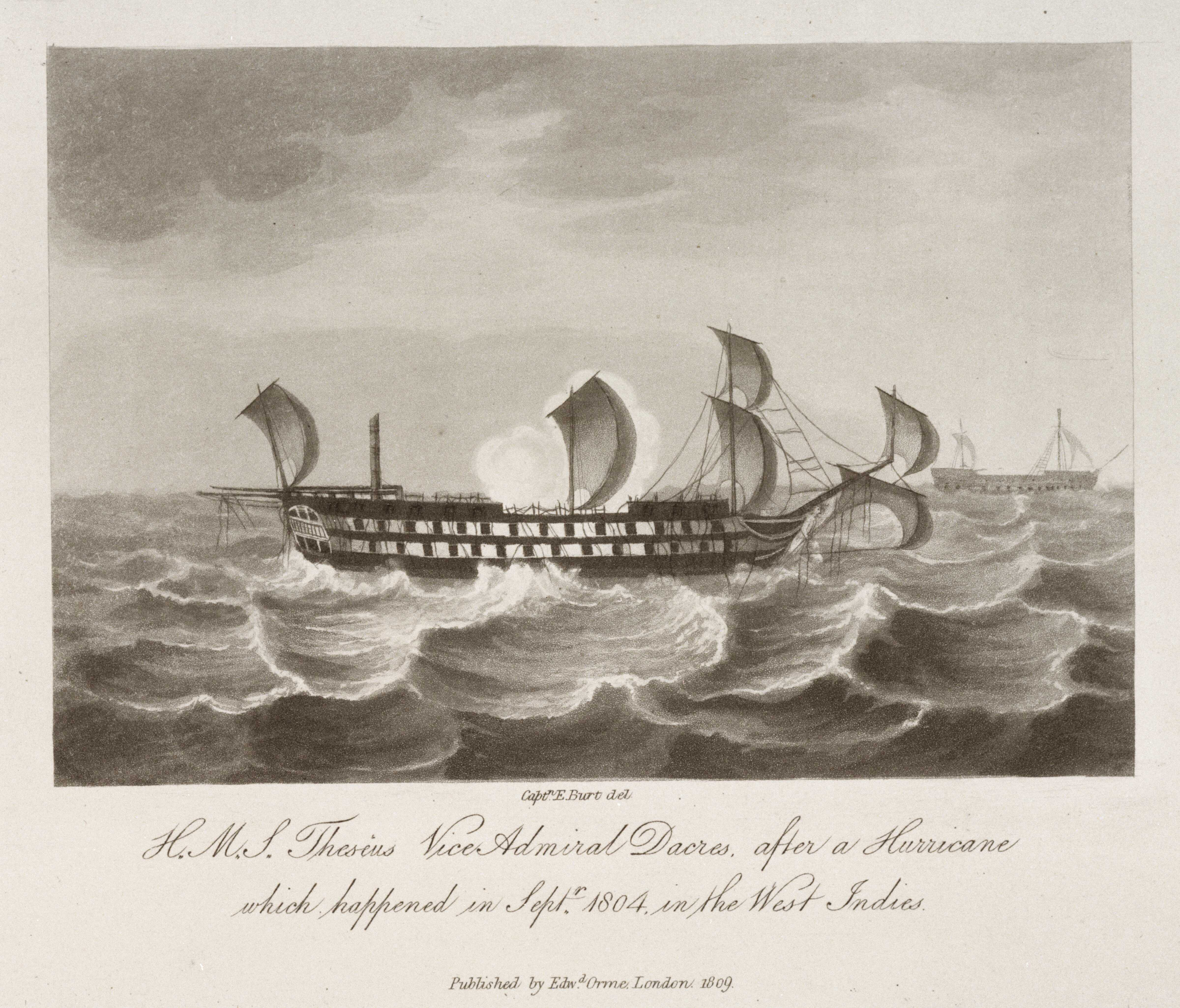
Theseus, seen after she was caught in a Hurricane off San Domingo between 4 and 11 September 1804. Theseus and HMS Hercule were badly damaged, but eventually survived to reach Port Royal on 15 September

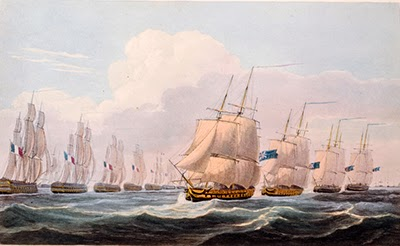
Capt J. Beresford leading the British squadron in Theseus on 24 February 1809

She also took part in the Battle of the Basque Roads in 1809. Lord Cochrane initiated a daring attack, led by fire ships and other explosive vessels, in an attempt to cause chaos among their target, an anchored French squadron. Many of the French ships were subsequently run aground due to the havoc that this attack caused. The enemy squadron would probably have been completely destroyed had the Commander-in-Chief, Admiral Lord Gambier, not hesitated over necessary decisions, such as to deploy the main fleet which instead lay in wait for their orders. Thus the remnants of the French escaped destruction.

Theseus was broken up at Chatham in 1814.

== In popular culture ==
In the Patrick O'Brian novel Master and Commander, Capt. Jack Aubrey is said to have served aboard HMS Theseus early in his career.
