= Benjamin Caldwell =

Royal Navy Admiral (1739–1820)

Admiral Sir Benjamin Caldwell GCB
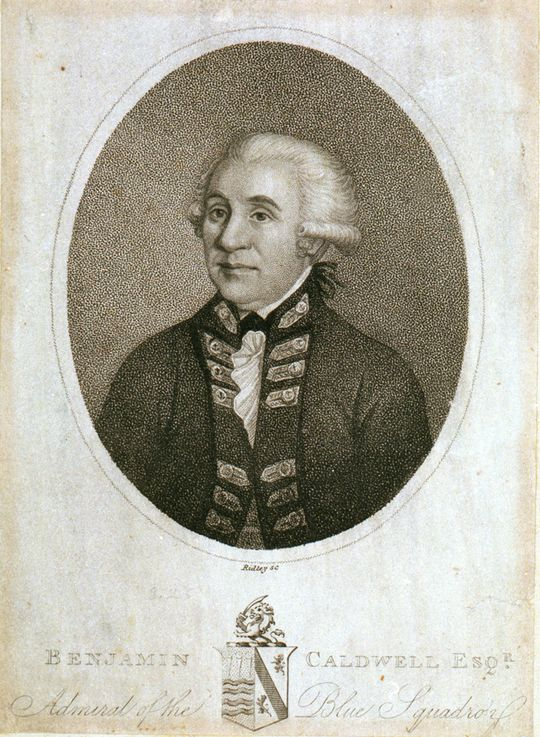
- Sir Benjamin Caldwell
- Born: 31 January 1739; Liverpool
- Died: November 1820; Basingstoke, Hampshire
- Military career
- Allegiance: United Kingdom
- Branch: Royal Navy
- Service years: 1754 to 1795
- Rank: Royal Navy Admiral
- Commands: HMS Martin; HMS Milford; HMS Rose; HMS Emerald; HMS Hannibal; HMS Berwick; HMS Cumberland; HMS Impregnable; HMS Majestic; Leeward Islands Station
- Conflicts: Seven Years' War; Battle of Lagos; Battle of Quiberon Bay; American Revolutionary War; Battle of Ushant; Battle of the Saintes; French Revolutionary Wars; Glorious First of June
- Awards: Knight Grand Cross of the Order of the Bath

Admiral Sir Benjamin Caldwell, GCB (31 January 1739 – November 1820) was a senior and experienced British Royal Navy officer of the eighteenth century. His many victories and achievements were overshadowed by his acrimonious departure from the Navy during the French Revolutionary Wars after highly publicised disputes with Admiral Lord Howe and Admiral Sir John Jervis, over perceived slights against his name following the battle of the Glorious First of June in 1794. As a result of these disputes, Caldwell was overlooked for future employment and only received recognition for his service from King George IV months before his death.

== Early career ==
Caldwell was born in Liverpool in 1739, the son of Dublin solicitor Charles Caldwell and his wife Elizabeth. Caldwell was one of ten children in his family; his sister married General Sir Phineas Riall and he was a younger brother of Andrew Caldwell, a noted solicitor in Dublin. At 15 in 1754, Caldwell attended the Royal Naval Academy, Portsmouth and graduated two years later into the fourth-rate HMS Isis, where he remained for three years.

== Seven Years' War ==
In 1759 Caldwell joined HMS Namur, the flagship of Admiral Edward Boscawen in which he participated in the victories of the Battle of Lagos and Battle of Quiberon Bay in the same year.

Profiting from his service in Namur, Caldwell was promoted to lieutenant in HMS Achilles and in her saw out the Seven Years' War. In 1762 he commanded the sloop HMS Martin and in 1765 became captain of the frigate HMS Milford. Caldwell later commanded the small frigate HMS Rose until the outbreak of the American War of Independence when he was transferred to HMS Emerald on the North American Station blockading ports, raiding and escorting convoys along the American eastern seaboard.

== American War of Independence ==
In December 1779, Caldwell was given the new fourth-rate HMS Hannibal, moving to the new ship of the line HMS Agamemnon in 1781 with the Channel Fleet. Caldwell commanded this ship at the Second Battle of Ushant under Richard Kempenfelt with success and the following year had sailed for the Caribbean for the largest and most decisive fleet action of the war, the Battle of the Saintes, where Sir George Rodney successfully broke the French line and captured five ships. Caldwell was again distinguished in the action and continued on the North American station until the war's end in 1783.

== Peacetime ==
Caldwell spent the next four years in semi-retirement, using the opportunity to marry Charlotte Osborn, daughter of admiral and politician Henry Osborn.^{[a]} In 1787 he returned to sea again for several months as captain of HMS Alcide and in 1790 during the Spanish armament he took over HMS Berwick. A more permanent commission was not however forthcoming until 1793, when at the outbreak of the French Revolutionary Wars, Caldwell was promoted to rear-admiral, raising his flag in HMS Cumberland.

== Glorious First of June ==
Caldwell moved from the Cumberland after only a short period and took over HMS Impregnable, a 98-gun second rate in the Channel Fleet of Admiral Lord Howe. With the rest of Howe's fleet, Impregnable was present at the Glorious First of June, at which Howe attempted to destroy a large French fleet protecting a grain convoy. The convoy escaped the British, but seven French ships were taken and the rest driven back to France. Impregnable was heavily engaged in the action and suffered 31 casualties but along with many officers, Caldwell was overlooked in Howe's dispatch to the Admiralty. Unmentioned in the dispatch, Caldwell's part in the action was not celebrated in Britain and Caldwell was even denied a commemorative medal issued to the captains who had fought at the battle.

Caldwell was infuriated by this snub, and became even more so when the Admiralty endorsed Howe's version of events despite an outcry from the overlooked officers. Transferred to the West Indies under Sir John Jervis as a vice-admiral in HMS Majestic, Caldwell attempted to put his feelings behind him and was even briefly made commander in chief of the Leeward Islands Station when Jervis returned to England in 1794. Caldwell's ambitions were however thwarted when the Admiralty appointed John Laforey to replace him after only a few months. Perceiving this second slight to be a consequence of the first, Caldwell returned to England at once and refused to serve at sea again even if the Admiralty, who had been unimpressed by his attitude, offered him employment, which they did not.

== Retirement ==
Retiring to his estates, Caldwell refused all further involvement in naval affairs, and his later promotion to full admiral in 1799 was a formality only. In consequence of the disagreement between Caldwell and the Admiralty, Caldwell was not conferred a knighthood in 1815 at the conclusion of hostilities, as were so many of his contemporaries, and it was not until 1820 that this was reversed, Caldwell being made a Knight Grand Cross of the Order of the Bath in early 1820. He died a few months later at his son Charles Andrew's estates near Basingstoke, survived by his wife.

== Notes ==
a. The updated version of the Oxford Dictionary of National Biography states that Caldwell became MP for Knocktopher in the Irish House of Commons between 1776 and the peace in 1783, and MP for Harristown until 1790. However he does not appear in the lists of MPs collected by E. M. Johnston-Liik. Benjamin's claimed tenure at Knocktopher coincides with that of his brother, Andrew, and may be the reason for some of the confusion.

== Citations ==
Military offices
Preceded by Sir John Jervis	Commander-in-Chief, Leeward Islands Station; 1794–1795	Succeeded by Sir John Laforey
