= François-Paul Brueys d'Aigalliers =

French Navy officer (1753–1798)

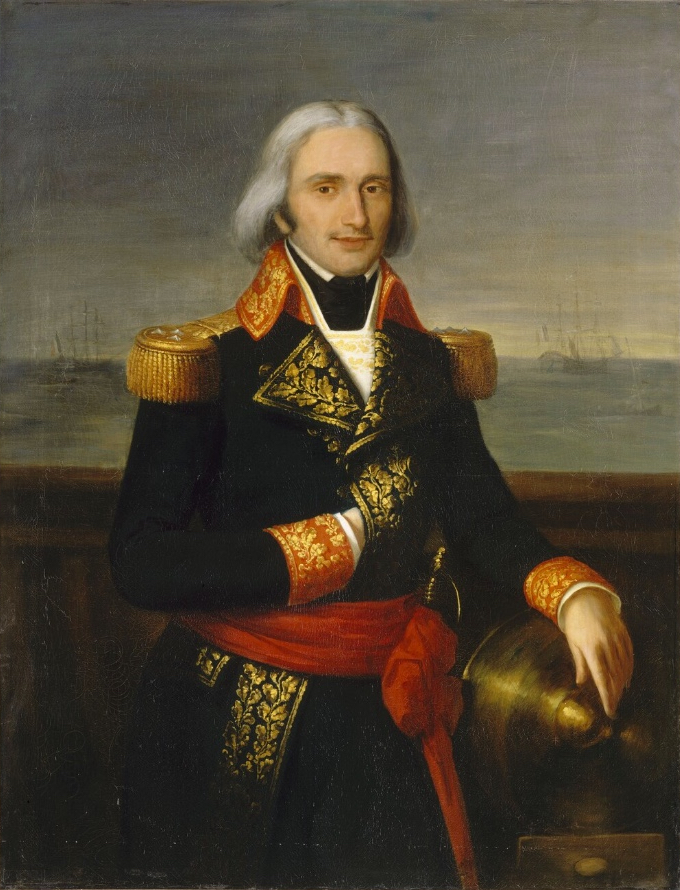
- Portrait of d'Aigalliers
- Born: 12 February 1753; Uzès, Languedoc
- Died: 1 August 1798 (aged 45); Abu Qir Bay, Egypt
- Military career
- Allegiance: Kingdom of France; French First Republic
- Branch: French Navy
- Service years: 1766–1798
- Rank: Vice admiral
- Units: Protecteur; Atalante; Terrible; Zélé; Vestale
- Commands: Chien de Chasse; Coureur; Barbeau; Poulette; Lys; Guillaume Tell; Orient
- Conflicts: American Revolutionary War; Battle of Martinique (1780); Battle of Fort Royal; Battle of the Chesapeake; Battle of Saint Kitts; French Revolutionary Wars; War of the First Coalition; French expedition to Sardinia; War of the Second Coalition; Mediterranean campaign of 1798; French invasion of Egypt and Syria; Battle of the Nile †

Vice-Admiral François-Paul Brueys d'Aigalliers, Comte de Brueys (11 February 1753 – 1 August 1798) was a French Navy officer who served in the American Revolutionary War and French Revolutionary Wars. He commanded the French fleet in the Mediterranean campaign of 1798 until his death at the Battle of the Nile.

== Early life and naval career ==
François-Paul Brueys d'Aigalliers was born on 11 February 1753 in Uzès, Languedoc into an aristocratic family. Joining the French Navy at the age of 13, he joined the crew of the 74-gun Protecteur as a volunteer in 1766 and served in several campaigns in the Levant. Becoming a Garde de la Marine in 1768, Brueys participated in the 1770 Tunis expedition on the 32-gun Atalante and went to Saint Domingue on board the 64-gun Actionnaire, though he was forced to leave the West Indies after contracting a tropical disease and returned to France, where Brueys served on shore establishments, mostly on France's southern coast.

Brueys was promoted to ship-of-the-line ensign in 1777 and again to ship-of-the-line lieutenant in April 1780, before serving on the 110-gun Terrible then the 74-gun Zélé in Admiral Luc Urbain du Bouëxic, comte de Guichen's squadron. He fought in the Battle of Martinique on 17 April along with two further engagements on 15 May and 19 May, along with the Battle of Fort Royal in late April 1781. Brueys was also present at the Battle of the Chesapeake in September 1781 and the Battle of Saint Kitts in February 1782. He then moved to the frigate Vestale, and was not present at the Battle of the Saintes. Brueys was made a Knight of the Order of Saint Louis at the end of the war.

Once peace was signed between Britain and France in 1783, Brueys was put in command of the aviso Chien de Chasse, serving for four years in the Antilles and off the American coast. In 1787, he was given command of another aviso, Coureur, which he cruised along the coasts of Latin America. Brueys proceeded to return to France, where he took command of the fluyt Barbeau before taking one year's leave between 1788 and 1789. In 1790, he was given command of the corvette Poulette. Brueys sailed her from Toulon to Algiers with the French consul general at the Regency of Algiers. Poulette also transported dispatches for the Levant Fleet and French consuls in the Levant.

== French Revolutionary Wars ==
Though several of Bruey's family members and friends were killed during the Reign of Terror for being aristocrats, he managed to avoid such a fate himself. He did not emigrate and was promoted to ship-of-the-line captain on 1 January 1792, before placed in command of the 74-gun Lys at Toulon (renamed Tricolore after the French monarchy was abolished). Brueys participated in several Italian operations under Vice-admiral Laurent Jean François Truguet, including the bombardment of Oneglia, operations in Naples led by Louis-René Levassor de Latouche Tréville and the failed French expedition to Sardinia.

During the siege of Toulon, the municipal authorities arrested Brueys and the National Convention issued a decree in September 1793 which stripped him of his rank due to being a noble. Truguet restored his rank in 1795 and he was promoted to counter admiral the following year. Brueys commanded French naval forces in the Adriatic Sea from 1796 to 1798, flying his flag in the 80-gun Guillaume Tell. He transported troops to the Ionian Islands and supported Napoleon's campaign in Italy by blockading Italy's coasts and keeping supply lines open to French troops.

== Egyptian campaign and death ==
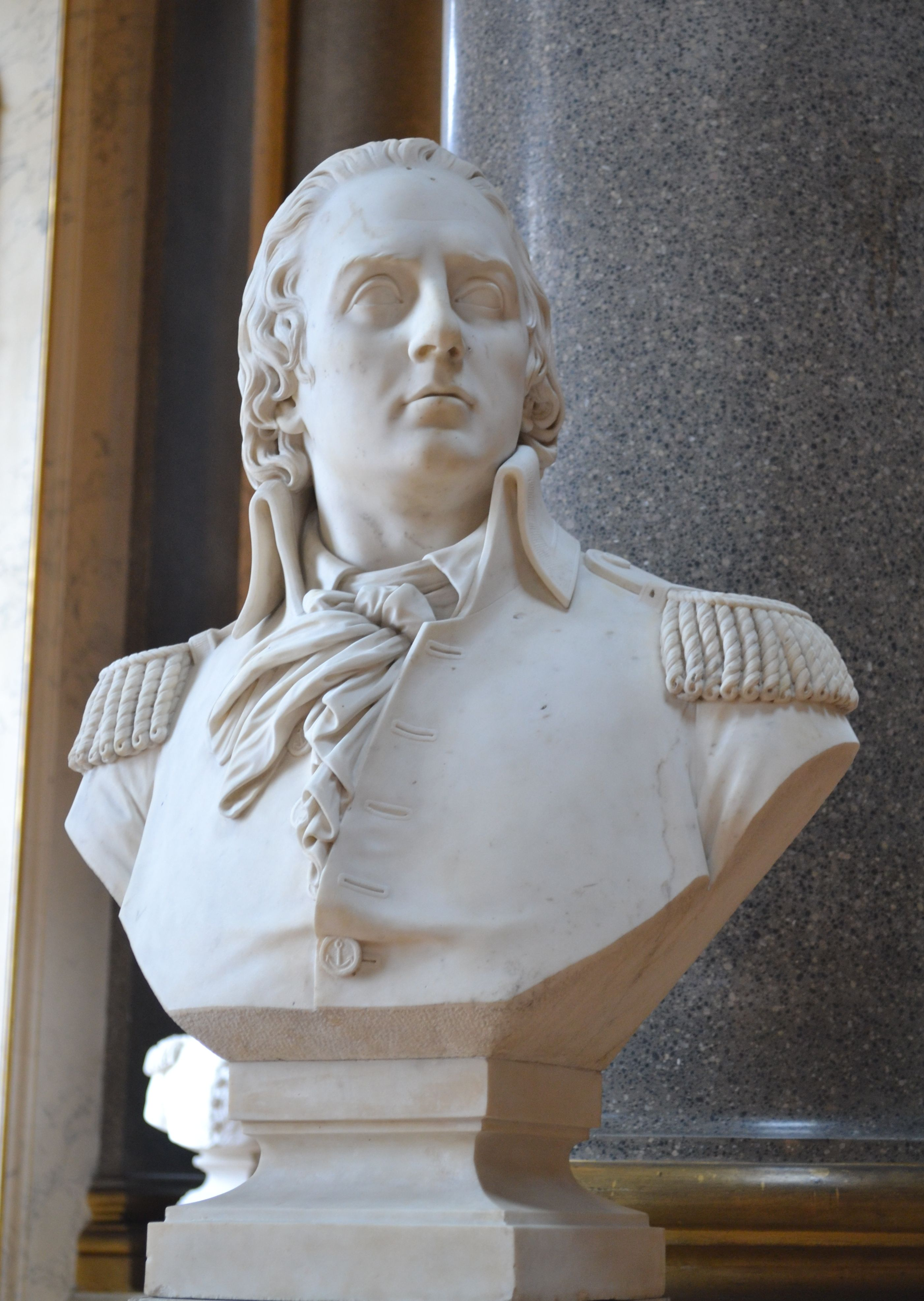
Bust of Brueys at the Galerie des Batailles

Napoleon noted Brueys's conduct in Italy and made him commander-in-chief of the fleet that would transport his army for the French invasion of Egypt and Syria; promoted to vice admiral in 1798, he flew his flag on the 118-gun Orient. The fleet set sail from Toulon on 19 May 1798, and Brueys evaded British attempts to intercept his fleet, reaching Hospitaller Malta and then on 1 July, Alexandria. As soon as Napoleon's troops were disembarked, he reportedly ordered Brueys either to anchor in Alexandria's port or to return to France, Malta or Corfu. Citing concerns that Alexandria's harbour was too shallow and difficult to enter for his fleet, and unwilling to leave Egypt until the French army secured a tenable foothold, Brueys instead opted to anchor in Abu Qir Bay to await the British.

Knowing the poor quality of his ships and crews, he preferred to guard a defensive position rather than go on the offensive and refused to weigh anchor when a British fleet under Rear-Admiral of the Blue Sir Horatio Nelson attacked his fleet on the evening of 1 August. In the ensuing Battle of the Nile, Orient duelled HMS Bellerophon, inflicting major damage on her but receiving little support, especially from the French rearguard under Denis Decrès and Pierre-Charles Villeneuve. Brueys was wounded twice during the battle before being almost cut in half by a British cannonball, dying at his command post around 9pm.

According to a British account, after the cannonball had taken off both his legs, he had himself strapped to an armchair on deck so that he could continue to direct the battle. Orient exploded one hour later after a fire on board reached her gunpowder stores. The resulting blast was seen from miles away and killed up to 800 of the ship's crew. Brueys was criticised in France for remaining at anchor right up until the moment of the British attack, but Napoleon replied to such criticism by saying "If, in this disastrous event, he made mistakes, he expiated them by his glorious end". Bruey's name appears on the southern pillar (23rd column) of the Arc de Triomphe in Paris.

== Bibliography ==
- Mullié, Charles (1852). "Brueys (François-Paul, comte de)" . Biographie des célébrités militaires des armées de terre et de mer de 1789 à 1850 (in French). Paris: Poignavant et Compagnie.
- Six, Georges (1934). "Brueys d'Aigalliers (François-Paul)". Dictionnaire biographique des généraux et amiraux français de la Révolution et de l'Empire: 1792–1814 (in French). Vol. 1. Paris: Librairie Historique et Nobilaire. pp. 163–164.
- (in French) Hubert Granier, Histoire des marins français 1789-1815, Marines éditions, Namtes 1998.
- (in French) Michèle Battesti, La bataille d'Aboukir, 1798: Nelson contrarie la stratégie de Bonaparte, Economica, Paris 1998.
