= French ship Commerce de Marseille (1785) =

Ship of the line of the French Navy

- Scale model of Achille, sister ship of French ship Commerce de Marseille (1785), on display at the Musée national de la Marine in Paris.

History

France
- Name: Commerce de Marseille
- Builder: Toulon shipyard
- Laid down: September 1784
- Launched: 7 October 1785
- Completed: September 1787
- Renamed: Lys (July 1786); Tricolore (October 1792)
- Captured: Handed over to the British on 29 August 1793
- Fate: Burnt on 18 December 1793

General characteristics
- Displacement: 3,069 tonneaux
- Tons burthen: 1,537 port tonneaux
- Length: 55.87 m (183 ft 4 in)
- Beam: 14.46 m (47 ft 5 in)
- Draught: 7.15 m (23.5 ft)
- Depth of hold: 7.15 m (23 ft 5 in)
- Sail plan: Full-rigged ship
- Crew: 705
- Armament: 74 guns: Lower gun deck: 28 × 36-pounder long guns; Upper gun deck: 30 × 18-pounder long guns; Forecastle and Quarterdeck: 12 × 8-pounder long guns, 10 × 36-pounder carronades

Commerce de Marseille was a 74-gun Téméraire-class ship of the line built for the French Navy during the 1780s. She was funded by a don des vaisseaux donation by merchants from Marseille. Completed in 1785, she played a minor role in the French Revolutionary Wars.

== Description ==
The Téméraire-class ships had a length of 55.87 metres (183 ft 4 in), a beam of 14.46 metres (47 ft 5 in) and a depth of hold of 7.15 metres (23 ft 5 in). The ships displaced 3,069 tonneaux and had a mean draught of 7.15 metres (23 ft 5 in). They had a tonnage of 1,537 port tonneaux. Their crew numbered 705 officers and ratings during wartime. They were fitted with three masts and ship rigged.

The muzzle-loading, smoothbore armament of the Téméraire class consisted of twenty-eight 36-pounder long guns on the lower gun deck, thirty 18-pounder long guns and thirty 18-pounder long guns on the upper gun deck. On the quarterdeck and forecastle were a total of a dozen 8-pounder long guns and ten 36-pounder carronades.

== Construction and career ==
Commerce de Marseille was ordered in 1784 and was laid down at the Arsenal de Toulon in October. She was launched on 17 October 1785. The ship was named on 27 January 1786 and then renamed Lys on 19 July. She was completed in September 1787.

She was renamed Tricolore on 6 October 1792. She was one of the ships in Toulon when the city was surrendered to a British force under Admiral Lord Hood in August 1793. Tricolore was subsequently burned by the British in their withdrawal from the port in December that year.

== Bibliography ==
- Roche, Jean-Michel (2005). Dictionnaire des bâtiments de la flotte de guerre française de Colbert à nos jours [Dictionary of French Warships from Colbert to Today]. Vol. 1: 1671-1870. Roche. ISBN 978-2-9525917-0-6. OCLC 165892922.
- Winfield, Rif and Roberts, Stephen S. (2015) French Warships in the Age of Sail 1786-1861: Design, Construction, Careers and Fates. Seaforth Publishing. ISBN 978-1-84832-204-2
