= HMS Defence (1763) =

74-gun third-rate ship of the line of the Royal Navy

Coordinates: 56.3583°N 8.1°E

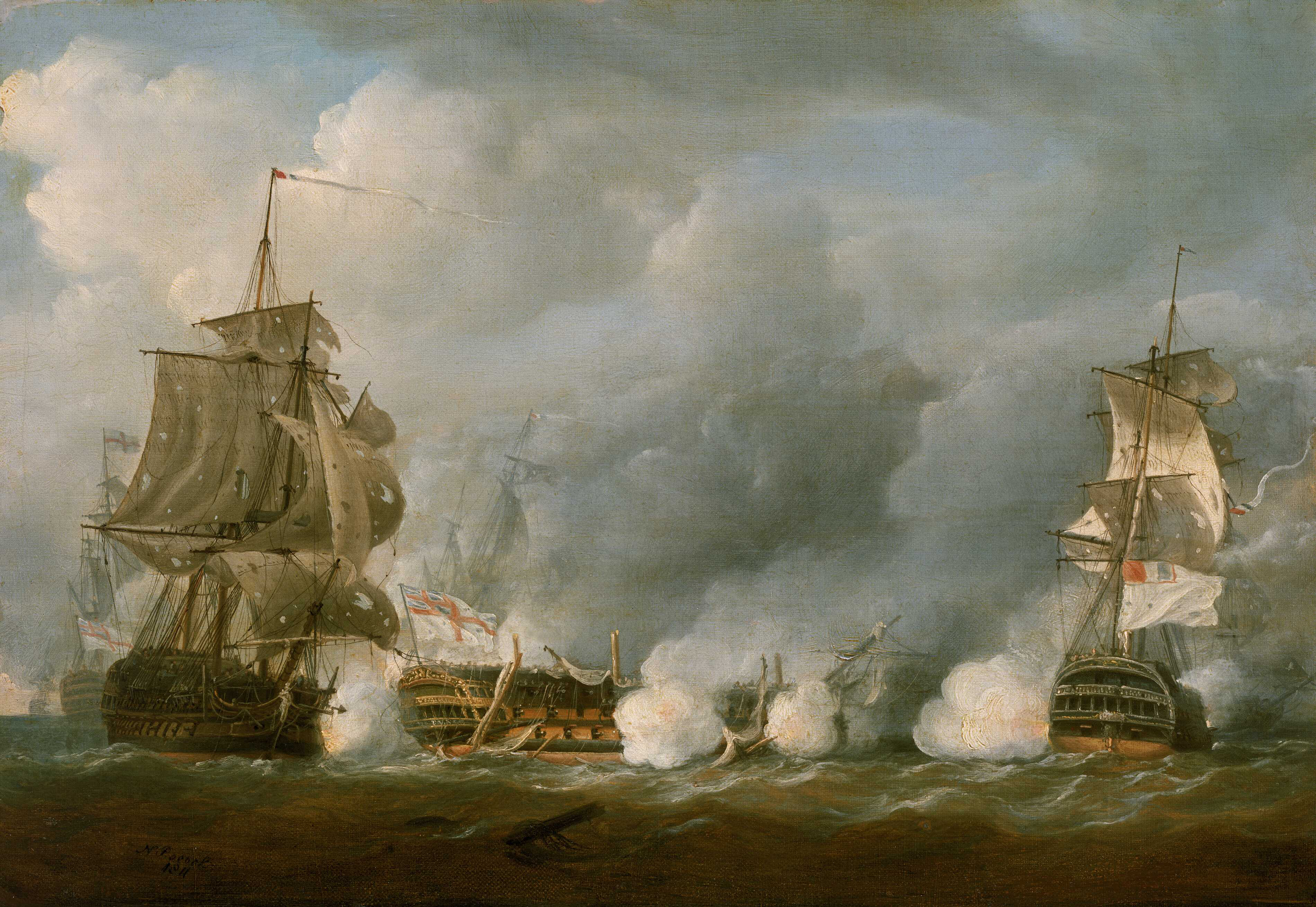
- Defence (centre) at the Glorious First of June

History

Great Britain
- Name: HMS Defence
- Ordered: 15 December 1758
- Builder: Israel Pownoll, Plymouth Dockyard
- Launched: 31 March 1763
- Fate: Wrecked, 24 December 1811
- Notes: Participated in: Battle of Cape St Vincent; Battle of Cuddalore; Glorious First of June; Battle of the Nile; Battle of Trafalgar

General characteristics
- Class & type: Bellona-class ship of the line
- Tons burthen: 1,6038/94 (bm)
- Length: 168 ft (51.2 m) (gundeck)
- Beam: 46 ft 9 in (14.2 m)
- Draught: 21 ft 6 in (6.6 m)
- Depth of hold: 19 ft 9 in (6.0 m)
- Sail plan: Full-rigged ship
- Armament: Gundeck: 28 × 32-pounder guns; Upper gundeck: 28 × 18-pounder guns; QD: 14 × 9-pounder guns; Fc: 4 × 9-pounder guns

HMS Defence was a 74-gun Bellona-class third-rate ship of the line of the Royal Navy, built by Israel Pownoll and launched on 31 March 1763 at Plymouth Dockyard. She was one of the most famous ships of the period, taking part in several of the most important naval battles of the French Revolutionary and Napoleonic Wars. In 1811 she was wrecked off the coast of Jutland with the loss of almost her entire crew.

== Career ==
During the American War of Independence, Defence served with the Channel Fleet, seeing action at the Battle of Cape St. Vincent in 1780. She was sent out to India in early 1782 as part of a squadron of five ships under Commodore Sir Richard Bickerton, arriving too late for the battles of that year. But in 1783 she took part in the last battle of the war, at Cuddalore. She returned to England at the end of 1785. She was then laid up during the years of peace until the outbreak of the French Revolutionary Wars.

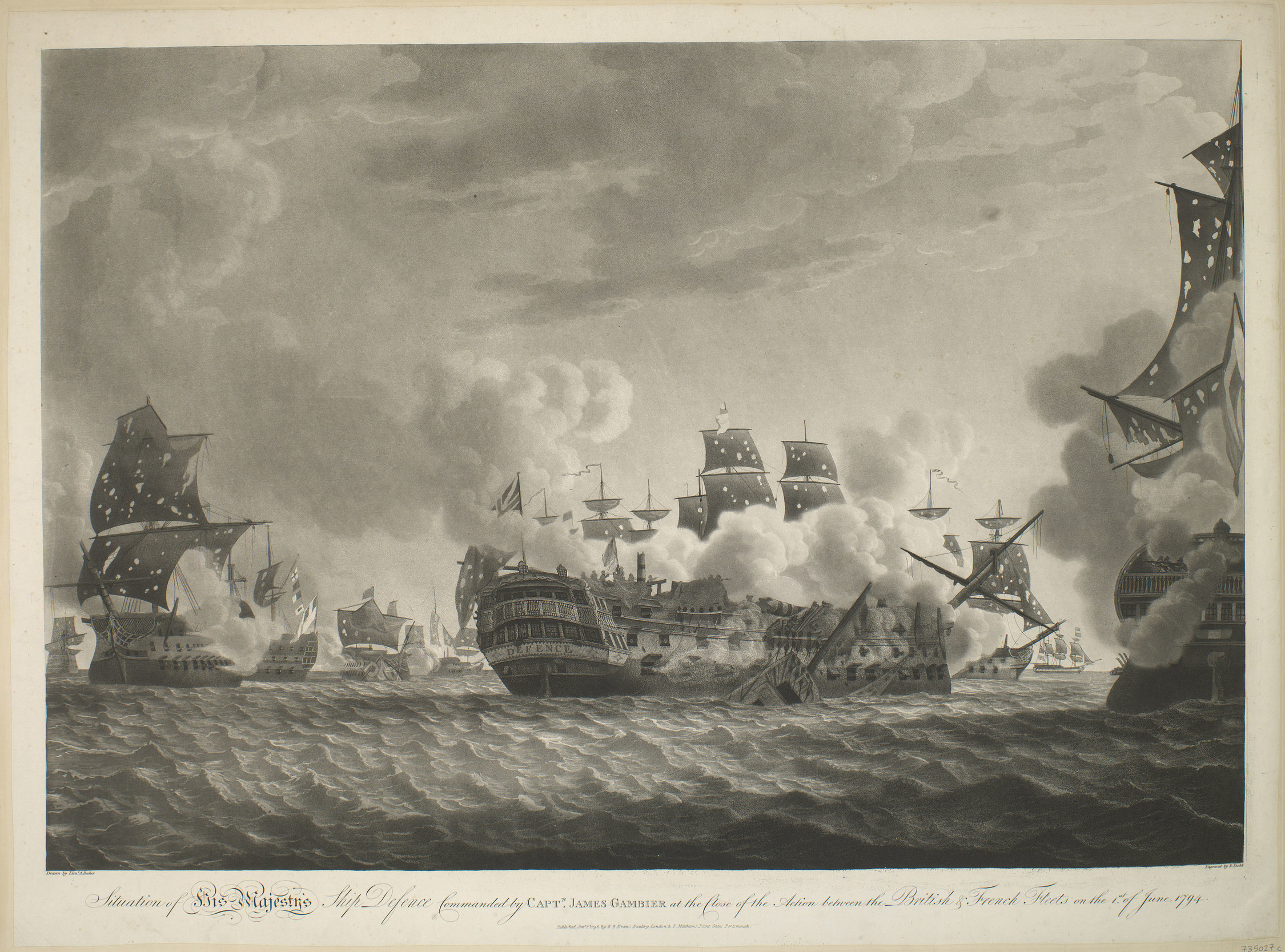
Situation of the Defence at the close of the action on 1 June 1794, by Robert Dodd after Lieut. A. Becher RN.

Recommissioned into the Channel Fleet under Captain James Gambier, she fought at the Glorious First of June in 1794, distinguishing herself in action against Mucius and Tourville, and becoming one of only two British ships to be completely dismasted in the battle. After repairs, she was sent to the Mediterranean, joining Admiral William Hotham in time to take part in the Battle of Hyeres in July.

Defence was at Plymouth on 20 January 1795 and so shared in the proceeds of the detention of the Dutch naval vessels, East Indiamen, and other merchant vessels that were in port on the outbreak of war between Britain and the Netherlands.

In 1798 she returned to the Mediterranean under Captain John Peyton, taking part in the Battle of the Nile in August.

On 1 July 1800, Defence, Fisgard, Renown and the hired armed cutter Lord Nelson were in Bourneuf Bay when they sent in their boats to attack a French convoy at Île de Noirmoutier. The British destroyed the Thérèse (of 20 guns), a lugger (12 guns), two schooners (6 guns each) and a cutter (6 guns), of unknown names. The cutting out party also burned some 15 merchant vessels loaded with corn and supplies for the French fleet at Brest. However, in this enterprise, 92 officers and men out of the entire party of 192 men, fell prisoners to the French when their boats became stranded. Lord Nelson had contributed no men to the attacking force and so had no casualties. (Note: She did share in the head money with an able seaman receiving 3s 11 3/4d, and her commander receiving £6 8s 7 1/2d, in 1825.)

In 1801, Defence sailed to the Baltic under Captain Lord Henry Paulet with Admiral Hyde Parker's fleet. She was present at the Battle of Copenhagen, but did not see action as she was part of the reserve under Parker.

On 11 February, 1805 she made contact with USS Constitution off Portugal 36.44 North.

The Morning After Trafalgar by Clarkson Stanfield, depicts the captured San Ildefonso.

In 1805 she saw action again at the Battle of Trafalgar, where under Captain George Johnstone Hope, she captured the San Ildefonso and fought the Berwick, suffering 36 casualties.

Defence was one of the British ships in support of the 1809 Walcheren Campaign which was intended to capture Vlissingen (Flushing) and Antwerp in the Netherlands.

== Loss ==
She ran aground on 24 December 1811 off the west coast of Jutland, Denmark. She was under the command of Captain D. Atkins and in the company of St George, under Rear-Admiral Robert Carthew Reynolds, and Cressy, when a hurricane and heavy seas came up. St George was jury-rigged and so Atkins refused to leave her without the admiral's permission. As a result, both were wrecked near Ringkøbing. Cressy did not ask for permission and so avoided wrecking.

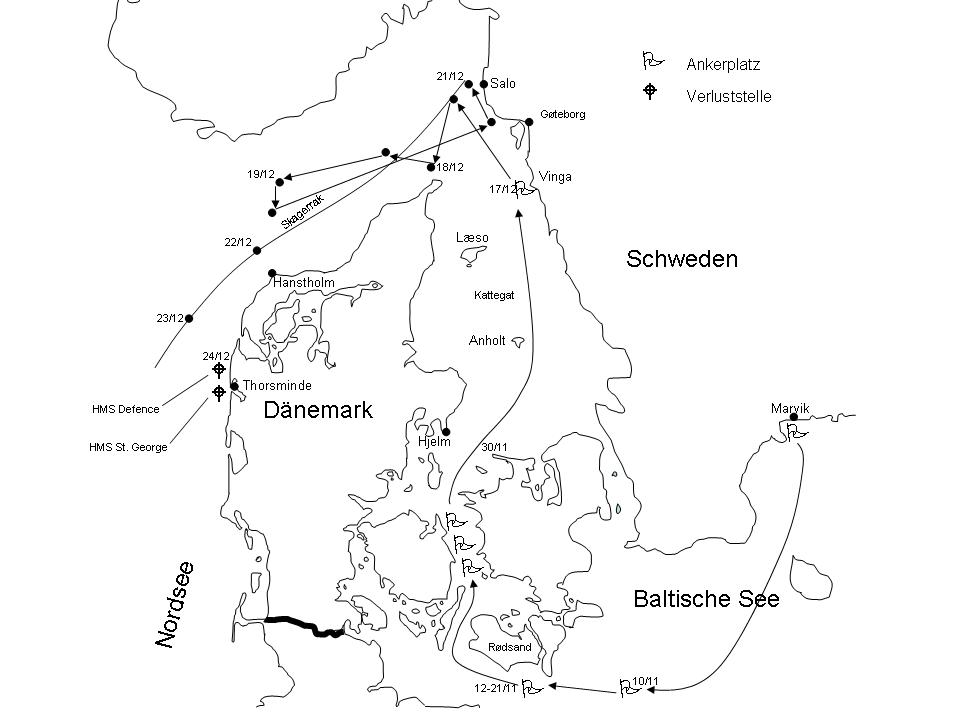
The last cruise

Defence lost all but 14 of her crew of 597 men and boys, including her captain. St George too lost almost her entire crew, including the admiral. Most of the bodies that came ashore were buried in the sand dunes of Thorsminde, which have been known ever since as "Dead Mens Dunes." The Danish authorities quickly ordered Lieutenant Wigelsen, the Receiver of Wreck, to the area.

== Captain Atkins and his culpability for the loss ==
Captain David Atkins is first noted as a midshipman under Captain Erasmus Gower in HMS Edgar in 1780–81. For two years commencing in 1792, he was 3rd lieutenant with Gower in HMS Lion under Gower. John Barrow later claimed Atkins while on Lion was a navigator, "showing skill in lunar observations way beyond his years". He followed Gower onto HMS Triumph and was first lieutenant on Triumph from 1794. He was promoted captain in 1798; in 1801, he was promoted to captain; and thence to flag captain to Gower on Princess Royal. In 1805 HMS Seine was captained by him. In 1809, he commanded Defence in the Walcheren Expedition.

Accounting for blame for the loss is conflicted. Some say he followed HMS St George onto the reef. As published by Brenton 3 Brenton (1837) Naval History of Great Britain the St George, bearing the flag of Rear-Admiral Robert Carthew Reynolds, ran ashore. Ostensibly, when told of this, Atkins asked whether the admiral had made the signal giving him leave to part company. Hearing a denial, Atkins said: "I will never desert my Admiral in the hour of danger and distress." Defence ran aground and was overcome by a breaking sea. The breakup led to loss of 593 men, her full complement being 597. One of the survivors said that "At half-past twelve the captain told Mr. Baker he would not wear till the St. George did, but would stay by her."

On the other hand, the Annual Register (Vol 54), however, states that "HMS Defence was the first ship to run aground and that HMS St George (flagship) immediately let go its anchor but that the ship swung around on her cable and also went aground as a result." This account was corroborated by an account printed in Gentleman's Magazine in 1812. In the incident, "HMS St George was also destroyed, with the loss of 838 lives, including Reynolds." Given the fog of war and passage of time, this historical debate may never be conclusively resolved.

Atkins' body was buried with full Military honours by the Danes.
