= The Nelson Touch =

Leadership and tactical style of Horatio Nelson

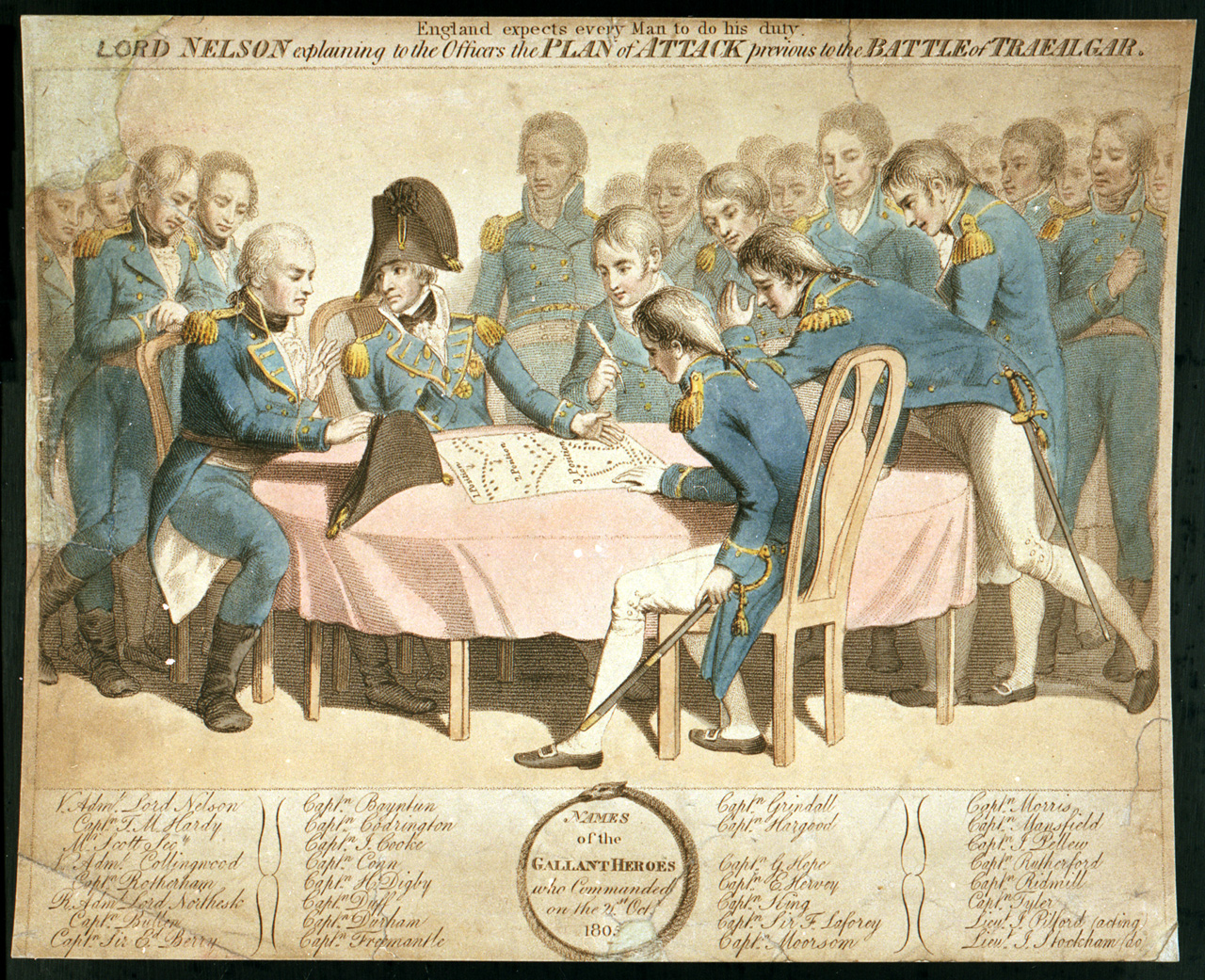
Nelson explaining his battle plan to his officers prior to the Battle of Trafalgar

While on shore leave in England during the summer of 1805, the Royal Navy officer Horatio Nelson told his friend Henry Addington about his ideas for his next sea battle. This collection of ideas he dubbed the Nelson Touch. After Nelson's death, the phrase took on a broader meaning relating to his leadership style.

== Origins of the phrase ==
Horatio Nelson used the expression "the Nelson touch" on more than one occasion, and its origin has been the subject of debate amongst historians. A favourite suggestion is that it derives from a line in Nelson's favourite play, Henry V: "a little touch of Harry in the night" describing how the king would calm his soldiers on the eve of battle. This explanation seems particularly pertinent to the phrase when used to describe Nelson's leadership style. Nelson also wrote in a private letter to Lady Emma Hamilton about "The Nelson touch, which we say is warranted never to fail". In this context it is easy to see why some have seen it as a private sexual joke between the two (a little touch of Nelson in the night).

== Nelson's tactics ==
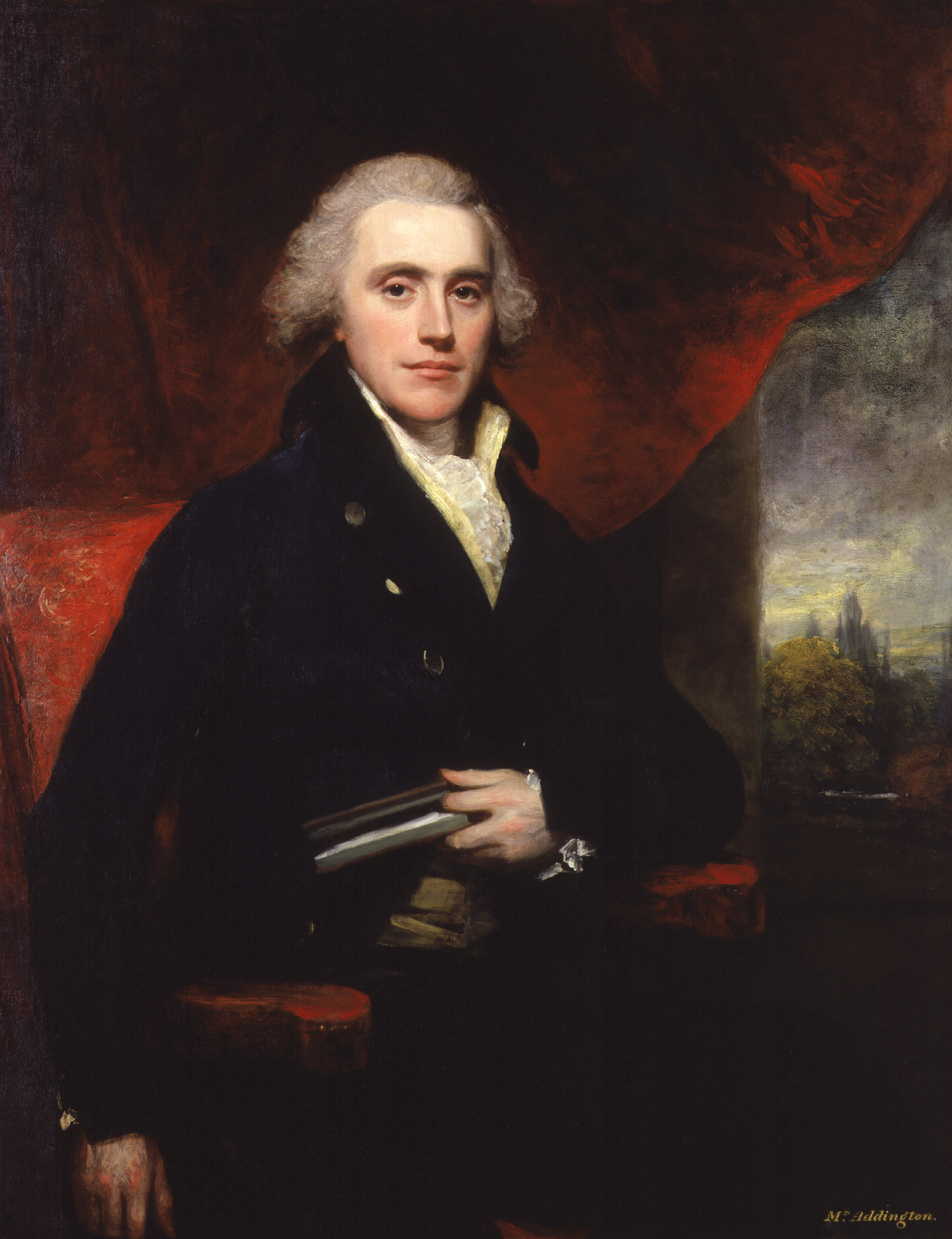
Henry Addington, to whom Nelson explained "the Nelson touch"

Traditionally a sea battle would be fought with the two opposing fleets drawing themselves up to form two lines of battle. This tactic did not favour what was perceived to be the faster, more accurate gunnery of the Royal Navy and would often bring about indecisive results, usually with the enemy escaping. Nelson's idea was to quickly bring about a melee in which, due to superior gunnery, the British would have a distinct advantage. While on shore leave, in August 1805, Nelson told his friend Henry Addington about his ideas for his next sea battle. This collection of ideas he dubbed "the Nelson Touch". Nelson planned to divide his fleet into three sections.^{[a]} The largest part would engage closely with one section of the enemy's fleet crushing it with greater numbers. The other ships, sailing in two columns, would cut the enemy line and prevent them from coming to the aid of their comrades. The enemy fleet could then be destroyed piecemeal.

There is a tendency amongst some historians to attribute these tactics to Nelson alone. There was nothing new in his ideas however: breaking the enemy line had previously been achieved by, amongst others, Admiral George Rodney at the Battle of the Saintes (1782); Admiral Adam Duncan had divided his fleet at the Battle of Camperdown (1797). Concentration on one part of the enemy fleet was a very old tactic and had already been used by Nelson at the Battle of the Nile in 1798.

Nelson was innovative in one respect at least: rather than direct the battle as it was occurring, through the use of signals, he would gather his captains together prior to action and tell them his plan but would allow them great leeway in how they carried out their individual orders. In any event, conveying signals in this type of battle would have been difficult. The ease with which signals could be passed from one ship to the next was one advantage of fighting in a line of battle. Nelson also had his fleet cruise in the same order that they would go into battle. Nelson was at Battle of the Hyères Islands when Admiral William Hotham allowed the French fleet to escape while he wasted time getting his ships in order.

== Nelson's leadership ==
Nelson's talent for leadership and the way he fostered admiration and trust in his fellow officers was later also to become known as the "Nelson Touch"; although Nelson never referred to it as such himself. He often spoke however, of his captains as his "band of brothers" and "we happy few", both references from Henry V. In the play, Shakespeare portrays the King as someone who was loved by, and an inspiration to, his men, and it seems that Nelson aspired to be like him. Emma Hamilton even called Nelson "Henry" a number of times in her letters to him. Creating trust amongst his officers was crucial to Nelson. It allowed him to rely on simple strategies rather than complicated battle plans, certain in the knowledge that his subordinates would support one another in achieving the overall objective and be confident enough to use their own initiative when required.

== Notes ==
a. Nelson's next battle was to be 'Trafalgar' but for whatever reason, probably numerical, Nelson chose to divide his fleet into two.
