= Battle of Genoa order of battle =

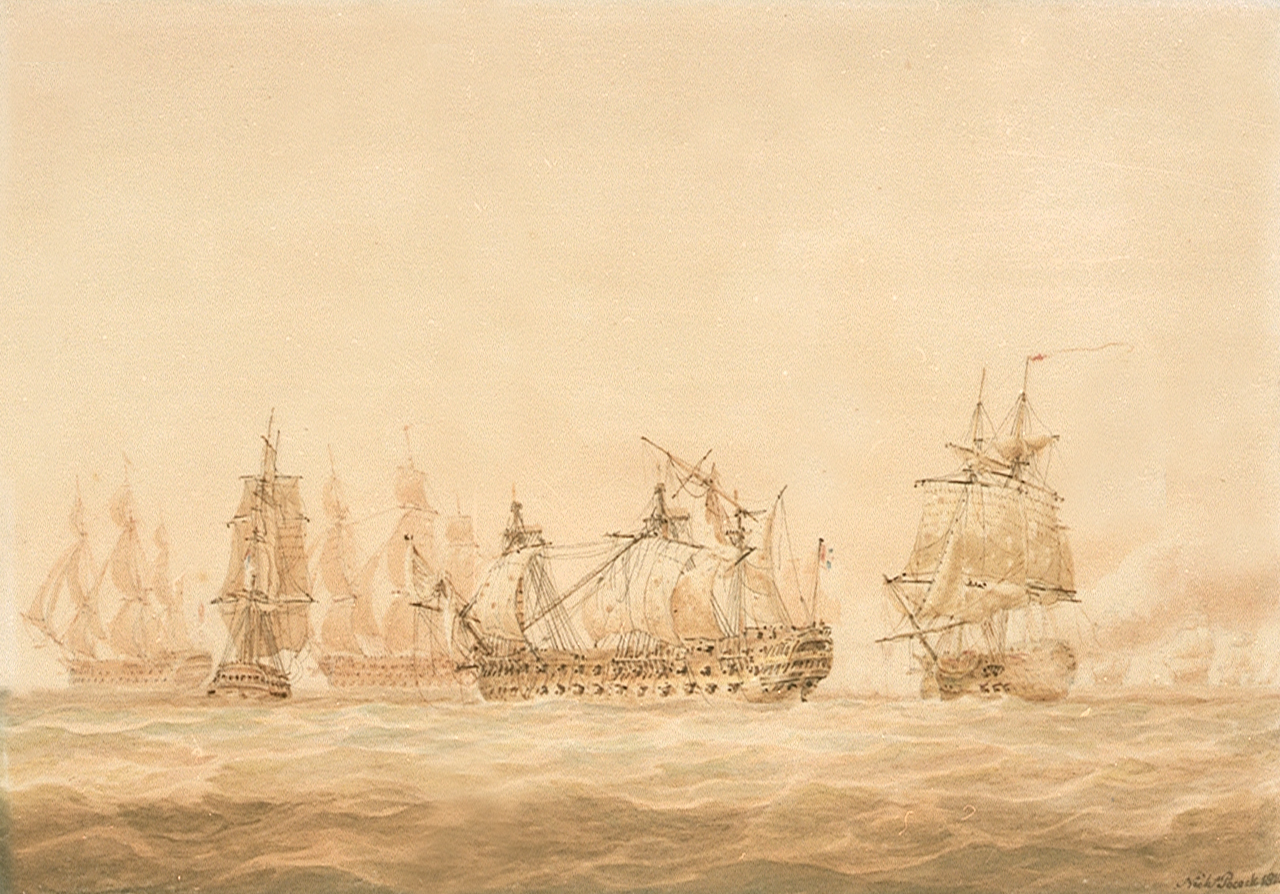
1810 illustration of the Battle of Genoa

In 1795, the British-Neapolitan and French navies participated in a short campaign in the Gulf of Genoa during the French Revolutionary Wars. The campaign featured the principal Battle of Genoa on 13–14 March 1795, and the earlier action of 8 March 1795 off Cap Corse. Losses were even: although the British succeeded in capturing two French ships in the main action, two British ships were also lost elsewhere during the campaign. The French foray into the Ligurian Sea was driven back to a safe harbour, resulting in a restoration of the British blockade of Toulon, and leading to a second battle later in the year.

The campaign began on 3 March when the French Mediterranean Fleet sailed from the naval base at Toulon for an operation in the Ligurian Sea. During the winter they had been under constant blockade from a British fleet based at San Fiorenzo on Corsica, which had been captured in a British invasion the previous year. In February the British fleet, under the command of Vice-Admiral William Hotham, had sailed from San Fiorenzo to Leghorn for repairs, leaving behind HMS Berwick, damaged in a January storm. When news of Hotham's withdrawal reached Toulon, Contre-amiral Pierre Martin sailed the French fleet out and caught Berwick off the northern coast of Corsica. The damaged ship was unable to outrun pursuit and surrendered at the action of 8 March 1795 after the captain was decapitated by French shot.

Hotham discovered Martin's movements and sailed to meet him, encountering the French near Cape Noli on 10 March. For several days both fleets lay becalmed, unable to come to action. On 13 March the wind increased and Hotham attacked, Martin falling back under pursuit. One of Martin's rearguard, Ça Ira, collided with another ship and fell back. Ça Ira was engaged by first the frigate HMS Inconstant and then HMS Agamemnon under Captain Horatio Nelson. Elsewhere there was scattered fighting between other British and French ships. Over night the French flagship accidentally detached from the fleet, and in the morning Hotham renewed the attack, overwhelming Ça Ira and the Censeur, sent to support it. A French counterattack was beaten off, although HMS Illustrious and HMS Courageux were badly damaged.

Hotham declined to renew the action due to concern for his damaged ships, to the frustration of his subordinates, particularly Nelson. The French withdrew to Gourjean Bay and then Toulon, and the British to the Gulf of La Spezia. There a storm drove the damaged Illustrious ashore, and the ship was destroyed. In the aftermath both fleets refitted and prepared for another engagement; in early July the French fleet was again attacked by the British, at the Battle of the Hyères Islands, and the rearmost ship Alcide was overrun and destroyed.

== Hotham's fleet ==
Note that as carronades were not traditionally taken into consideration when calculating a ship's rate, these ships may have been carrying more guns than indicated below. Officers killed in action are marked with a † symbol.

- British Royal Navy
- Navy of the Kingdom of Naples
- Ships in this colour were destroyed or captured during the campaign

Vice-Admiral William Hotham's fleet
Ship	Rate	Guns	Fleet	Commander	Casualties			Notes
Ship	Rate	Guns	Fleet	Commander	Killed	Wounded	Total	Notes
Van squadron
HMS Captain	Third rate	74	Royal Navy	Captain Samuel Reeve	3	19	22	Heavily engaged 13 March, damaged.
HMS Bedford	Third rate	74	Royal Navy	Captain Davidge Gould	7	18	25	Heavily engaged 13 March, badly damaged.
Tancredi	Third rate	74	Kingdom of Naples	Captain Chevalier Francesco Caracciolo	1	5	6	
HMS Princess Royal	Second rate	98	Royal Navy	Vice-Admiral Samuel Goodall; Captain John Child Purvis	3	8	11	Engaged 14 March.
HMS Agamemnon	Third rate	64	Royal Navy	Captain Horatio Nelson	0	13	13	Heavily engaged 13 and 14 March.
Minerva	Fifth rate	32	Kingdom of Naples		0	4	4	Heavily engaged 13 March.
Pilade	Fifth rate		Kingdom of Naples		0	0	0	
HMS Lowestoffe	Fifth rate	32	Royal Navy	Captain Benjamin Hallowell	0	0	0	Heavily engaged 14 March, damaged.
HMS Poulette	Sixth rate	26	Royal Navy	Commander Ralph Willett Miller	0	0	0	
HMS Tarleton	Brig	14	Royal Navy	Commander Charles Brisbane	0	0	0	
Centre squadron
HMS Illustrious	Third rate	74	Royal Navy	Captain Thomas Frederick	20	70	90	Heavily engaged 14 March, badly damaged. Lost main and mizzenmasts. Wrecked on the Italian coast, 17 March.
HMS Courageux	Third rate	74	Royal Navy	Captain Augustus Montgomery	15	33	48	Heavily engaged 14 March, badly damaged. Lost main and mizzenmasts.
HMS Britannia	First rate	100	Royal Navy	Vice-Admiral William Hotham; Captain John Holloway	1	18	19	
HMS Egmont	Third rate	74	Royal Navy	Captain John Sutton	7	21	28	Heavily engaged 13 March, damaged.
HMS Windsor Castle	Second rate	98	Royal Navy	Rear-Admiral Robert Linzee; Captain John Gore	6	31	37	
HMS Inconstant	Fifth rate	36	Royal Navy	Captain Thomas Fremantle	3	14	17	Heavily engaged 13 March, damaged.
HMS Meleager	Fifth rate	32	Royal Navy	Captain George Cockburn	0	0	0	
Rear squadron
HMS Diadem	Third rate	64	Royal Navy	Captain Charles Tyler	3	7	10	
HMS St George	Second rate	98	Royal Navy	Vice-Admiral Sir Hyde Parker; Captain Thomas Foley	4	13	17	
HMS Terrible	Third rate	74	Royal Navy	Captain George Campbell	0	6	6	
HMS Fortitude	Third rate	74	Royal Navy	Captain William Young	1	4	5	
HMS Romulus	Fifth rate	36	Royal Navy	Captain George Hope	0	0	0	
HMS Moselle	Brig	18	Royal Navy	Commander Charles Dudley Pater	0	0	0	
Fox	Cutter	14	Royal Navy	Lieutenant John Gibson	0	0	0	
Total casualties: 74 killed, 254 wounded
Sources: James, p. 261; Clowes, p. 272.

HMS Berwick
Ship	Rate	Guns	Fleet	Commander	Casualties			Notes
Ship	Rate	Guns	Fleet	Commander	Killed	Wounded	Total	Notes
HMS Berwick	Third rate	74	Royal Navy	Captain Adam Littlejohn †	1	4	5	Defeated and captured at Action of 8 March 1795 while sailing independently off Cap Corse.
Sources: James, p. 255.

== Martin's fleet ==
Note that the number of guns refers to the official complement, traditionally taken into consideration when calculating a ship's rate, and that these ships may have been carrying more guns than indicated below, although obusiers were not carried on French ships in this battle, Officers killed in action are marked with a † symbol.

- Ships in this colour were destroyed or captured during the campaign

Contre-amiral Martin's fleet
Ship	Rate	Guns	Fleet	Commander	Casualties			Notes
Ship	Rate	Guns	Fleet	Commander	Killed	Wounded	Total	Notes
Sans Culotte	First rate	120	French Navy	Contre-amiral Pierre Martin; Captain Lapalisse; Représentant Letourneur	Unknown			Engaged 13 March. Martin and Letourneur transferred to frigate Friponne in evening. Ship subsequently detached from fleet and anchored at Genoa.
Duquesne	Third rate	74	French Navy	Captain Zacharie Allemand	Unknown			Heavily engaged 14 March. Damaged.
Victoire	Third rate	80	French Navy	Captain Daniel Savary	Unknown			Heavily engaged 13 March. Damaged.
Tonnant	Third rate	80	French Navy	Captain Julien Cosmao-Kerjulien	Unknown			Heavily engaged 14 March. Damaged.
Ça Ira	Third rate	80	French Navy	Captain Louis-Marie Coudé	c.400			Heavily engaged 13 and 14 March. Badly damaged and captured. Later became HMS Ca Ira.
Mercure	Third rate	74	French Navy	Captain Catteford	0	0	0	Damaged in storm 12 March and detached from fleet. Did not participate in the battle.
Censeur	Third rate	74	French Navy	Captain Pierre Benoît	c.350			Heavily engaged 14 March. Badly damaged and captured. Later became HMS Censeur.
Alcide	Third rate	74	French Navy	Captain Leblond Saint-Hylaire	Unknown			
Barra	Third rate	74	French Navy	Captain André Maureau	Unknown			Engaged 13 March
Conquérant	Third rate	74	French Navy	Captain Lemancq	Unknown			
Généreux	Third rate	74	French Navy	Captain Louis	Unknown			
Guerrier	Third rate	74	French Navy	Captain Louis Infernet	Unknown			
Heureux	Third rate	74	French Navy	Captain Charles Lacaille	Unknown			
Peuple Souverain	Third rate	74	French Navy	Captain Charbonnier	Unknown			
Timoléon	Third rate	74	French Navy	Captain Joseph Khrom	Unknown			Heavily engaged 14 March. Damaged
Vestale	Frigate	36	French Navy	Lieutenant Foucaud	Unknown			Engaged 13 March.
Minerve	Frigate	40	French Navy	Lieutenant Delorme	-	-	-	
Alceste	Frigate	32	French Navy		-	-	-	Heavily engaged in action with Berwick on 8 March. Badly damaged and withdrew from fleet.
Artémise	Frigate	32	French Navy	Lieutenant Decasse	-	-	-	
Courageuse	Frigate		French Navy		-	-	-	
Friponne	Frigate		French Navy	Captain Louis-Léonce Trullet; Contre-amiral Pierre Martin (after 13 March)	-	-	-	
Alerte	Brig	10	French Navy		-	-	-	
Hazard	Brig	18	French Navy	Lieutenant Amand Leduc	-	-	-	
Scout	Brig	18	French Navy	Ensign Charabot	-	-	-	
Total casualties: 400–750
Sources: Troude, p. 424; James, p. 261; Clowes, p. 272.

== Notes ==
1. Note A: French casualties in the battle are uncertain. William James records a figure of 400 killed and wounded on Ça Ira and Censeur alone, and notes that further losses on the French ships were inevitable but unknowable. His figures are supported by William Laird Clowes. In his biography of Nelson, Geoffrey Bennett records a total of 750 casualties on the captured ships, a figure presumably drawn from Ernle Bradford's estimate of 400 on Ça Ira and 350 on Censeur. Digby Smith's book on Napoleonic statistics, apparently drawing on James and Clowes, lists much higher figures of 600 killed and 1,000 wounded. This may come from French histories; Onésime-Joachim Troude reports 600 French sailors as killed in the battle.

== Bibliography ==
- Bennett, Geoffrey (2002) [1972]. Nelson the Commander. London: Penguin. ISBN 0-141391-29-4.
- Bradford, Ernle (1999) [1977]. Nelson: The Essential Hero. Ware: Wordsworth Military Library. ISBN 1-84022-202-6.
- Clowes, William Laird (1997) [1900]. The Royal Navy, A History from the Earliest Times to 1900, Volume III. London: Chatham Publishing. ISBN 1-86176-012-4.
- Forester, C. S. (2001) [1929]. Nelson. London: Chatham Publishing. ISBN 1-86176-178-3.
- Gardiner, Robert, ed. (2001) [1996]. Fleet Battle and Blockade. London: Caxton Editions. ISBN 1-84067-363-X.
- Grocott, Terence (2002) [1997]. Shipwrecks of the Revolutionary & Napoleonic Era. Caxton Editions. ISBN 1-84067-164-5.
- Ireland, Bernard (2005). The Fall of Toulon: The Last Opportunity the Defeat the French Revolution. Cassell. ISBN 0-3043-6726-5.
- James, William (2002) [1827]. The Naval History of Great Britain, Volume 1, 1793–1796. London: Conway Maritime Press. ISBN 0-85177-905-0.
- Mostert, Noel (2007). The Line upon a Wind: The Greatest War Fought at Sea Under Sail 1793 – 1815. Vintage Books. ISBN 9-78071-260-9272.
- Roche, Jean-Michel (2005). Dictionnaire des bâtiments de la flotte de guerre française de Colbert à nos jours. Vol. 1. Group Retozel-Maury Millau. ISBN 978-2-9525917-0-6. OCLC 165892922. (1671-1870)
- Smith, Digby (1998). The Napoleonic Wars Data Book. Greenhill Books. ISBN 1-85367-276-9. OCLC 231766509.
- Troude, Onésime-Joachim (1867). Batailles navales de la France (in French). Vol. 2. Challamel ainé. pp. 424–431.
