= Battle of Genoa (1795) =

1795 battle of the Mediterranean campaign of 1793–1796

Coordinates: 44°02′N 08°28′E

- Part of the Mediterranean campaign of 1793–1796
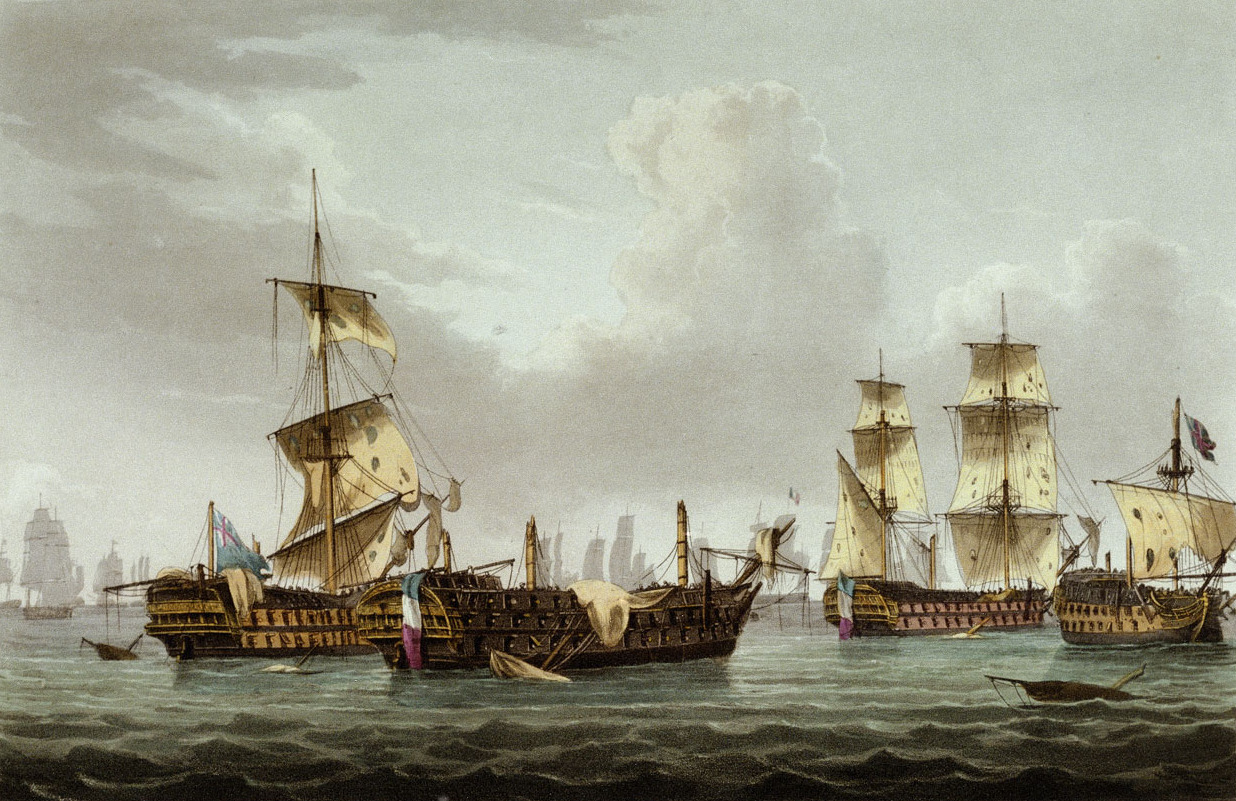
- 1816 engraving of the battle
Date	13–14 March 1795
Location	Gulf of Genoa, Ligurian Sea
Result	Anglo-Neapolitan victory

Belligerents
Great Britain; Naples	France

Commanders and leaders
William Hotham	Pierre Martin

Strength
14 ships of the line (OOB)	13 ships of the line (OOB)

Casualties and losses
74 killed 254 wounded	400–750 killed or wounded 2 ships of the line captured

The Battle of Genoa (also known as the Battle of Cape Noli and in French as Bataille de Gênes) was a fleet action fought between an Anglo-Neapolitan fleet and a French fleet on 13-14 March 1795 in the Gulf of Genoa during the Mediterranean campaign of 1793–1796. The French fleet was led by Counter-admiral Pierre Martin and comprised 13 ships of the line while the Anglo-Neapolitan fleet fleet, under Vice-Admiral of the Red William Hotham mustered 13 ships of the line. The battle ended with a minor Anglo-Neapolitan victory and the capture of two French ships of the line.

The battle was part of a naval campaign in the spring of 1795, during which Martin sought to assert French control over the waters off Southern France. These had been effectively ceded to the British 18 months earlier when the British captured the French Mediterranean naval base of Toulon. Although it was recaptured at an ensuing siege, much of the French Navy's Mediterranean Squadron had been burned in the harbour by Anglo-Spanish boarding parties. Only half the Mediterranean Squadron was salvageable and as repairs continued in Toulon, the British used their dominance to invade and capture the island of Corsica in 1794. By the start of 1795 enough French ships were in fighting condition that Martin felt able to make limited cruises in the Ligurian Sea. At the start of March 1795 he sailed for Genoa, encountering and capturing a British ship of the line en route. Off Genoa Martin found himself pursued by Hotham's fleet and, after two days of manoeuvres in calm weather, turned back towards the French coast.

Hotham pursued, and on 13 March his leading ships caught the French rearguard. For two days Martin's rearmost ships fought a series of running engagements with the British fleet in which several ships from both sides were badly damaged. Martin's flagship the 120-gun Sans Culotte lost contact with the battle overnight, and after a brief resumption of the battle the following morning he gave orders to withdraw. Two French ships of the line, Ça Ira and Censeur, were left behind, overwhelmed and forced to surrender to the British. Hotham was urged by his subordinate, Captain Horatio Nelson, to continue pursuit, but refused and withdrew his fleet for repairs. One British ship, HMS Illustrious, was later wrecked on the Italian coast. Martin sent his damaged ships into Toulon for repairs and anchored the rest of the fleet in the Îles d'Hyères in preparations for further operations; four months later the fleets fought a second engagement, the Battle of the Hyères Islands, which also ended in a minor British victory.

== Background ==
The French Revolutionary Wars expanded significantly in February 1793 when the National Convention of the newly-formed French Republic declared war on the Kingdom of Great Britain. To defend British commercial interests in the Mediterranean Sea, a Royal Navy fleet was assembled and sent to blockade the French Mediterranean Fleet in their main port of Toulon on the Southern coast of France. On arrival in August 1793, the British fleet found that Toulon was in a state of upheaval due to the Reign of Terror, and the British commander Lord Hood persuaded the citizens to declare for the French Royalist cause and allow British forces to seize the town and the French fleet. Republican forces laid siege to the city and four months of heavy fighting followed until the Royalists and their allies were expelled on 18 December. During the chaotic evacuation of the city most of the French Mediterranean fleet was set on fire by British and Spanish boarding parties.

In the aftermath, the British launched an invasion of Corsica while the French set about rebuilding their fleet. Due to failures by Spanish landing parties, many of the naval stores in Toulon had survived the fire as had more than half of the fleet, although many ships were badly damaged. For most of 1794 the surviving French ships remained in harbour, the new commander Counter-admiral Pierre Martin leading a brief sally in June with seven ships of the line which was forced to shelter at Gourjean Bay to escape an attack by Lord Hood's fleet. Problems stemming from the French Revolution several years earlier meant that the French fleet was suffering severe reductions in experience and morale in comparison with the British fleet.

By 1795 the full surviving strength of the French Mediterranean Fleet had been restored, Martin mustering 15 ships of the line and six frigates for an operation in the Ligurian Sea. The purpose of this operation is uncertain; the report of the Committee of Public Safety to the National Convention stated that the fleet was at sea to secure shipping lines in the Mediterranean, while other sources indicate that an amphibious landing in Corsica was the intention. Such an operation is mentioned in the correspondence of Représentant en mission from the National Convention, Étienne-François Letourneur, sent to provide political oversight for the fleet. This plan was also indicated by the numbers of troopships assembling in Toulon, although these vessels did not leave harbour during the operation. Historian Adolphe Thiers has suggested that the objective may have been a demonstration of force against Rome, following the lynching of French ambassador Nicolas Bassville there two years earlier.

== Martin's cruise ==
Martin was reluctant to leave Toulon until he could be certain that the lax British blockade of the port had been temporarily retired. Hood had been recalled in October 1794 and command over his fleet had passed to Vice-Admiral of the Red William Hotham, who based his ships in San Fiorenzo Bay on the northern coast of Corsica during the winter. There they had attempted partial refits and one ship, HMS Berwick, had been badly damaged due to poor handling during a gale. In late February Hotham sailed for more extensive repairs at Leghorn in the Grand Duchy of Tuscany, leaving Berwick behind. Martin received news of Hotham's departure at the start of March, and sailed from Toulon on 3 March.

The French fleet faced a series of gales, and it took four days to reach the Corsican coast; two ships were partly dismasted during the passage. There Martin's scouts discovered the damaged Berwick limping around Cap Corse with jury masts. Recognising his superiority, Martin detached a squadron of frigates and ships of the line to chase Berwick and a short battle developed in which the fleeing Berwick fought the frigate Alceste. Both ships took damage in the encounter, but as Alceste dropped back, a bar shot tore the head off Captain Adam Littlejohn on Berwick. With other ships coming into range, Berwick unable to escape and their captain dead, the surviving officers decided to surrender. Martin ordered the captured Berwick and the damaged Alceste to detach for the protected anchorage at Gourjean Bay, while his fleet continued eastwards into the Gulf of Genoa.

On same day as the capture of Berwick, news of the French departure from Toulon reached Hotham at Leghorn from Genoa, with reports that the French had passed Île Sainte-Marguerite on 6 March, heading east. This was corroborated by the scouting sloop HMS Moselle, which reported the French to the north-west, heading south. Within a day Hotham's fleet was ready to sail, leaving the harbour in the early morning of 9 March. Hotham believed that the French target was Corsica, and sent the brig HMS Tarleton under Commander Charles Brisbane to warn Littlejohn and arrange a rendezvous with Berwick off Cap Corse. On the evening of 9 March Tarleton returned with the news of the capture of Berwick, causing Hotham to veer north-west in his course. The following day the frigates scouting ahead of the British fleet discovered Martin's fleet off Cape Noli in the Gulf of Genoa, steering westwards, back towards Toulon.

== Chase ==
The weather was calm, and it was not until 11 March that ships from the main body of the British fleet sighted the French, now south and to windward of the British. The lead ship in Hotham's fleet at this time was HMS Princess Royal, leading a vanguard some 5 or 6 nautical miles (11 km) ahead of the main body of the fleet. Contact was lost for a time, but re-established on 12 March when Martin brought his fleet about. Martin advanced to within 3 nautical miles (5.6 km) of Princess Royal before tacking away to larboard. The weather remained calm with choppy seas which made manoeuvring very difficult and prevented either fleet from closing for battle; when presented with the opportunity to attack, Martin declined.

A breeze from the south in the evening gave Hotham the opportunity to form up his fleet into a line of battle with the van to the west, the French to the southwest. The night was characterised by heavy squalls, and the French ship Mercure lost a topmast; the damaged ship detached to join Berwick at Gourjean Bay, accompanied by a frigate, while continuing to steer his fleet to the west away from the British. At 08:00 the following morning another of Martin's ships, the large 80-gun Ça Ira from the rearguard of the French fleet, collided with the neighbouring Victoire and its fore and main topmasts collapsed overboard.

By the morning of 13 March it had become clear to Hotham that Martin had no intention of engaging the British fleet, and the British admiral decided to authorise a general chase, permitting his captains to break from the line and pursue the French to the best of their ships' ability. The leading ship of the chase was a frigate, the 36-gun HMS Inconstant under Captain Thomas Fremantle, which reached the damaged Ça Ira within an hour of the collision and opened fire at close range on the larboard quarter.

Seeing that Ça Ira was under threat, the French frigate Vestale attacked Inconstant from a distance, pulled past the British ship and attached a tow line to the limping ship of the line. Fremantle brought his ship around and fired into Ça Ira again, but on this occasion was exposed to the main broadside of the French ship and was subject to cannon-fire which caused casualties of three killed and 14 wounded, as well as significant damage. Unable to continue the action, Fremantle pulled back for repairs. The attack by Inconstant had allowed other British ships to join the action, so that at 10:45 the 64-gun HMS Agamemnon under Captain Horatio Nelson was able to open fire on the French ship.

Agamemnon, supported briefly by HMS Captain under Captain Samuel Reeve, retained contact with Ça Ira, firing on the French ship at long range for three and a half hours. Nelson had been able to position his ship off the stern of Ça Ira and weave back and forth behind the French ship, unleashing a devastating raking fire. The attack killed or wounded 110 crew on the French ship, and shattered the masts and rigging. Nelson had just seven men wounded in the encounter. Efforts by Sans Culotte and Barra to intervene were driven off and Ça Ira was severely damaged by Agamemnon's fire. Eventually parts of the French centre dropped back in support and Hotham ordered Nelson to fall back rather than risk being overwhelmed. While this combat continued other British ships had come up, HMS Bedford and HMS Egmont engaging three French ships, including Timoléon and Martin's flagship the 120-gun Sans Culotte. Egmont was hampered during the engagement by an explosion of a bursting cannon on the lower deck, which caused nearly 30 casualties among the gun crews. Hotham's fleet was unable to fully engage with the retreating French throughout the day however, and when night fell both fleets continued westwards, the French withdrawing with the British line in pursuit.

== Battle rejoined ==
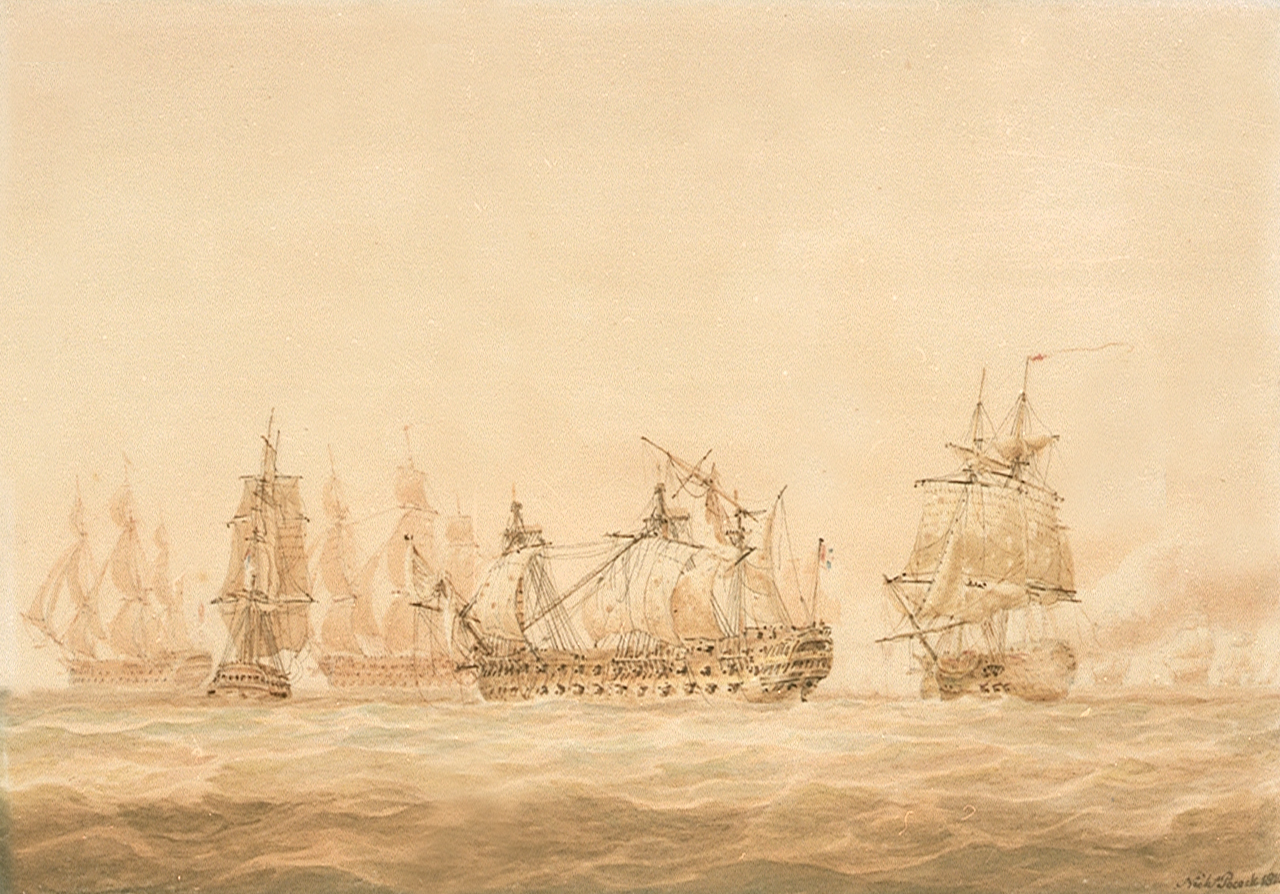
The Agamemnon engaging the Ça Ira, 13 March 1795 (Nicholas Pocock, 1810)

During the night Martin and Letourneur transferred from Sans Culotte to the frigate Friponne, which allowed them to move through the fleet more easily and direct operations more effectively, and was part of French standing orders when in a fleet battle. Orders were given for the French fleet, now in full retreat towards Toulon, to sail close to the wind on the larboard tack away from the British. For unexplained reasons Sans Culotte did not follow these orders and dropped out of the fleet during the night, while Ça Ira dropped further and further behind the main body of the French force. To better protect the damaged ship, Vestale was withdrawn and replaced with the ship of the line Censeur, towing Ça Ira back towards Toulon.

In the morning the fleets were manoeuvring 21 nautical miles (39 km) southwest of Genoa, the British closing on the French line to the west. Ça Ira and Censeur had fallen a long way back from the French fleet, and Hotham sent his fastest ships in pursuit, propelled by a northwesterly breeze. By 06:30 Bedford and Captain had caught up with the French stragglers, Captain in the lead fighting both for 15 minutes before Bedford reached the engagement. Captain suffered severe damage to its rigging, sails and masts and by 07:50 was unmanageable and drifting out of the action, and was towed to safety. Shortly afterwards Bedford too was forced to withdraw with extensive damage to the sailing rig. Both French ships had also been badly damaged, and were left drifting out of control, unable to unite with Martin's main fleet.

Martin sought to defend his beleaguered rearmost ships, and gave orders for his line to wear in succession so as to cut between the British fleet and the badly damaged Ça Ira and Censeur, which were now threatened by the recently arrived HMS Illustrious and HMS Courageux. Both fleets were by this point beset by a period of calm weather which made manoeuvres difficult, and the French turn caught HMS Lowestoft by surprise, the frigate suddenly under the guns of the leading French ship Duquesne under Captain Zacharie Allemand. Allemand fired on the frigate, and Captain Benjamin Hallowell, aware that he could not effectively respond, sent his entire crew below decks to protect them from the French gunfire. Lowestoft was badly damaged in sails and rigging, but was saved from further loss by the arrival of the Neapolitan frigate Minerva which interceded with Duquesne.

In turning, Allemand failed to follow orders effectively, meaning that instead of passing to leeward of the British ships, between the enemy and Ça Ira and Censeur, he passed to windward, sailing down the other side of the British vanguard. Hotham had succeeded in interposing his ships between the shattered French ships and Martin's main fleet, and it seemed that a close general action was inevitable. At 08:00 Allemand engaged Illustrious and then Courageux, Duquesne joined in the attack by Victoire and Tonnant, and the British ships supported more distantly by Agamemnon and Princess Royal. For an hour the French and British vanguards exchanged heavy fire, with Illustrious taking the worst of the exchange, drifting out of the battle heavily damaged; the mainmast had collapsed onto the mizzen mast and both had fallen over the side, while the ship's crew had suffered 90 casualties. Courageux was the next to suffer, similarly losing two masts and with the hull shattered by French shot. Captain Augustus Montgomery's crew had lost nearly 50 sailors killed and wounded. The French ships in this exchange were reported as firing heated shot, although it had little effect on the battle. Allemand's van squadron then pulled away from the drifting British ships, which were unsupported by the becalmed British fleet.

The rest of the French fleet had not followed Allemand, and turned away, the van following. This left the battered Ça Ira and Censeur trapped on the far side of the British fleet, Martin abandoning them to their fate. Isolated, these ships surrendered at 10:05. Without British pursuit, concerted long range firing finally ceased at 14:00; Hotham had decided that addressing the severe damage to his van ships and securing the prizes was more important than continuing the action and tacked his fleet away from Martin's rapidly disappearing ships. Nelson believed that by abandoning the prizes and disabled ships and closely following the French, Hotham could force an action which might destroy the entire French fleet. So convinced was the British captain that he took a boat to Hotham's flagship HMS Britannia to try to persuade the admiral. Hotham refused, replying that "We must be contented, we have done very well". No amount of appeals by Nelson or Rear-Admiral Samuel Goodall on Princess Royal could move Hotham to continue the action, and soon the French were out of sight.

== Aftermath ==
Hotham gathered his prizes and dismasted ships and turned eastwards for the anchorage in the Gulf of La Spezia. All of his battle line had been in action and taken casualties, with the heaviest losses aboard the badly damaged and partially dismasted Illustrious and Courageux. Captain, Bedford, Egmont and HMS Windsor Castle were also damaged, all suffering more than 20 casualties. British and Neapolitan total losses amounted to 74 killed in action and 284 wounded. French losses were not fully accounted in the aftermath of the battle, although the cumulative total on the shattered Ça Ira and Censeur was listed in British accounts as approximately 400 casualties. Among the surviving French ships casualties are not known with precision, but Duquesne, Victoire, Tonnant and Timoléon were all recorded as being badly damaged.

Hotham's ships anchored in the Gulf of La Spezia after the action, and on 17 March were struck by a heavy gale, in which the damaged Illustrious broke its tow rope to the frigate HMS Meleager and began to drift towards the coast. The ship's jury masts were lost overboard and the many holes in the hull allowed water to pour into the ship. At 13:30 the ship's situation was worsened when a loaded cannon fired accidentally, blowing off the gunport and blasting a large hole in the ship from the inside. This rendered Illustrious unmanageable, and by 14:00 the Italian coast was clearly visible to the east. His ship drifting dangerously inshore, at 14:30 Captain Thomas Frederick gave control to a sailor on board who claimed to have navigated the region and knew a safe anchorage. For five hours Illustrious struggled to avoid disaster, but at 19:30 the ship grounded near Avenza. Frederick attempted to anchor in an effort to save the ship, but this failed due to battle damage and strong winds and waves tore the rudder off at 22:30.

The following morning Tarleton came alongside the irreparably damaged Illustrious, although it was not until 20 March that the weather had abated sufficiently to permit the evacuation to begin. Tarleton, Lowestoft, HMS Romulus, and teams of ship's boats, successfully removed all of the crew and most of the ship's stores without casualties. Once the wreck had been cleared, it was set on fire and abandoned. The surviving fleet remained at La Spezia for a week effecting basic repairs, before sailing for San Fiorenzo on 25 March. Refits lasted until 18 April, at which point Hotham returned to Leghorn. Both prizes were commissioned into the Royal Navy at San Fiorenzo under their original names, although neither had long careers; Censeur was sent to escort a convoy to Britain in the late summer of 1795, still in a damaged state, and was attacked, isolated and recaptured by a French squadron off Cape St. Vincent at the action of 7 October 1795. Ça Ira survived only a little longer, catching fire accidentally while at anchor off San Fiorenzo on 11 April 1796 and being completely destroyed, although only four of the 600 crew were killed.

Martin retreated to Hyères after the battle, joined shortly afterwards by the damaged ships from Gourjean Bay and the flagship from Genoa. After separating during the night of 13 March, Sans Culotte had sought to rejoin the French fleet but been sighted and chased by a Spanish squadron, sheltering in the neutral port until the route back to France was clear. Martin sent the most damaged ships back to Toulon for refit, remaining at anchor off Hyères with 11 ships of the line until April, when he too returned to port, joined by reinforcements from the French Atlantic Fleet. The captains of Sans Culottes, Mercure and Duquesne were reprimanded by Martin for failing to follow his orders, but subsequently cleared of misconduct by a jury, which also highly commended the captains of Ça Ira and Censeur. He did not sail again until June, and was caught by Hotham once more in early July. Retreating towards Hyères, the French fleet was pursued by the British, and the rearmost ship Alcide was overrun and destroyed at the Battle of the Hyères Islands.

Although the battle was a British victory, Nelson was privately scathing of Hotham's refusal to renew the action, writing that "I could never have called it well done". Sir William Hamilton, British ambassador to the Kingdom of Naples, shared Nelson's opinion, writing that "I can, entre nous, perceive that my old friend Hotham is not quite awake enough for such a command as that of the King's fleet in the Mediterranean." Hotham believed his actions vindicated by the prevention of possible French landings on Corsica and was preoccupied by events on land, where a peace treaty between France and Tuscany placed access to the harbour at Leghorn in jeopardy. Historians have criticised Hotham's timidity, William Laird Clowes writing in 1900 stated that "it was an unsatisfactory victory. Hotham took two ships of the line but gained little credit, seeing that he might have, and should have, done much more." More than five decades after the battle the Admiralty recognised the action with a clasp attached to the Naval General Service Medal, awarded upon application to all British participants still living in 1847.

== Notes ==
1. Note A: French casualties in the battle are uncertain. William James records a figure of 400 killed and wounded on Ça Ira and Censeur alone, and notes that further losses on the French ships were inevitable but unknowable. His figures are supported by William Laird Clowes. In his biography of Nelson, Geoffrey Bennett records a total of 750 casualties on the captured ships, a figure presumably drawn from Ernle Bradford's estimate of 400 on Ça Ira and 350 on Censeur. Digby Smith's book on Napoleonic statistics, apparently drawing on James and Clowes, lists much higher figures of 600 killed and 1,000 wounded. This may come from French histories; Onésime-Joachim Troude reports 600 French sailors as killed in the battle.

== Bibliography ==
- Bennett, Geoffrey (2002) [1972]. Nelson the Commander. London: Penguin. ISBN 0-141391-29-4.
- Bradford, Ernle (1999) [1977]. Nelson: The Essential Hero. Ware: Wordsworth Military Library. ISBN 1-84022-202-6.
- Clowes, William Laird (1997) [1900]. The Royal Navy, A History from the Earliest Times to 1900, Volume III. London: Chatham Publishing. ISBN 1-86176-012-4.
- Forester, C. S. (2001) [1929]. Nelson. London: Chatham Publishing. ISBN 1-86176-178-3.
- Gardiner, Robert, ed. (2001) [1996]. Fleet Battle and Blockade. London: Caxton Editions. ISBN 1-84067-363-X.
- Grocott, Terence (2002) [1997]. Shipwrecks of the Revolutionary & Napoleonic Era. Caxton Editions. ISBN 1-84067-164-5.
- Ireland, Bernard (2005). The Fall of Toulon: The Last Opportunity the Defeat the French Revolution. Cassell. ISBN 0-3043-6726-5.
- James, William (2002) [1827]. The Naval History of Great Britain, Volume 1, 1793–1796. London: Conway Maritime Press. ISBN 0-85177-905-0.
- Mostert, Noel (2007). The Line upon a Wind: The Greatest War Fought at Sea Under Sail 1793–1815. Vintage Books. ISBN 9-78071-260-9272.
- Smith, Digby (1998). The Napoleonic Wars Data Book. Greenhill Books. ISBN 1-85367-276-9. OCLC 231766509.
- Troude, Onésime-Joachim (1867). Batailles navales de la France (in French). Vol. 2. Challamel ainé. pp. 424–431.
