= Martin's cruise of 1794 =

1794 French naval operation against Great Britain

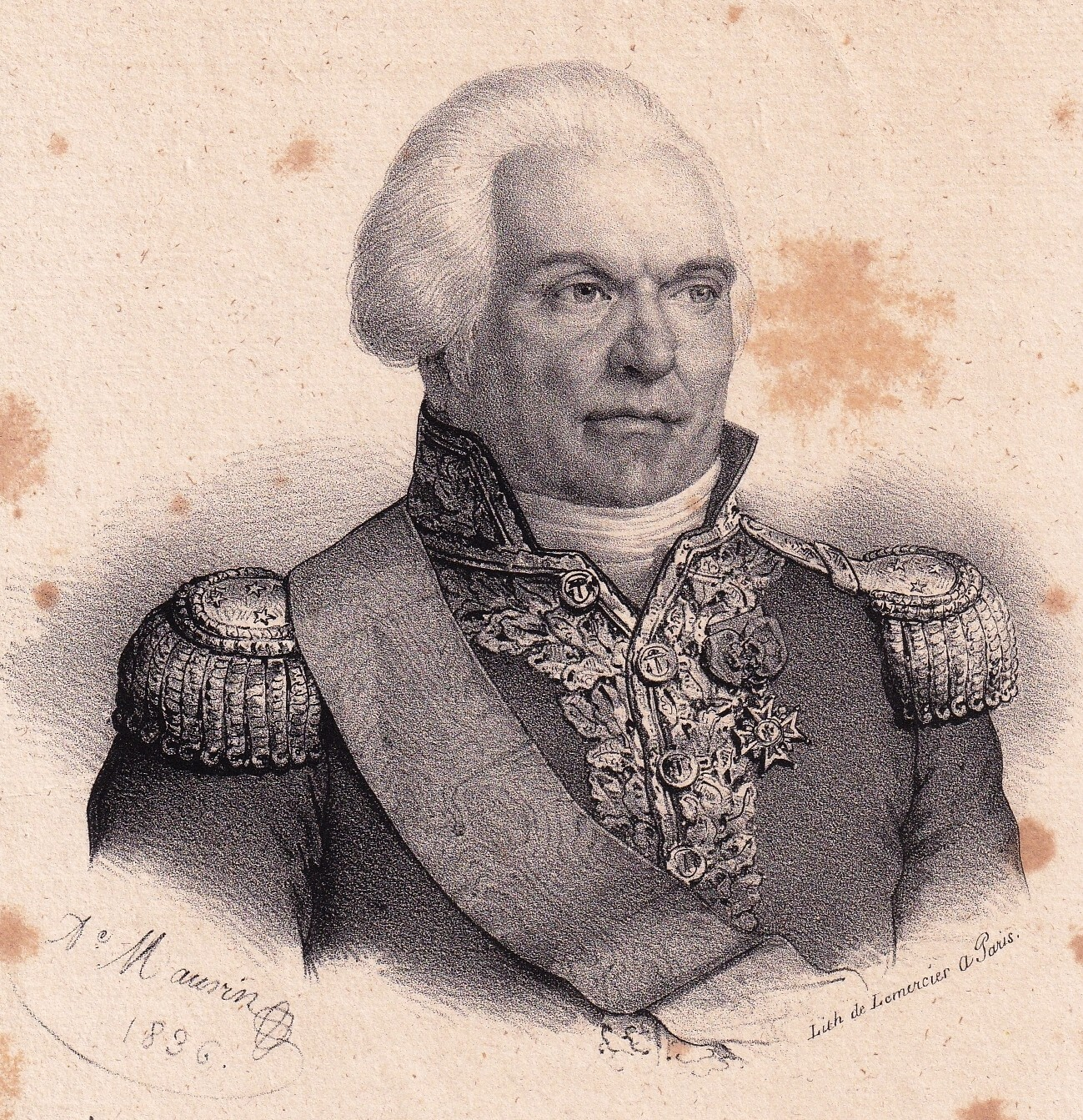
Pierre Martin, the operation's commander

Martin's cruise of 1794 was the only significant French naval operation in the Mediterranean Sea conducted in 1794. In 1793 France had gone to war with Great Britain and a wide coalition of European enemies in the French Revolutionary Wars. Early in the conflict the British had seized the French Mediterranean Fleet and their home port of Toulon, the town enduring a four month siege by French Republican forces in which the fleet was badly damaged. With the town and fleet back in French hands, the French set about effecting repairs as the British attacked the island of Corsica.

In June 1794 French Counter-admiral Pierre Martin led a squadron of ships out to contest British operations off Corsica. There was initial success when the frigate Boudeuse attacked and captured the Sardinian frigate Alceste off Fréjus on 8 June, but three days later Martin was forced to retreat from the main strength of the British fleet under Lord Hood. The French anchored in Gourjean Bay, and although Hood planned a number of attacks on the French position, ultimately it was decided that Martin was too well protected and a blockade was put in place instead.

Martin was able to escape the blockade in November and return to Toulon without further incident. The captured Alceste, formerly a French ship captured in 1793, was taken to Nice and returned to service with the French Navy. The frigate went on to play a crucial role at the action of 8 March 1795 and came under heavy fire at the Battle of the Hyères Islands trying to save a damaged French ship of the line. Alceste was eventually captured once more by the British in 1799.

== Background ==
A few months after the entry of Great Britain into the French Revolutionary Wars in February 1793, a large Royal Navy fleet was sent to operate in the Mediterranean. Their principal mission was a blockade of Toulon, the main base for the French Mediterranean Fleet. The British fleet, under Lord Hood, arrived off Toulon in August 1793 to find that the port was in upheaval, conflict between Girondists and Jacobins raging against the backdrop of the Reign of Terror. Hood interceded in the dispute, persuading the Girondist faction to declare for the exiled French monarchy and invite the British to take control of the city and fleet.

Hood's forced entered Toulon, and the town was soon counter-attacked by French Republican forces. The ensuing Siege of Toulon lasted four months, the city falling to Republican attack on 18 December. At its conclusion, Hood sent boat parties into Toulon harbour to burn the French fleet, but ultimately only half of the fleet was destroyed, the remainder left damaged but repairable. Those French ships in condition to sail were removed from the harbour and distributed among the allies who had participated in the siege; the British took six frigates and gave one, Alceste, to the Kingdom of Sardinia.

In the spring of 1794, as the French repaired their damaged fleet, Hood turned his attention to the French-held island of Corsica, then in open rebellion. In the ensuing invasion of Corsica, Hood's forces allied with the Corsican irregulars to attack first San Fiorenzo and then Bastia, besieging the French garrisons of the Corsican towns and forcing them to surrender.

== Martin's cruise ==
In Toulon, command of the French fleet had been given to Counter-admiral Pierre Martin, who was assembling a 15-ship convoy to supply Corsica and raise the siege of Bastia. A squadron of his less damaged ships, comprising seven ships of the line and several frigates, was to escort the convoy. After Bastia fell to the British on 19 May, the original plans for the French relief convoy were abandoned, but Martin decided to offer a challenge to the British hegemony in the Ligurian Sea, and sailed with his squadron for a cruise in the region on 6 June.

It is reported that shortly after departure the French squadron sighted a 10-ship British squadron to south and formed a line of battle, but the British refused the engagement, sailed by at a distance of 9 nautical miles (17 km), turned, and disappeared the next day. There is no mention of this encounter in British histories. News of Martin's activity soon reached Hood, then at anchor with 13 ships of the line off Bastia, and he ordered Alceste, operating as part of his fleet under a Captain Ross, to sail from Bastia to the French coast to warn the British ships operating off Toulon.

=== Catching Alceste ===
Action of 8 June 1794
- Part of the French Revolutionary Wars
Date	8 June 1794
Location	Off Fréjus
Result	French victory

Belligerents
France	Sardinia

Commanders and leaders
Pierre Martin	Captain Ross

Strength
Frigate Boudeuse; 80-gun Tonnant	Frigate Alceste

On 8 June 1794, as the French squadron passed eastwards along the coast, lookouts spotted an unidentified sail between the squadron and the shore; this ship was Alceste. Martin's squadron then approached the ship flying false British ensigns which fooled Ross. Alceste approached the squadron with confidence and his crew only realised their mistake when it was too late to escape. Martin sent the 32-gun frigate Boudeuse in chase, and the frigate successfully overhauled Alceste some 6 nautical miles (11 km) to windward of the French squadron.

Boudeuse and Alceste fought for two hours, the smaller French ship taking serious damage to its rigging and mainmast from the gunfire of Alceste. Ross was unable however to escape his opponent, and this allowed the 80-gun ship of the line Tonnant to pull within range. Recognising that further resistance was hopeless, Ross allowed Tonnant to fire three shots before he struck his colours. Boudeuse was so damaged that Martin sent the ship back to Toulon for repairs, although Alceste was mostly intact and was sent to Nice under a prize crew with the captured 14-gun merchant brig Expedition, taken the same day by the frigate Sérieuse while sailing from Bastia to Livorno.

=== Retreat to Gourjean Bay ===
Within hours of the victory over Alceste, Martin was being hunted by Hood and the main British Mediterranean Fleet. On 10 June Hood discovered the French squadron and gave chase. Martin retreated before the larger British fleet, leading Hood by about 12 nautical miles (22 km). At 14:00 on 11 June Martin reached the sheltered anchorage at Gourjean Bay, his rearmost ships exchanging fire with HMS Dido under Captain George Henry Towry as they entered the bay, which was protected by forts overlooking the anchorage. As it entered the bay, the French squadron was becalmed, and had to be taken in tow by their launches before they could anchor in suitable positions.

Hood intended to lead his fleet into the bay and bring Martin to battle, issuing detailed plans of attack to his captains, but the calm forestalled this effort and gave Martin time to remove cannon from his ships and erect batteries on the shore, significantly strengthening his position. Hood ordered fireships to be readied but these weapons were driven back on approaching the bay by the French forts and batteries. Hood then withdrew with part of his fleet to the ongoing Siege of Calvi, leaving a force under Vice-Admiral William Hotham to blockade the French. Hotham trapped Martin's division in the bay for five months, and it was not until 2 November that it returned to Toulon, after a storm drove off Hotham's squadron.

== Aftermath ==
With Martin unable to influence operations on Corsica, Calvi fell to the British in August and Corsica became a self-governing part of the British Empire. Martin continued with repairs to the fleet, so that by March 1795 he was able to deploy 17 ships on a renewed operation in the Ligurian Sea. With this fleet was Alceste, which fought at the action of 8 March 1795 when the British ship of the line HMS Berwick, badly damaged in a storm, was chased down and captured by a division of Martin's fleet. Alceste led the attack and although badly damaged, the frigate was able to kill the British captain and delay Berwick until heavier support could arrive.

Later in the year Alceste was with the fleet which fought at the Battle of the Hyères Islands, the frigate attempting unsuccessfully to bring support to the crippled French ship Alcide while under heavy fire. Alceste continued to serve with the French Mediterranean Fleet until 1799, when the ship was part of a French squadron overrun and captured by a British fleet under Lord Keith during the Croisière de Bruix campaign.

== Orders of battle ==
Counter-admiral Martin's squadron
Ship	Rate	Guns	Commander	Notes
Sans-Culottes	First Rate	120	Counter-admiral Pierre Martin; Captain Pierre-Félix de Lapalisse	
Tonnant	Third Rate	80	Captain Julien Cosmao-Kerjulien	
Généreux	Third Rate	74	Captain Louis	
Censeur	Third Rate	74	Captain Pierre Benoît	
Heureux	Third Rate	74	Captain Charles Lacaille	
Timoléon	Third Rate	74	Captain Joseph Khrom	
Duquesne	Third Rate	74	Captain Zacharie Allemand	
Junon	Frigate	40		
Friponne	Frigate			
Sérieuse	Frigate	32		
Boudeuse	Frigate	32	Lieutenant Charbonnier	Damaged and returned to Toulon following battle with Alceste.
Badine	Corvette	20		
Alerte	Brig	10		
Surveillante	Schooner			
Jacobin	Xebec	10		ex-Bonne Aventure.
Sources: Troude, vol.2 p. 367. James lists Bonnet Rouge as part of this squadron, but the ship is not listed in French sources.

Admiral Lord Hood's fleet
Ship	Rate	Guns	Commander	Notes
HMS Victory	First rate	100	Admiral Lord Hood; Captain John Nicholson Inglefield; Captain John Knight	Returned to Corsica in June.
HMS Britannia	First rate	100	Vice-Admiral William Hotham; Captain John Holloway	Remained with blockade squadron until November.
HMS Princess Royal	Second rate	98	Vice-Admiral Samuel Goodall; Captain John Child Purvis	Returned to Corsica in June.
HMS Windsor Castle	Second rate	98	Rear-Admiral Philip Cosby; Captain Sir Thomas Byard	Remained with blockade squadron until November.
HMS St George	Second rate	98	Rear-Admiral Sir Hyde Parker; Captain Thomas Foley	Remained with blockade squadron until November.
HMS Alcide	Third rate	74	Rear-Admiral Robert Linzee; Captain John Woodley	
HMS Terrible	Third rate	74	Rear-Admiral Skeffington Lutwidge; Captain George Campbell	
HMS Egmont	Third rate	74	Rear-Admiral Archibald Dickson; Captain John Sutton	
HMS Bedford	Third rate	74	Captain Robert Mann	
HMS Captain	Third rate	74	Captain Samuel Reeve	
HMS Fortitude	Third rate	74	Captain William Young	
HMS Illustrious	Third rate	74	Captain Thomas Frederick	
HMS Berwick	Third rate	74	Captain William Shield	
HMS Meleager	Fifth rate	32	Captain George Cockburn	
HMS Romulus	Fifth rate	36	Captain George Hope	
HMS Juno	Fifth rate	32	Captain Lord Amelius Beauclerk	
HMS Dido	Fifth rate	28	Captain George Henry Towry	Briefly in action on 11 June.
Two of the 74-gun ships returned to Corsica with Hood in June.
Sources: James, p. 192

== Bibliography ==
- Clowes, William Laird (1997) [1900]. The Royal Navy, A History from the Earliest Times to 1900, Volume III. London: Chatham Publishing. ISBN 1-86176-012-4.
- Gardiner, Robert, ed. (2001) [1996]. Fleet Battle and Blockade. London: Caxton Editions. ISBN 1-84067-363-X.
- Ireland, Bernard (2005). The Fall of Toulon: The Last Opportunity the Defeat the French Revolution. Cassell. ISBN 0-3043-6726-5.
- James, William (2002) [1827]. The Naval History of Great Britain, Volume 1, 1793–1796. London: Conway Maritime Press. ISBN 0-85177-905-0.
- Mostert, Noel (2007). The Line upon a Wind: The Greatest War Fought at Sea Under Sail 1793 – 1815. Vintage Books. ISBN 9-78071-260-9272.
- Troude, Onésime-Joachim (1867). Batailles navales de la France (in French). Vol. 2. Challamel ainé.
