= Invasion of Corsica (1794) =

1794 invasion of the War of the First Coalition

- Part of the War of the First Coalition
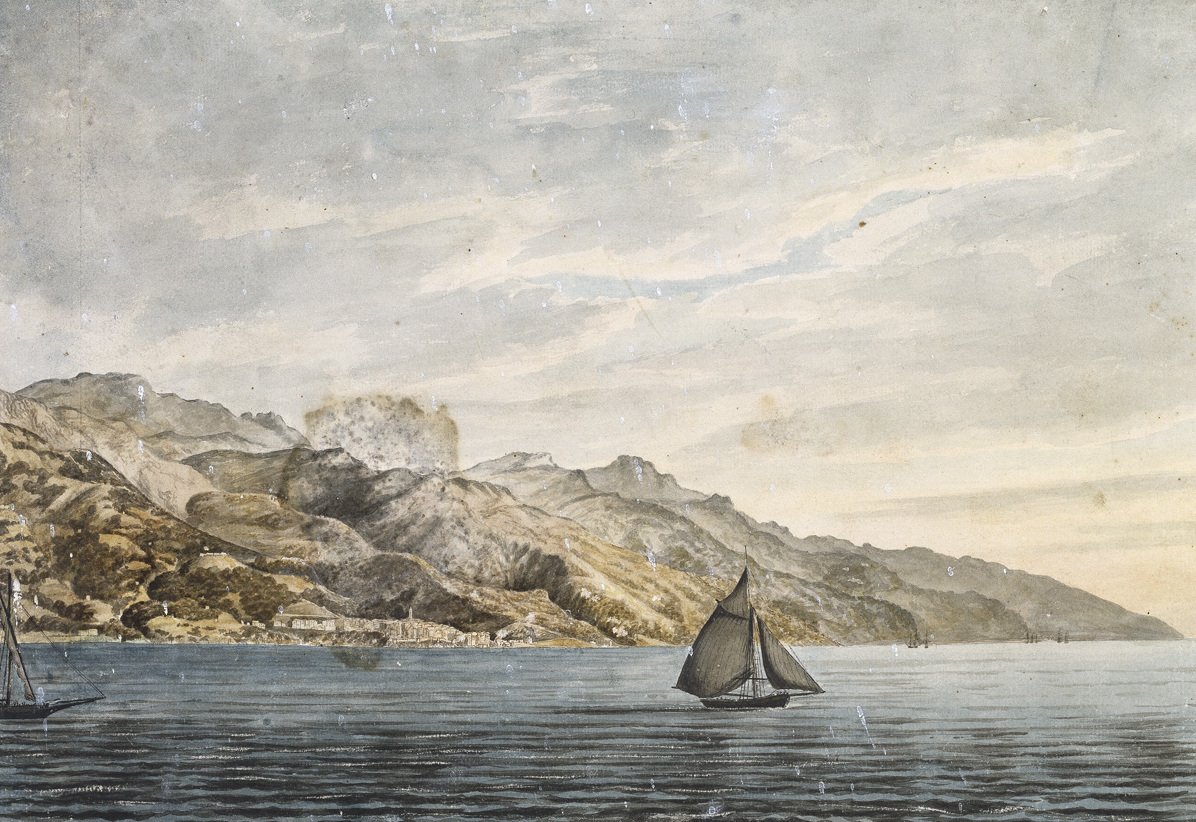
- The siege of Bastia, a major engagement of the invasion
| Date | 7 February – 10 August 1794 |
| Location | Corsica |
| Result | Anglo-Corsican victory |

Belligerents
| Great Britain; Corsica | France |

Commanders and leaders
| Samuel Hood; David Dundas; Charles Stuart; Horatio Nelson; Pasquale Paoli | Raphaël Casabianca; Jean Michel; Antoine Gentili |

The invasion of Corsica was a campaign fought in the spring and summer of 1794 by combined British military and Corsican irregular forces against a French garrison, early in the French Revolutionary Wars. The campaign centred on sieges of three principal towns in Northern Corsica; San Fiorenzo, Bastia and Calvi, which were in turn surrounded, besieged and bombarded until by August 1794 French forces had been driven from the island entirely.

Corsica is a large island in the Ligurian Sea; naval forces stationed on the island have ability to exercise control over the waters off the coast of Southern France and Northwestern Italy. This was a principal theatre of the early French Revolutionary Wars, and the British commander in the region, Vice-Admiral of the Red Lord Hood, viewed control of Corsica as a vital component of his blockade of the French fleet based at Toulon. Corsica had been annexed by France in 1768, and the population had been resentful and rebellious ever since. The fervour of the French Revolution in 1789 had stirred their ambitions for independence, and their leader Pasquale Paoli appealed to Hood for support. Hood was initially distracted by the Siege of Toulon, but in early 1794 turned his attention to Corsica.

Combining naval bombardments with amphibious landings of British soldiers and marines, and supported by Corsican irregulars, the British forces attacked the defences of San Fiorenzo, forcing the French to abandon the town and retreat to Bastia. Hood then led a force around the island and laid siege to the town, which surrendered after 37 days of blockade. This victory was sufficient for the Corsican people, through Paoli, to pledge allegiance to Britain. British reinforcements then laid siege to the last French-held fortress on the island, at Calvi, which was bombarded for two months, finally surrendering in August 1794.

Corsica proved a mixed asset for the British; the island's anchorages provided some relief for a fleet operating at the end of a long supply chain, but the instability of Corsican politics and repeated French efforts to disrupt British control consumed valuable resources. By late 1796, with the French victorious in Northern Italy and the Spanish declaration of war on Britain following the Treaty of San Ildefonso, British control of Corsica was no longer tenable. British forces withdrew from the island, which was rapidly seized once more by the French.

== Background ==
Corsica is a large, mountainous island in the Ligurian Sea, a region of the Mediterranean bordered by Western Spain, Southern France and Northwestern Italy. Control of the island, and in particular the harbour at San Fiorenzo, can allow a naval force to exercise regional dominance over this important waterway. Corsica was for centuries a part of the Republic of Genoa, although by the mid-eighteenth century it was de facto independent as the Corsican Republic, led by Pasquale Paoli. Unable to contest Paoli's control of the island, the Genoese sold Corsica to the Kingdom of France in 1768, and a French invasion swiftly captured and annexed the island.

Following the French Revolution in 1789 the chaotic political situation and fervent spread of republicanism revived the Corsican independence movement and encouraged Paoli, living in exile for 22 years, to return. Paoli swiftly defeated his political enemies on Corsica, including the prominent Bonaparte family, and assumed control of the island once more. By early 1793, during the political repression of the Reign of Terror in mainland France, Paoli found himself threatened with arrest by representatives of the French National Convention. In response, Paoli ordered his followers to form irregular partisan units which swiftly drove the French military garrison into the three northern towns of San Fiorenzo, Calvi and the capital of Bastia. Paoli then sought support from external allies.

Great Britain had entered the French Revolutionary Wars in January 1793, when the French National Convention declared war amid rising tensions. Britain had significant commercial interests in the Mediterranean, and so a large fleet was immediately sent to blockade the French Mediterranean fleet, which operated from the heavily defended port of Toulon. The nearest British port was at Gibraltar, which was too far distant to operate as an immediate base from which to enforce the blockade. The British had, earlier in the eighteenth century, controlled the Spanish island of Minorca as a forward base for Mediterranean operations, but had lost control of the island in the American Revolutionary War ten years earlier. Corsica had often been proposed as a replacement, and was favoured by Secretary of State for War Henry Dundas. British agents in Italy had already made contact with Paoli when the fleet under Vice-Admiral of the Red Lord Hood arrived in mid-August 1793.

Corsican affairs were however a secondary priority for Hood, as shortly after his arrival the citizens of Toulon overthrew their republican government and, with British encouragement, declared for the deposed French monarchy. Hood's fleet entered the port, seized the French Mediterranean fleet, and garrisoned the landward fortifications. For four months Hood attempted to hold on to the captured city with an unreliable coalition of French, British and Italian troops, as a French Republican army, directed in part by Napoleon Bonaparte, gradually overwhelmed the defences. On 18 December 1793 the French seized the heights overlooking the harbour and the British fleet was forced to hastily withdraw, carrying thousands of royalist refugees. An attempt was made to burn the captured French fleet, still at anchor in the harbour, but it was only partially successful. Many of these refugees were later landed in Corsica.

=== Corsican operations in 1793 ===
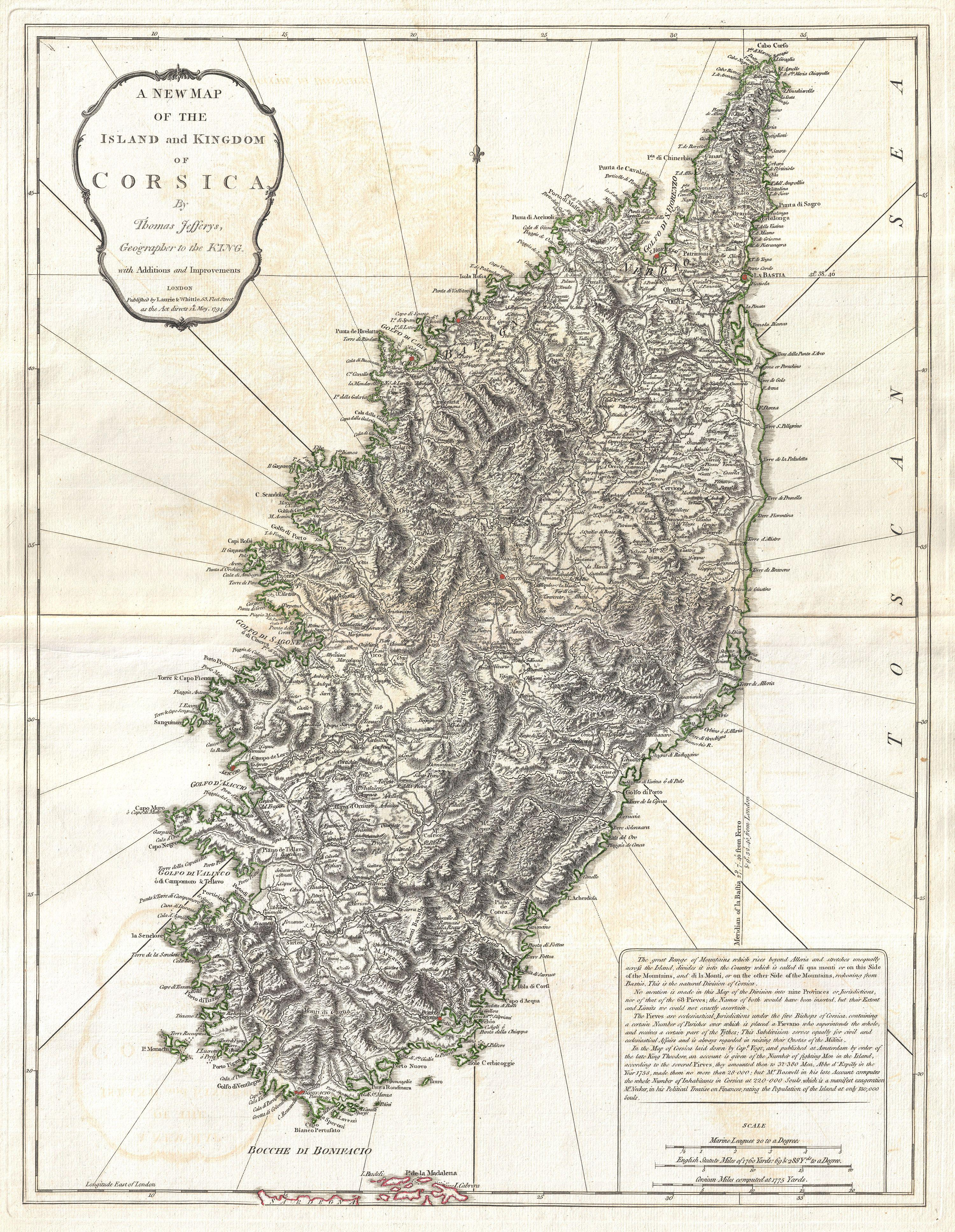
1794 map of Corsica

At Paoli's urging, Hood had sent a small squadron to Corsica during the siege of Toulon under Commodore Robert Linzee, with instructions to appeal to the French garrisons of Bastia and Calvi to surrender. When this was not forthcoming, he attempted to capture San Fiorenzo with his squadron. Linzee led his ships into the bay on 19 September, and captured the Torra di Mortella, which overlooked the anchorage. A second attack on 1 October on the well-prepared Torra di Fornali however came under heavy fire and Linzee was forced to withdraw with heavy casualties, many caused by heated shot.

In late October a French frigate squadron attempted to land reinforcements on Corsica, escaping an attack by the British ship of the line HMS Agamemnon under Captain Horatio Nelson off Sardinia at the action of 22 October 1793. This force landed at San Fiorenzo and Bastia, and with these troops the French were able to launch limited counter attacks against the Corsican irregulars, recapturing the town of Farinole and most of the Cap Corse region. Linzee remained offshore, his ships running a blockade and trapping the frigates in harbour, but small vessels from Italy were easily able to evade his ships, prompting protests from Paoli. Further British naval forces, under Nelson, were sent to intercept these ships; Nelson raided the Corsican coast, destroying the island's only mill and burning a wine convoy. After just two weeks however Nelson was ordered to withdraw to assist Hood in the evacuation of Toulon.

With the British now forced to seek another Mediterranean base, Paoli sent messages offering to provide Corsica to Hood as a self-governing colony of the British Empire, along the model adopted by the Kingdom of Ireland. In early January 1794, Hood sent Edward Cooke and Thomas Nepean as ambassadors to Paoli to gauge his reliability, the officers returning with overly-optimistic assessments of the defences of the French-held towns and of overall numbers; Paoli promised no more than 2,000 French troops, when in fact there were more than 4,500 split between the three garrisons. Convinced by Paoli's offer, Hood sent Sir Gilbert Elliot to negotiate terms, along with Lieutenant-colonel John Moore and engineer Major George Koehler to offer military support. In early February Hood sailed from his temporary anchorage in the Îles d'Hyères, and ordered the invasion of the island to go ahead.

== Landings in Corsica ==
=== Siege of San Fiorenzo ===
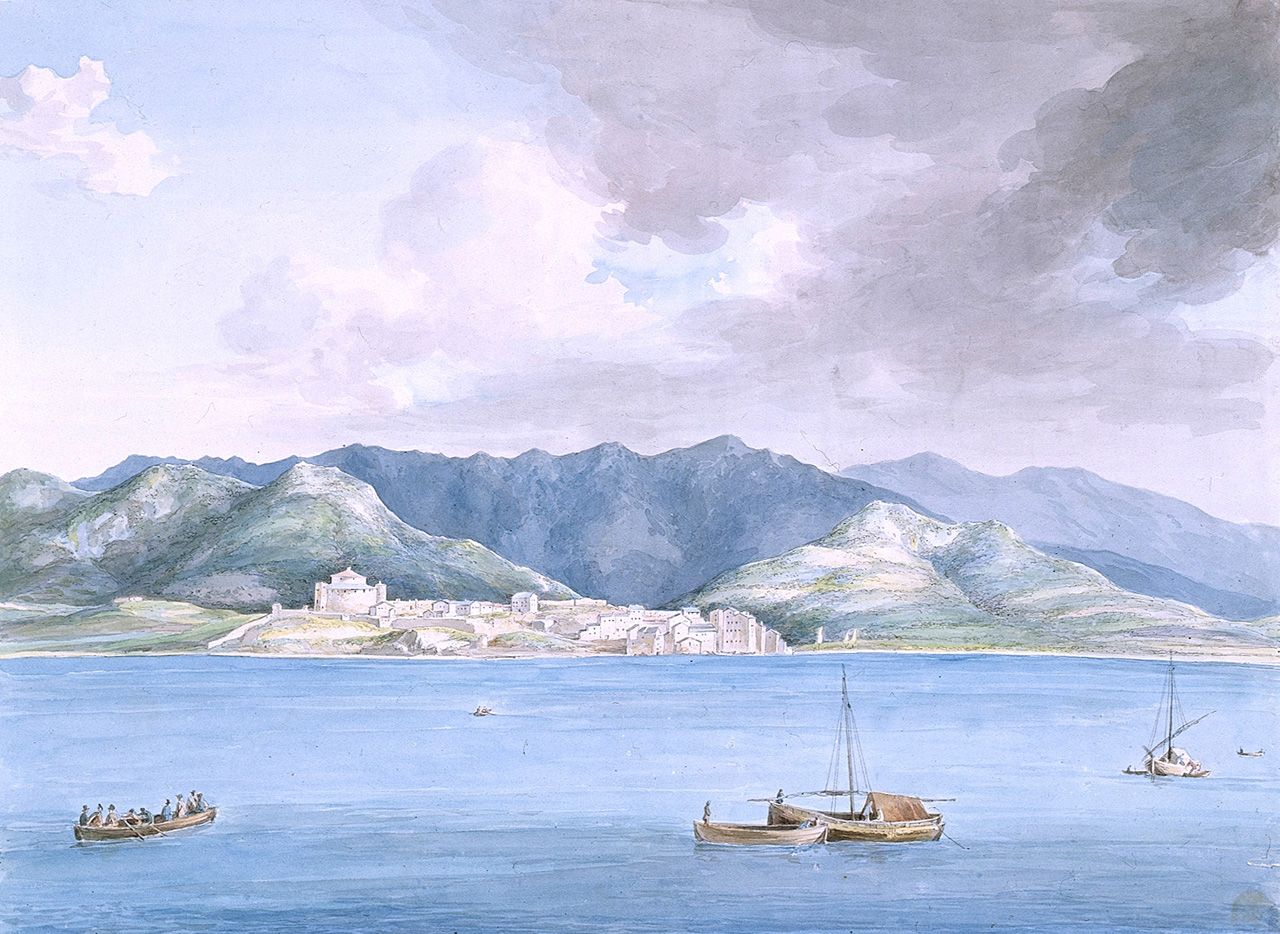
c. 1795 illustration of San Fiorenzo

The British Army officer tasked with leading the operation was Major-general David Dundas. Dundas was a cautious and despondent officer, whose attitude clashed with that of Hood; the two had fallen out during the siege of Toulon. On Paoli's advice, the first attack was made on San Fiorenzo, the scene of Linzee's defeat six months earlier. On 7 February British troops disembarked from the transports, landing unopposed on the coast to the west of the Torra di Mortella. The Torra di Mortella was ineffectually attacked first from the sea on 8 February by a small naval squadron, during which HMS Fortitude was hit with several heated shot which ignited an ammunition box and killed six men and wounded another 56. The plan to attack from the sea was abandoned and instead batteries were erected on land by parties of British sailors under Moore. On 10 February artillery fire from shore batteries established by Moore set the tower on fire and the garrison surrendered. Moore then marched his force overland with their cannon to attack the nearby Convention Redoubt, which was successfully stormed on 17 February. With the town and ships in the harbour under threat of bombardment the French withdrew the following day, leaving two scuttled frigates in the bay.

=== Siege of Bastia ===
The French had retreated across the Serra mountains to Bastia, evading Corsican forces stationed to block their withdrawal. This began the second stage of the invasion, targeting Bastia. The planned attack on the town was delayed by an extended squabble between Hood and Dundas over prosecution of the blockade which resulted in Dundas' resignation and replacement by Colonel Abraham D'Aubant in March. The attack did not therefore take place until 4 April, when a force of 1,450 British troops under Colonel William Villettes and Nelson landed north of the town. Hood stationed the main body of the British Mediterranean fleet just off the harbour, maintaining the blockade through an inshore squadron under Benjamin Caldwell. On 11 April a naval attack on the town was driven off by the town's batteries and the small frigate HMS Proselyte was sunk.

For 14 days the town was bombarded from batteries Moore erected on heights overlooking the defences, Hood impatient for a surrender from the French commander, Jean-Pierre Lacombe-Saint-Michel. On 25 April he ordered D'Aubant to storm the town, but the colonel refused, and Hood resolved instead to starve the defenders out. On 12 May Lacombe-Saint-Michel escaped from the town to return to France, and ten days later, with food reserves depleted and nearly a quarter of the garrison sick or wounded, his deputy Antoine Gentili surrendered to Hood offshore. The terms of the surrender allowed the French forces safe passage back to France and were highly controversial with the Corsicans, who protested strongly but were ignored.

In the aftermath of the surrender of Bastia, Paoli agreed terms with Hood for British control of Corsica and on 1 June national elections were held, the island's parliament sitting on 16 June for the first time and announcing a new constitution. Paoli's deputy Carlo Andrea Pozzo di Borgo was named president and Elliott became acting viceroy. The constitution offered wide male suffrage, biennial elections and strong executive powers firmly held by Paoli through Pozzo di Borgo, but within weeks government had broken down in bickering between Elliott and Pozzo di Borgo over Corsican persecution of French supporters still living on the island.

=== Siege of Calvi ===
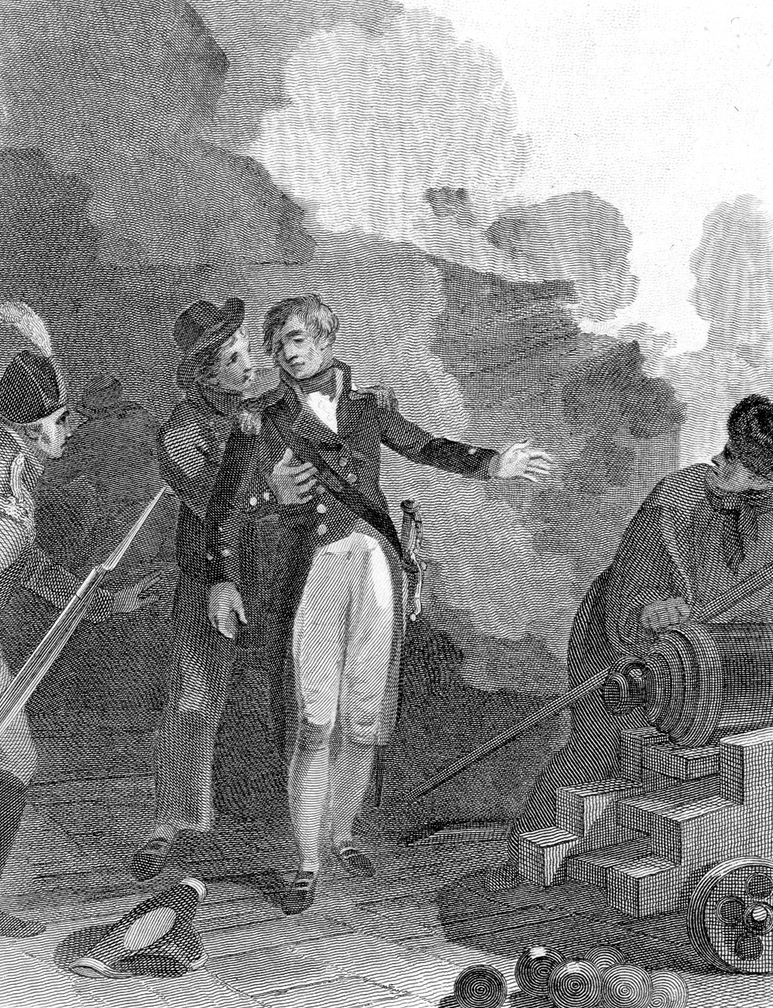
Nelson losing his eye during the siege of Calvi

The final operation of the campaign targeted Calvi, a fortified port on the northwestern coast of Corsica commanded by the overall French commander in Corsica, Raphaël de Casabianca. Calvi was protected by two modern forts; to the west was the star fort Fort Mozello, supported an external battery, and to the southwest was Fort Mollinochesco, which watched the main road from the Corsican interior. In the Bay of Calvi two French frigates were positioned to fire on any attacking force. The British forces landed on 17 June outside the town under the command of Charles Stuart and Nelson and dragged cannon over the mountains to erect batteries overlooking the forts. Hood was absent for most of the siege as the French fleet had sailed form Toulon in June for a short campaign, and Hood was engaged in blockading this force in Gourjean Bay.

By 6 July Mollinochesco was badly damaged and the garrison withdrew into Calvi. British attention then turned to Mozello, which was bombarded for twelve days. A large breach was blown in the walls of Mozello, but counter battery fire caused significant casualties in the British gun crews, including Nelson, who was blinded in one eye. On 18 July Stuart ordered Moore and David Wemyss to lead an attack on the fort, which was taken in a fierce battle following hand-to-hand fighting on the walls. The British then subjected the town to heavy bombardment, causing significant damage and casualties. In late July there were a series of negotiations and a truce, but the arrival of supplies at Calvi at the end of the month caused a brief resumption of hostilities. Eventually, with food and ammunition running low, Casabianca formally surrendered, receiving the same terms as had been awarded at Bastia. By the time of the surrender there were barely 400 British soldiers remaining fit for duty, as malaria and dysentery swept through the camp. In some ways, the siege is most notable for the prominence it brought to the career of Nelson, whose acknowledged leadership in these operations led to future command opportunities.

== Aftermath ==
With the French expelled from the island, Corsica settled into its status as a self-governing part of the British Empire. Hood used San Fiorenzo as an anchorage for his fleet, despite its lack of dockyard facilities. Danger to Corsica from the sea remained an ever-present concern; in August 1794 the 16-gun HMS Scout was escorting the Corsican coral fishing fleet off Cape Bon when it was attacked and captured by two French frigates. The defenceless fleet scattered and several boats were seized by Algerian pirates, the crews made slaves. British envoy Frederick North eventually secured their release for £48,000. In early 1795, a French effort to land 25,000 troops on Corsica was defeated by the British fleet at the Battle of Genoa, and for the remainder of the British occupation of the island French privateers and agents regularly landed on the coast.

In the aftermath of the successful invasion of Corsica, developments focused on the island's capital Bastia, where a series of personal disputes threatened to derail the government of the island. First Stuart and Elliott engaged in a bitter squabble over control of the military forces on the island which eventually resulted in Stuart's resignation. At about the same time, Elliott was also engaged in preventing Paoli from enacting reprisals and seizing the property of French-supporters in Corsica, a violation of the terms of surrender.

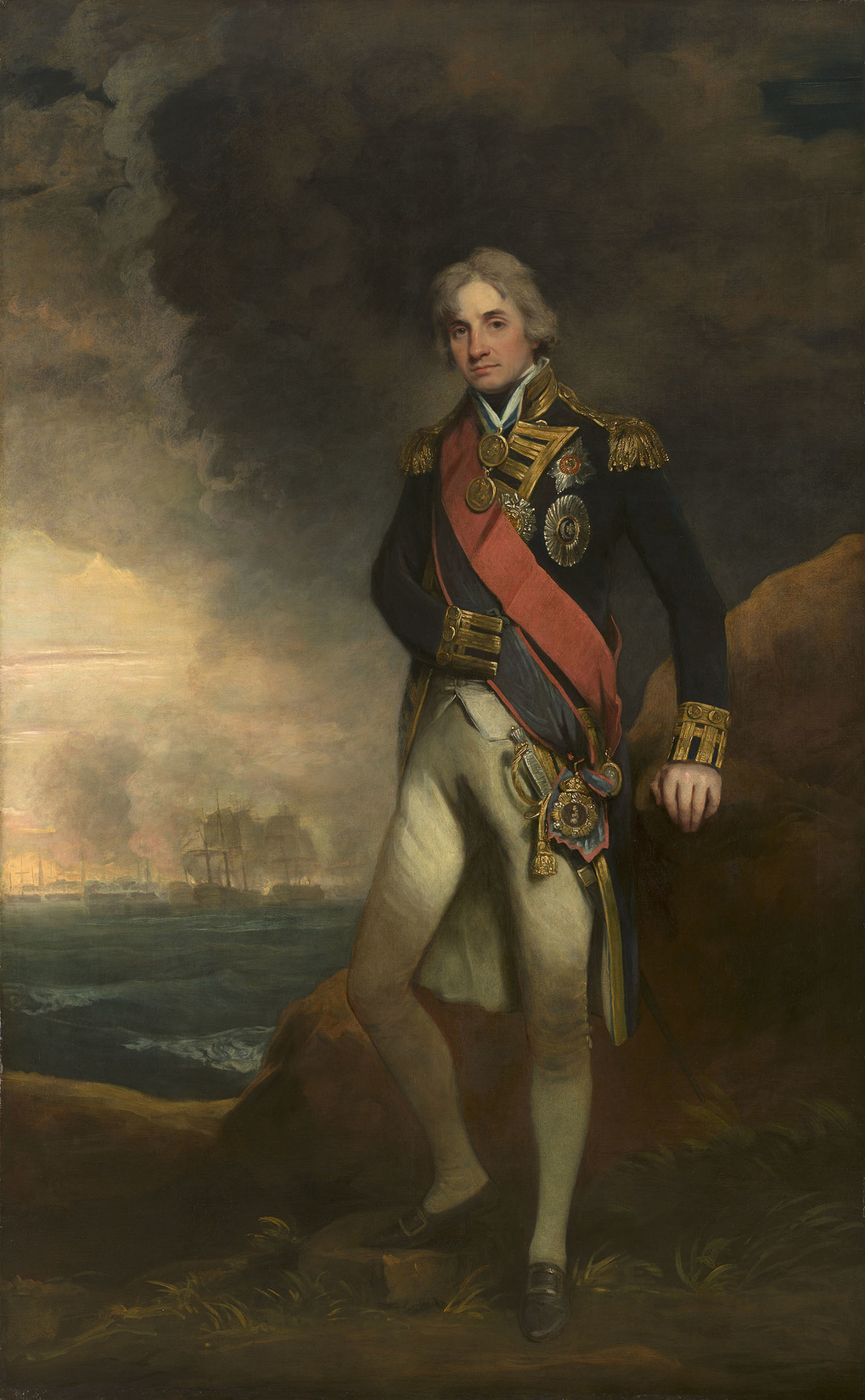
1801 portrait of Nelson by John Hoppner. The Corsican campaign is often credited as the first in which Nelson rose to prominence within the Royal Navy.

These divisions only widened as the relationship continued; in 1795 the British established an Extraordinary Commission which ostensibly investigated crime on the island, but also considered matters of treason. This was in direct contravention of the constitution agreed the previous year and proved unpopular. Alongside this issue, broken British promises on infrastructure investment and a growing rift between Paoli and Pozzo di Borgo created tension; in 1795 Paoli established an informal rival presidency at Rostino and a growing faction in his support at the Bastia parliament, led by his nephew Leoni Paoli. In July 1795 these disputes boiled over in the "assassination of the bust", in which a bust of Paoli was publicly mocked by Corsican members of Elliot's entourage in Ajaccio. Rioting and protest swept the island, and civil violence was only narrowly avoided by Paoli's departure for Britain in October.

In 1796, resentment against British taxation added to the political stresses of the colony, and in March some of the central highlands of the island rose up against the British, centred on the Corte area. For several months there was scattered fighting between rebels and Corsican government forces, including a successful British offensive at Ajaccio and another near Bastia which failed to come to grips with rebel forces. Eventually, unable to effectively crush the rebellion and with French agents operating openly on the island, Elliot placated some rebels and pacified others achieving some stability by October. The situation in the Mediterranean was deteriorating however, with British forces increasingly stretched by Bonaparte's victories in Italy.

In August 1796 the government of Spain signed the Treaty of San Ildefonso with the French Republic, declaring war on Great Britain. The British forces in the Mediterranean, operating at the end of long and vulnerable supply chains, now found a large and powerful enemy to their rear. Gibraltar in particular was under threat, and orders were immediately sent to Elliot stripping the British garrison of Corsica to defend the fortress at the entrance to the Mediterranean. When news broke in Corsica in October, the simmering rebellions spread. Revolutionary committees appeared in towns across the island, who began to negotiate terms with the French forces in Italy. On 14 October Nelson forced the committees in Bastia to disperse on threat of violence, but French troops had already landed at Macinaggio and on 19–20 October Elliot and the remaining British military and diplomatic personnel and 370 Corsican refugees embarked on Nelson's convoy and sailed for Portoferraio. Over the next week the remaining garrisons at Calvi and San Fiorenzo were withdrawn, the defences of the latter deliberately destroyed. By this point French troops under Antoine Gentili had already captured most of the island with Corsican support. In December 1796, the British fleet, now under the command of Sir John Jervis, withdrew from the Mediterranean entirely.

Eight years later, when the British government was designing invasion defences during the Napoleonic Wars, the resistance of the Torra di Mortella in 1794 was recalled, and sketches were rediscovered. From these designs more than a hundred towers were ordered to be built along the south and east coasts of Britain. Known as Martello Towers due to a garbled translation, by the time they were completed the invasion threat was over.

In 1814, British troops landed on Corsica again; brushing aside French resistance they again occupied the island. The Treaty of Bastia gave the British crown sovereignty over the island, but it was later repudiated by Lord Castlereagh who insisted that the island should be returned to a restored French monarchy and so they withdrew.

== Bibliography ==
- Bennett, Geoffrey (2002) [1972]. Nelson the Commander. London: Penguin. ISBN 0-141391-29-4.
- Clowes, William Laird (1997) [1900]. The Royal Navy, A History from the Earliest Times to 1900, Volume III. London: Chatham Publishing. ISBN 1-86176-012-4.
- Gardiner, Robert, ed. (2001) [1996]. Fleet Battle and Blockade. London: Caxton Editions. ISBN 1-84067-363-X.
- Gregory, Desmond (1985). The Ungovernable Rock: A History of the Anglo-Corsican Kingdom and its role in Britain's Mediterranean Strategy During the Revolutionary War (1793-1797). London & Toronto: Associated University Presses. ISBN 9780838632253.
- Ireland, Bernard (2005). The Fall of Toulon: The Last Opportunity the Defeat the French Revolution. Cassell. ISBN 0-3043-6726-5.
- James, William (2002) [1827]. The Naval History of Great Britain, Volume 1, 1793–1796. London: Conway Maritime Press. ISBN 0-85177-905-0.
- Mostert, Noel (2007). The Line upon a Wind: The Greatest War Fought at Sea Under Sail 1793 – 1815. Vintage Books. ISBN 9-78071-260-9272.
