= French ship Ça Ira (1781) =

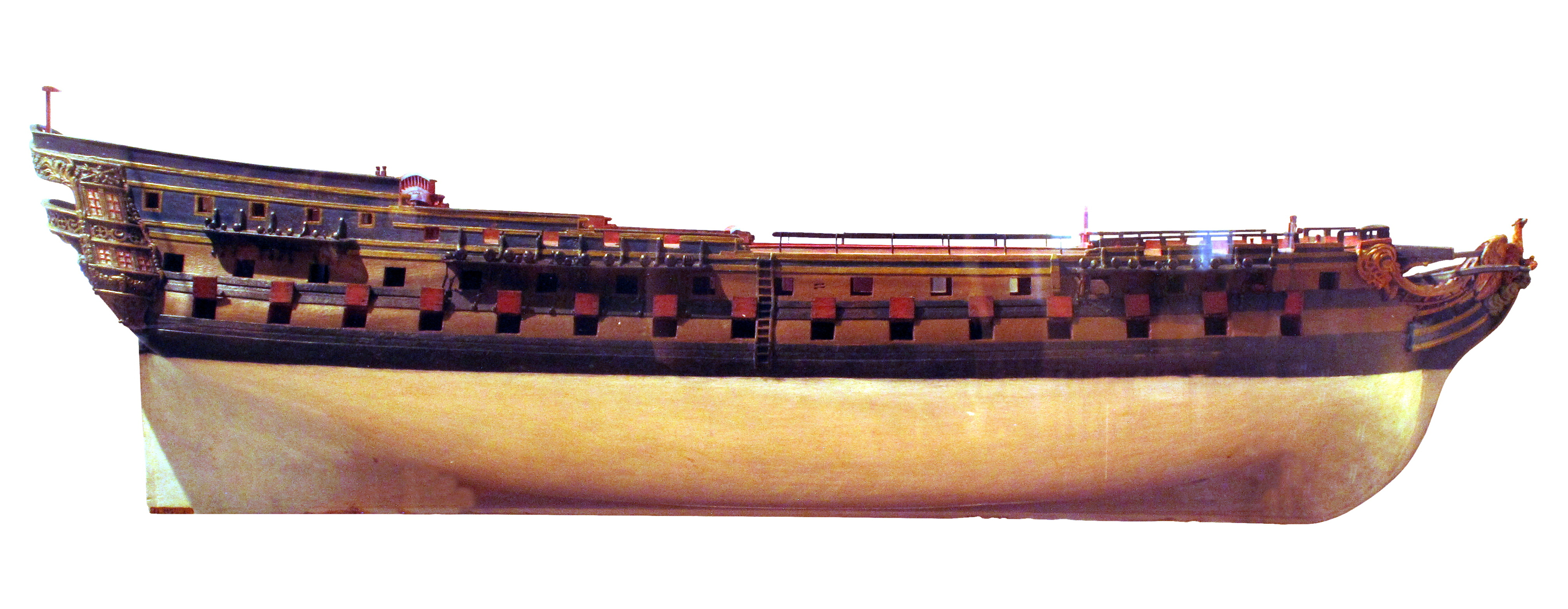
- Ship model of Couronne

History

France
- Name: Ça-Ira
- Builder: Arsenal of Brest
- Laid down: May 1781
- Launched: August 1781
- Christened: 1781 as Couronne
- Renamed: Renamed Ça-Ira in 1792
- Captured: Captured by the Royal Navy on 14 March 1795
- Fate: Burnt 1796

General characteristics
- Class & type: Saint-Esprit-class ship of the line
- Displacement: 3800 tonneaux
- Tons burthen: 2050 port tonneaux
- Length: 59.8 m (196 ft 2 in)
- Beam: 14.9 m (48 ft 11 in)
- Draught: 7.5 m (24 ft 7 in)
- Complement: 970
- Armament: 80 guns: 30 × 36-pounder long guns; 32 × 24-pounder long guns; 18 × 18-pounder long guns

Couronne was an 80-gun ship of the line of the French Navy.

== Career ==
Couronne was built at Brest, having been started in May 1781 and launched in August that year. She probably was built from the salvaged remains of her predecessor, Couronne (1768), which had been accidentally burnt at the dockyard in April 1781. She had a refit at Toulon in 1784.

=== French Revolution ===
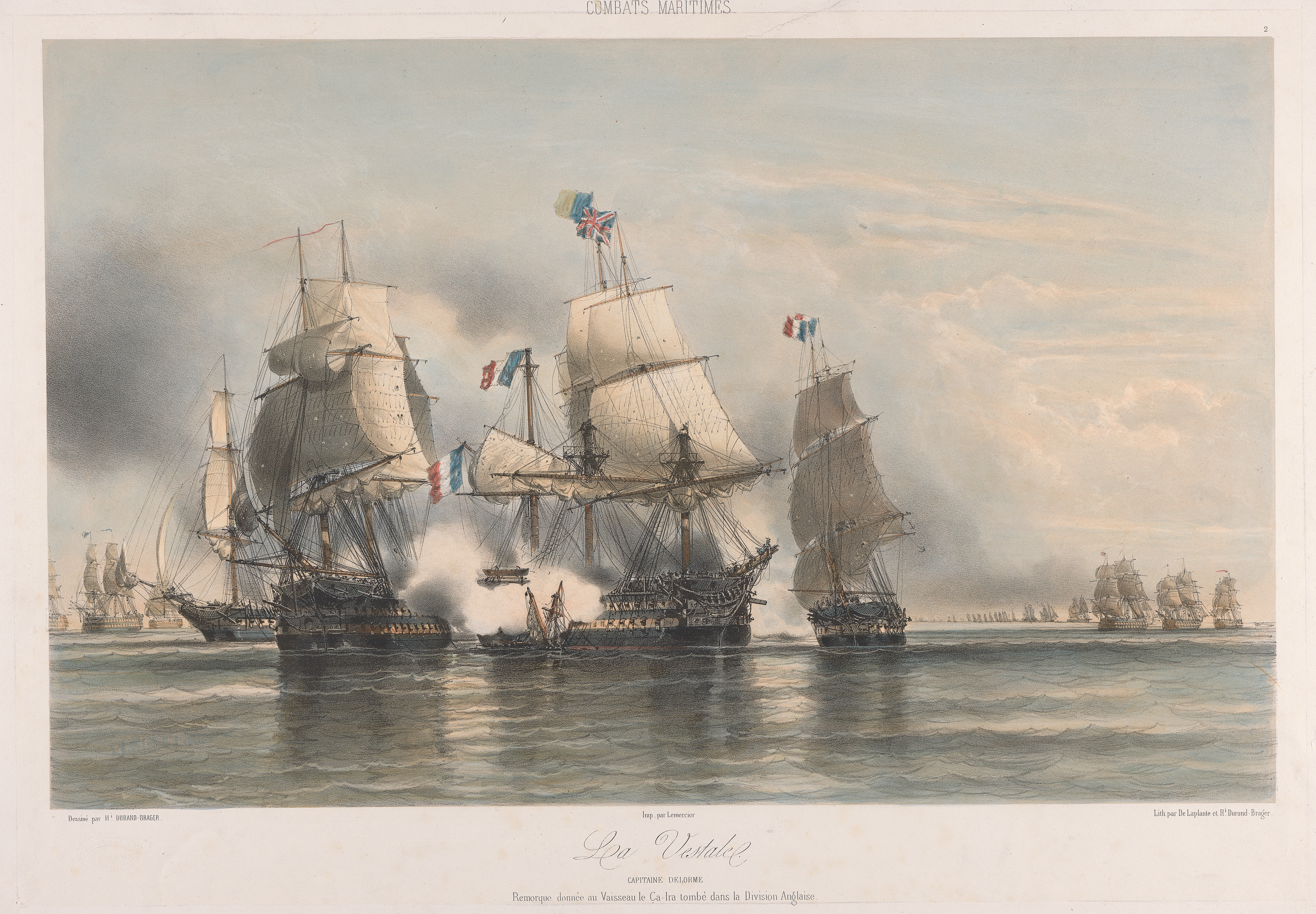
Ça Ira (center) at the Battle of Genoa on 14 March 1795

In 1792 she was renamed Ça Ira, in reference to the revolutionary anthem of the same name. On 14 March 1795, she took part in the Battle of Genoa under Captain Coudé, in which a French squadron, under Admiral Pierre Martin, was pursued off Alassio by a superior British fleet consisting of 15 ships of the line under Lord Hotham. During the chase, around 9:00, Ça Ira ran afoul of Victoire, losing her fore and main topmasts and falling back of the French squadron. The frigate HMS Inconstant under Captain Thomas Fremantle caught up and engaged Ça Ira; Vestale came to help, fired distant broadsides at Inconstant and took Ça Ira in tow. Ça Ira began a heavy fire on Inconstant which forced her to retreat. At 10:45, HMS Agamemnon under Captain Horatio Nelson caught up and opened fire, shortly aided by HMS Captain; the artillery duel continued for four hours until French ships came to support Ça Ira, compelling Agamemnon to retreat.

During the night, Vestale was relieved by the 74-gun Censeur in towing the now dismasted Ça Ira. In the morning, the British fleet had come in windward; HMS Captain caught up and engaged the two French ships, which battered her for 1 hour and 15 minutes, leaving her severely damaged, in distress, and eventually to be towed away from the action. HMS Bedford came to reinforce Captain, and had her rigging also severely damaged. The British fire had also reduced Ça Ira and Censeur to an almost helpless state. The main of the French fleet attempted to come to the rescue of her rear again and take advantage of the British vanguard's battered state, but the lack of wind, incompetent French gunnery, and resistance by HMS Illustrious and HMS Courageux prevented any effective action. Only Duquesne intervened, and had to retreat after she sustained damage and casualties. Ça Ira and Censeur tried to fight but due to a false manoeuvre Ça Ira collided with Censeur; her rigging fell on Censeur, stranding both ships. As a favourable wind built up, the French squadron retreated, leaving Censeur and Ça Ira without hope of rescue. Men from Agamemnon boarded Ça Ira and captured her. Reduced to hulks, the French ships eventually struck. They were taken into Spezia Bay.

=== Late career ===
Ça Ira was commissioned in the Royal Navy, but in too battered a state to serve, she was used as a hospital hulk in Saint-Florent.

Ça Ira was destroyed on 11 April 1796 in an accidental fire; boats from other ships attempted to aid, but as the fire became out of control, Ça Ira was evacuated and brought away from the anchorage. She drifted and ran aground half a mile to the northward of the citadel and burnt to the water line. An inquiry subsequently concluded that the fire had been accidentally put on by a "bottle of combustible matter improperly kept in the carpenters cabin", and acquitted the officers from blame.

== Archaeological discovery ==
In 1988, a 19th-century map was discovered, allowing the discovery of the wreck the following year, and its subsequent excavation. From 1990 to 1995, underwater archaeological survey was undertaken by Tech Sub, a non-profit organisation.
