= Francisco Balbi di Correggio =

Italian arquebusier (1505–1589)

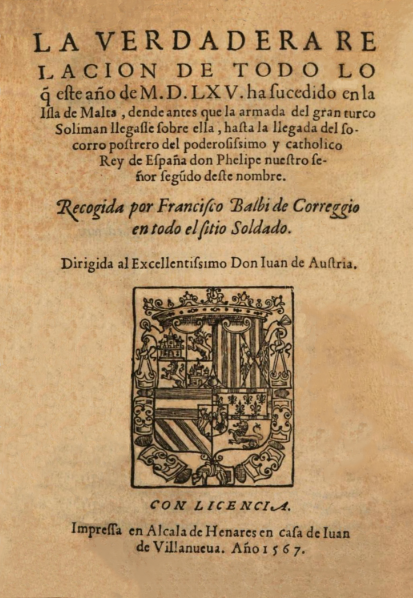
First edition of Balbi's account of the Siege of Malta, printed in Alcalá de Henares in 1567.

Francisco Balbi di Correggio (16 March 1505 – 12 December 1589), born in Correggio in the province of Reggio Emilia, Italy, was an arquebusier who served with the Spanish contingent during the Great Siege of Malta. Little is known about him other than that he maintained a journal throughout the siege, which he afterwards published.

Balbi's is the best-known eyewitness account of the siege (there is at least one other, in the form of a long poem by the knight Hipolito Sans), and all subsequent histories rely heavily upon it, including that of Giacomo Bosio, the official historian of the Knights of St. John, whose massive account first appeared in 1588.

Balbi's journal, apparently with some revisions after the fact, was first published in Spain in 1567. A second revised and extended edition was published in 1568. The first English translation appeared in 1961 by Henry A. Balbi. Another, less literal translation with some cuts was made by Ernle Bradford in 1965.
