= John Child Purvis =

Royal Navy Admiral (1747–1825)

Admiral John Child Purvis
- Born: 13 March 1747; Norfolk
- Died: 1825 (aged 77–78); Lymington, Hampshire
- Military career
- Allegiance: Kingdom of Great Britain (to 1800); United Kingdom (from 1801)
- Branch: Royal Navy
- Service years: 1778–1825
- Rank: Admiral
- Conflicts: American Revolutionary War; French Revolutionary Wars; Siege of Toulon; Invasion of Corsica; Battle of Genoa; Battle of the Hyères Islands; Napoleonic Wars

Admiral John Child Purvis (13 March 1747 – 1825) was a British Royal Navy officer of the late eighteenth and early nineteenth century best known for his service with the British Mediterranean Fleet during the French Revolutionary and Napoleonic Wars. Coming from a naval family, Purvis first saw action in small ships during the American Revolutionary War, later commanding a ship of the line with the Mediterranean Fleet during 1793–1796. During this period he fought in several significant battles against the French. He then served with the Channel Fleet operating at the blockade of Brest and in the Napoleonic Wars was promoted and tasked with maintaining the blockade of Cádiz. After the outbreak of the Peninsular War, Purvis was active in preventing the French capture of Cádiz and at one stage destroyed the city's seaward defences. He retired post-war to his home in Hampshire.

== Life ==
Purvis was born into a prominent naval family on 13 March 1747, the second son of George Purvis, the secretary to the Sick and Wounded Board, and his wife Mary Oadham. He was the grandson of Captain George Purvis of Darsham, Suffolk, MP for Aldeburgh and comptroller of the navy in the 1730s. He was the brother of Captain Richard Purvis who died in May 1802, and of George Purvis, who served as secretary to Admiral Lord Howe and later to Admiral the Earl of St. Vincent in the Mediterranean. Purvis joined the Royal Navy at a young age, and by 1778 he was a lieutenant on first HMS Invincible and then HMS Britannia during the American Revolutionary War. In 1782 he was promoted to commander and sailed off Cape Henry in the 16-gun HMS Duc de Chartres. On 19 August Purvis encountered the 22-gun corvette Aigle, capturing the French ship after a fierce engagement. For this victory, he was promoted to Post Captain, although the end of the war soon afterwards limited his opportunities for service.

He was recalled at the outbreak of the French Revolutionary Wars in 1793 and give command of first the frigate HMS Amphitrite and then the flagship of Rear-Admiral Samuel Goodall, HMS Princess Royal, in which he sailed for the Mediterranean. Princess Royal was heavily engaged at the Siege of Toulon later in the year, and following the withdrawal Purvis assisted the British forces during the invasion of Corsica, seeing action at the Siege of Bastia and the Siege of Calvi. The following year he was with the fleet which fought at the Battle of Genoa and Battle of the Hyères Islands and inflicted minor defeats on the French Mediterranean Fleet during the blockade of Toulon.

At the withdrawal from the Mediterranean in late 1796, Princess Royal was paid off and Purvis given command of the 98-gun ship of the line HMS London with the Channel Fleet, serving at the blockade of Brest. In 1801 he moved to the 100-gun HMS Royal George and briefly returned to shore at the Peace of Amiens. In 1803 he returned to service once more in the Napoleonic Wars, and spent a year in command of HMS Dreadnought until promoted to Rear-Admiral in 1804. In 1806 in this position he was sent to serve with the Mediterranean Fleet once more, commanding the blockade of the Spanish port of Cádiz.

Following the outbreak of the Peninsular War in 1808, Purvis led his squadron into Cádiz harbour to secure the Spanish fleet from capture by the advancing French and at one point deliberately destroyed the seaward defences of the port when it seemed likely that the French would overwhelm the landward defences. Ultimately however the French were unable to take the city. Purvis was present at Cádiz in 1810, when a storm blew several Spanish and Portuguese ships ashore where they were destroyed by French artillery fire.

Purvis later retired ashore and became a Commissioner of the Navy Board. He married three times, first in 1784 to Catherine Sowers with whom he had two children. Secondly in 1790 to Mary Longhurst Garrett, with one son; his wife died in 1798. Finally he married Elizabeth Dickson, daughter of Sir Archibald Dickson, who survived him. He was promoted to Admiral of the Blue, and died at home at Lymington, Hampshire in the summer of 1825.
