= HMS Inconstant (1783) =

Frigate of the Royal Navy

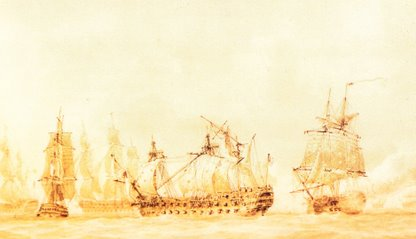
- HMS Inconstant (left) fighting Ça Ira

History

Great Britain
- Name: HMS Inconstant
- Ordered: 8 December 1781
- Builder: William Barnard, Deptford
- Laid down: December 1782
- Launched: 28 October 1783
- Honours and awards: Naval General Service Medal with clasp "Egypt"
- Fate: Broken up in November 1817

General characteristics
- Class & type: 36-gun Perseverance-class fifth rate
- Tons burthen: 890 (bm)
- Length: 137 ft 9 in (41.99 m)
- Beam: 38 ft 3 in (11.66 m)
- Draught: 9 ft 6 in (2.90 m)
- Propulsion: Sails
- Sail plan: Full-rigged ship
- Complement: 260 (270 from 25 April 1780)
- Armament: Upper gundeck: 26 × 18-pounder guns; QD: 8 × 9-pounder guns + 4 × 18-pounder carronades; Fc: 2 × 9-pounder guns + 4 × 18-pounder carronades; 14 × 1/2-pdr swivels

HMS Inconstant was a 36-gun Perseverance-class fifth-rate frigate of the Royal Navy. She had a successful career serving in the French Revolutionary and Napoleonic Wars, capturing three French warships during the French Revolutionary naval campaigns, Curieux, Unité, and the former British ship HMS Speedy.

== Construction and commissioning ==
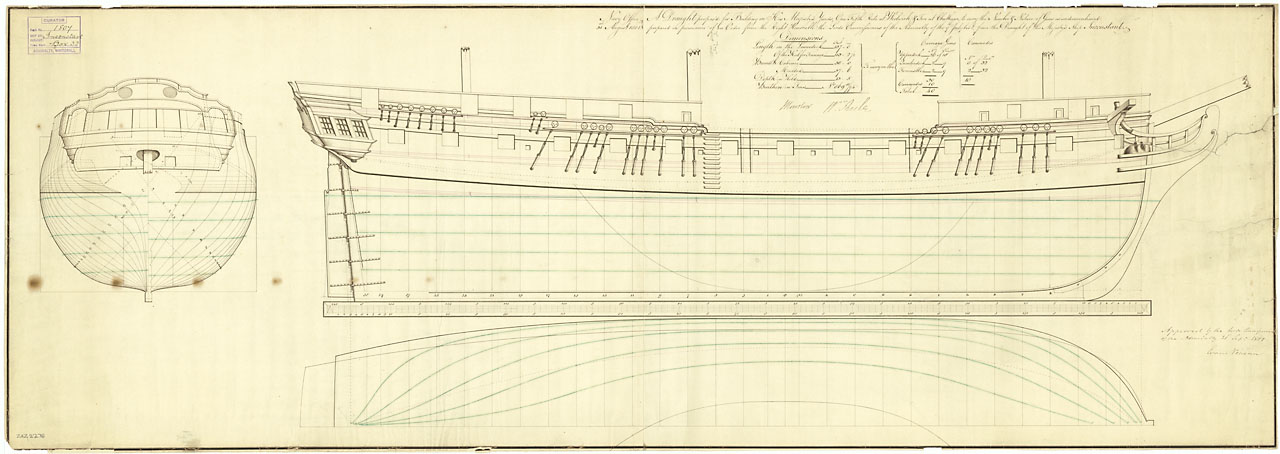
Plan of Inconstant

Inconstant was ordered on 8 December 1781 and laid down at the yards of William Barnard, Deptford, in December 1782. She was launched on 28 October 1783, and was immediately fitted out for ordinary, a process completed by 22 March 1784. She was moved to Woolwich in October 1788 and there fitted out for sea between June and November 1790. She had cost a total of £16,226.0.1d (including the work to fit her for ordinary, with a further £6,627 spent in 1790 to prepare her for sea.

== Career ==
Inconstant was commissioned in August 1790 under Captain George Wilson. Wilson commanded her for just over a year before she was paid off in September 1791.

=== French Revolutionary wars ===
Inconstant returned to Woolwich and was fitted out again between January and February 1793 at a cost of £7,239. She was recommissioned under Captain Augustus Montgomery and joined the fleet under Richard Howe. She sailed to the West Indies in April, and captured the 14-gun Curieux there on 3 June 1793.

Inconstant returned to England in July that year, sailing again in November bound for Toulon to join Samuel Hood's fleet. She was briefly commanded by Captain George Cockburn in 1794, who was succeeded by Thomas Fremantle in January 1795. Under Fremantle, and as part of the fleet under Admiral William Hotham, she fought against the 80-gun ship of the line Ça Ira on 10 March 1795. Ça Ira's superiority in firepower soon forced Fremantle to fall back. As he did so, HMS Agamemnon, commanded by Captain Horatio Nelson, surged past to continue the fight. This was a prelude to the Naval Battle of Genoa, fought over the next few days.

On 25 March Inconstant recaptured HMS Speedy from the French, and went on to form part of Nelson's squadron in August. On 20 April 1796 she captured the French Unité. Unité was taken into service as HMS Surprise. Inconstant was then present at the evacuation of Leghorn on 26 June 1796. On 5 February, 1797 she and HMS Blanche captured American merchantman "Fortune" 4 leagues off Marseilles bound for to Genoa. She was seized for suspected trading with France and suspicious papers. After an active period in the Mediterranean, she was paid off in September 1797. She was refitted at Woolwich between March and June 1798, returning to service as a 20-gun troopship. She was commanded by Commander Milham Ponsonby until being paid off in October 1799, after which she was refitted and recommissioned as a fifth-rate under Commander John Ayscough. Inconstant was initially operating in the North Sea, before receiving orders to move to support operations in Egypt in 1801. Because Inconstant served in the navy's Egyptian campaign (8 March to 8 September 1801), her officers and crew qualified for the clasp "Egypt" to the Naval General Service Medal that the Admiralty authorised in 1850 for all surviving claimants. (Note: A first-class share of the prize money awarded in April 1823 was worth £34 2s 4d; a fifth-class share, that of a seaman, was worth 3s 11½d. The amount was small as the total had to be shared between 79 vessels and the entire army contingent.)

She came under the command of captain Richard Byron in October 1802, who was succeeded by Captain Edward Dickson by December.

=== Napoleonic Wars ===
Inconstant was fitted out as a troopship again in late 1803, and was present at the capture of Gorée in March 1804. She was restored to a frigate between 1805 and 1806, and spent the period between 1806 and 1808 as the flagship of Vice-Admiral James Saumarez.

On 6 May 1807 the boats of Inconstant captured the French ship Julia. Albacore and Jamaica shared in the proceeds of the capture.

Inconstant underwent a large repair between 1808 and 1809, after which she sailed to the Cape of Good Hope. She was paid off in 1810, and refitted at Portsmouth. She recommissioned again in October that year, under the command of Captain John Quilliam, who was succeeded by Captain Edward Owen by December. Owen remained in command until 1812, and was succeeded by Sir Edward Tucker. On 19 December 1812 HMS Rolla recaptured the whaler Frederick. Rolla shared the salvage money for Frederick with HMS Dublin and Inconstant.

Tucker sailed Inconstant to South America.

On 18 March 1815, Inconstant and Albacore recaptured Acorn and her cargo.

In August 1815 Inconstant was serving as Captain James Lucas Yeo's flagship.

== Fate ==
HMS Inconstant was broken up at Portsmouth in November 1817.
