= Pierre Martin (French Navy officer) =

French Navy officer

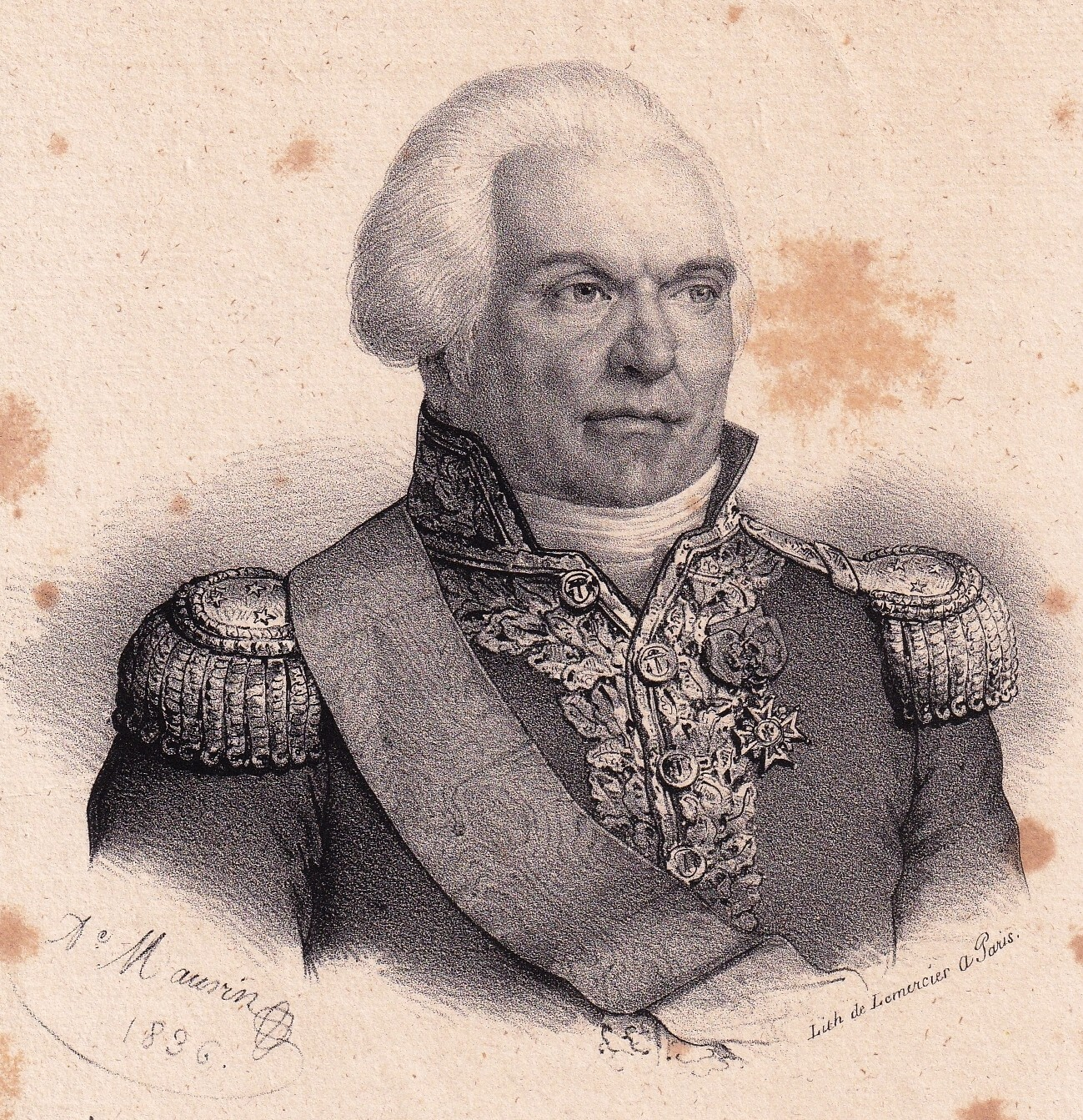
- Portrait by Antoine Maurin, 1836
- Born: 29 January 1752; Louisbourg, New France
- Died: November 1, 1820 (aged 68); Rochefort, France
- Military career
- Allegiance: Kingdom of France; French First Republic; First French Empire
- Branch: French Navy; French Imperial Navy
- Service years: –1820
- Rank: Vice admiral
- Conflicts: American Revolutionary War; Battle of Ushant (1778); Battle of Grenada; Battle of Martinique (1779) (WIA); Siege of Savannah (1779); French Revolutionary Wars; Battle of Genoa (1795); Battle of the Hyères Islands; Napoleonic Wars
- Awards: Grand officer of the legion of Honour (1804) Knight of Saint Louis (1791) Name inscribed on the Arc de Triomphe

Vice-Admiral Pierre, comte Martin (29 January 1752 – 1 November 1820) was a French Navy officer who served in the American Revolutionary War and the French Revolutionary and Napoleonic Wars.

== Biography ==
=== Youth ===
Pierre Martin was born to a Canadian family of Louisbourg. In 1759, his family fled to Rochefort after Louisbourg was captured by British forces during the Seven Years' War.

Martin served as an apprentice on the fluit Saint Esprit. He received instructions in hydrography and became an aspiring pilot in 1769. He sailed to the Indian Ocean. In 1775, serving aboard the frigate Terpsichore, he lost an eye in an accident.

On 2 February 1776, he married Magdelaine Schimellé. A daughter, Marguerite, was born within the year.

=== American War of Independence ===
Martin served on the Magnifique as a pilot, and took part in the Battle of Ushant, the Battle of Grenada, the Battle of Martinique, where he was wounded, and the Siege of Savannah.

In 1781, he served aboard the Cérès, in Vaudreuil's squadron. In 1782, he became an officier bleu, being fast-tracked for a career as a reserve Navy officer.

After the Treaty of Paris, Martin stayed with the royal navy and served on a variety of ships in the Caraibs. In 1785, he received command of the corvette Rossignol, and of the Cousine, based in Senegal, between 1786 and 1791.

In 1788, reforms of the Navy initiated by Marshal Castries allowed him to be promoted to sub-lieutenant.

=== Revolutionary wars ===
In 1792, Martin was promoted to lieutenant and given command of the corvette Espoir, off Senegal.

The next year, he was promoted to captain and given command of the frigate Hermione, patrolling the French shores to fend off privateers. He stationed for three months at the entrance of the Loire river to support Republican troops against the Royalists during the War in the Vendée. In September, Hermione ran aground and was destroyed off Le Croisic, due to an error by a local pilot. Martin was court-martialled for the loss of his ship, and found innocent of any wrongdoing.

In November 1793, Martin rose to contre-amiral. In early 1794, he was given chief command of the Toulon squadron, with his flag on the Sans Culotte. The squadron, initially 7-ship of the line-strong, with four frigates and one corvette, participated in the cruise of June 1794 was soon joined by eight ships from Brest. Martin complained of the low quality of his ill-trained crews who were recruited to make up for those lost as a result of the siege of Toulon.

In 1795, his squadron captured Berwick, and fought the Battle of Genoa against Hotham's fleet. In July, another clash between the two fleets resulted in the Battle of the Hyères Islands.

With most of his forces blockaded in Toulon harbour, Martin launched numerous small squadrons for limited raids. Martin was promoted to vice-admiral in March 1796 and relieved by Brueys.

=== Préfet maritime ===
Martin was put in charge of the forces in Rochefort, and became préfet maritime when the charge was founded in 1801, until 1809. When Latouche-Tréville died in 1804, numerous officier petitioned for him to be put in charge of the Mediterranean fleet.

In April 1809, Allemand's insufficiently strong defensive positions gave Admiral Gambier an opportunity for a strike, leading to the Battle of the Basque Roads. The resulting loss of four ships and two frigates was blamed on captains, four of whom were court-martialed with one relieved of duty and one, Laffon, of Calcutta, executed by firing squad, but Allemand's role was never questioned, much to the outrage of the officers. Martin openly expressed his disapproval of the verdict.

Martin fell out of favour and was kept away from responsibilities until the end of the Empire. He retired in 1814, though he was reintegrated during the Hundred Days. The Bourbon Restauration considered him to be compromised with Napoleon, as he had attempted to communicate plans for an evasion to America. Nevertheless, in 1817, he was confirmed as a Count by Louis XVIII.

Martin died in 1820. His epitaph reads:

Bystander, here lies a man of good

He protected the oppressed, helped the poor
May he lie in peace at the source of happiness

As promised by his virtues.

== Honours ==
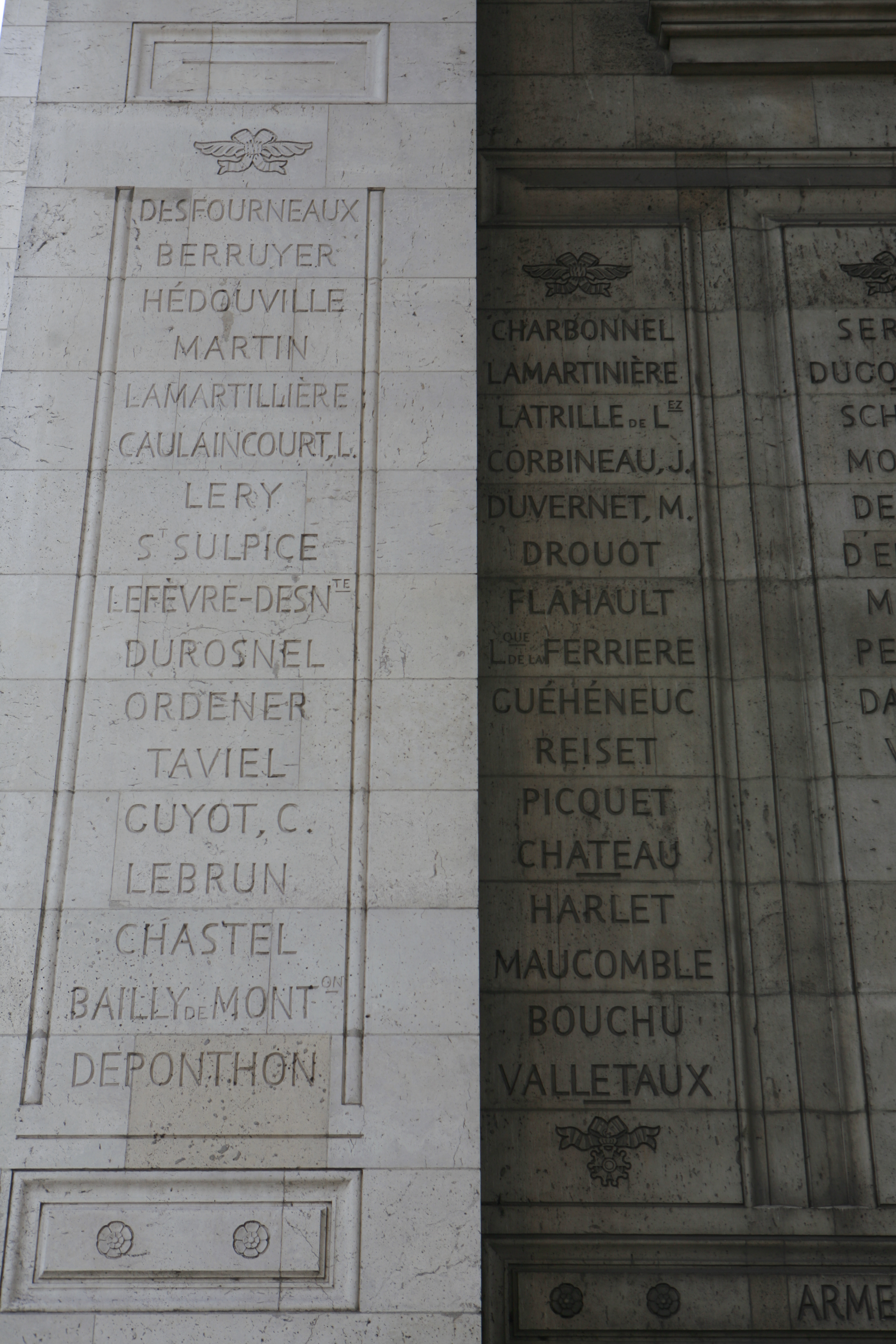
Martin's name on the Western pillar of the Arc de Triomphe (fourth from the top)

- Grand officer of the legion of Honour (1804)
- Knight of Saint Louis (1791)
