= Ernle Bradford =

British writer (1922–1986)

Ernle Dusgate Selby Bradford
- Born: 11 January 1922; Cole Green, Norfolk, England
- Died: 8 May 1986 (aged 64); Kalkara, Malta
- Education: Uppingham School
- Known for: Author, historian and sailor

Ernle Dusgate Selby Bradford (11 January 1922 – 8 May 1986) was a noted 20th-century British historian specializing in the Mediterranean world and naval topics. He was also an authority on antique jewellery and was the founder editor of the Antique Dealers and Collector's Guide.

== Life ==
Bradford was the son of Jocelyn Ernle Sydney Patton Bradford MBE MC, and his wife, Ada Louise Dusgate. He was born in Cole Green, Norfolk and educated in England at Uppingham School. He served in the Royal Navy during World War II, eventually becoming first lieutenant of a destroyer.

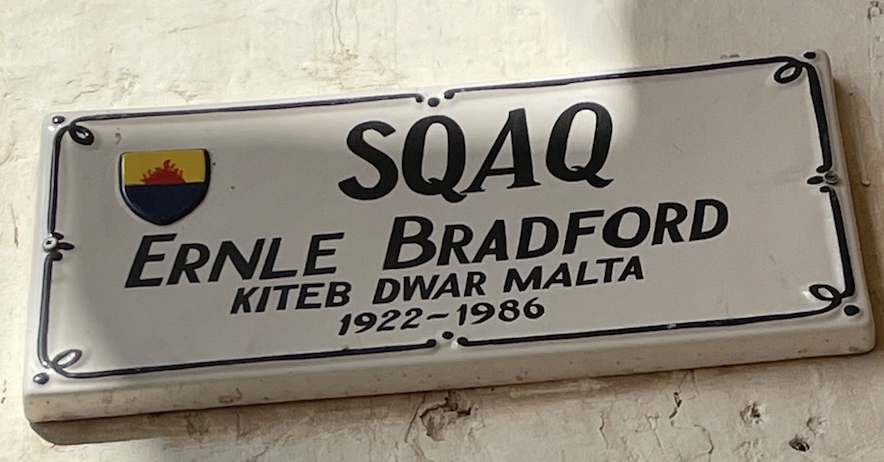
Street in Kalkara, Malta, named after Bradford

A keen yachtsman himself, Bradford spent almost 30 years sailing the Mediterranean, and many of his books are set there. His book, The Journeying Moon describes some of these voyages. It ends with the sale of his Bristol Channel Pilot Cutter, Mischief, to HW Bill Tilman, who made a number of significant voyages in it to high latitudes.

A sometime BBC broadcaster and magazine editor, Bradford was also a prolific author and popular historian, many of his books remaining in print to this day. He regularly wrote letters to the British press, in particular The Times and Country Life, on matters of history and sailing.

Bradford lived in Kalkara, on Malta for a number of years, this also being where he died, and where a commemorative marble plaque exists to his memory and a street next to his old home is named after him.

== List of works ==
- Contemporary Jewellery and Silver Design (Heywood & Co., 1950).
- Four Centuries of European Jewellery (Country Life, 1953).
- The Journeying Moon (Jarrolds, 1958); reprinted as: The Journeying Moon: Sailing into History.
- English Victorian Jewellery (Country Life, 1959).
- The Mighty Hood: The Life and Death of the Royal Navy's Proudest Ship (Hodder & Stoughton, 1959).
- The Wind Off the Island (Hutchinson, 1960); reprinted as: The Wind off the Island: A Portrait of Sicily and Life on the Mediterranean Sea.
- US title: A Wind from the North: The Life of Henry the Navigator (Harcourt Brace, 1960); UK title: Southward the Caravels: The Story of Henry the Navigator (Hutchinson, 1961).
- The Great Siege: Malta 1565 (Hodder & Stoughton, 1961); US title: The Great Siege (Harcourt Brace, 1961).
- The Touchstone (Cassell, 1962).
- Ulysses Found (Hodder & Stoughton, 1963).
- The Companion Guide to the Greek Isles (Collins, 1963), reprinted many times.
- Three Centuries of Sailing (Country Life, 1964).
- The America's Cup (Country Life, 1964).
- Drake. A Biography (Hodder & Stoughton, 1965); US edition: The Wind Commands Me: A Life of Sir Francis Drake (Harcourt, 1965); subsequently reprinted as Drake: England's Greatest Seafarer.
- (Editor) The Siege of Malta 1565: Translated from the Spanish Edition of 1568 by Francisco Balbi di Correggio (Folio Society, 1965); reprinted by the Boydell Press, 2011.
- Wall of England: The Channel's 2000 Years of History (Country Life, 1966); USA: Wall of Empire: The English Channel (Barnes, 1966).
- The Great Betrayal: Constantinople 1204 (Hodder & Stoughton, 1967); USA: The Sundered Cross: The Story of the Fourth Crusade (Prentice Hall, 1967).
- The Sultan's Admiral: The Life of Barbarossa (USA: Harcourt Brace, 1968; UK: Hodder & Stoughton, 1969).
- Teach Yourself Antique Furniture (English Universities Press, 1970).
- Mediterranean: Portrait of a Sea (Hodder & Stoughton, 1971).
- Gibraltar: The History of a Fortress (Hart-Davis, 1971).
- Cleopatra (Hodder & Stoughton, 1971).
- The Shield and the Sword: The Knights of Malta (HarperCollins, 1972); US edition: The Shield and the Sword: The Knights of St. John, Jerusalem, Rhodes and Malta (Dutton, 1973); republished: The Knights of the Order (Dorset, 1991)
- Christopher Columbus (Michael Joseph, 1973).
- The Sword and the Scimitar: The Saga of the Crusades (Victor Gollancz, 1974).
- Paul the Traveller: Saint Paul and his World (Allen Lane, 1974).
- Nelson: The Essential Hero (Macmillan, 1977).
- The Year of Thermopylae (Macmillan, 1980); also published as: Thermopylae: The Battle for the West.
- Hannibal (Macmillan, 1981); republished by The Folio Society (1996), with an introduction by Kenneth McLeish.
- The Story of the Mary Rose (Hamish Hamilton, 1982).
- Julius Caesar: The Pursuit of Power (Hamish Hamilton, 1984).
- Siege: Malta 1940-1943 (Hamish Hamilton, 1985).
- The Great Ship (Hamish Hamilton, 1986); reprinted as: The Great Ship: How Battleships Changed the History of War.
