= Geoffrey Bennett (historian) =

British naval officer and novelist (1909–1983)

Captain Geoffrey Martin Bennett DSC FRHS (7 June 1909 – 5 September 1983) was a British Royal Navy officer and author.

== Career ==
Geoffrey Bennett was born in 1909 into a naval family, the son of Paymaster Rear-Admiral Martin Gilbert Bennett, OBE. He attended the Royal Naval College, Dartmouth, and entered the service. After his promotion to Lieutenant he qualified as a signals specialist. He became Flag Lieutenant to a number of admirals. In World War II he was first in Freetown, Sierra Leone, and then served as signals officer Force H in the Mediterranean where he earned the Distinguished Service Cross.

In 1932 he married Rosemary Bechervaise, always known as "Bud", the daughter of a Portsmouth solicitor whose family originated in Jersey. They had two sons, but after the war Rosemary had a serious mental breakdown which was to recur at intervals for the rest of her life.

Bennett was promoted to Commander at the end of World War II. He captained HMS St Brides Bay in the Mediterranean, and then served in the Admiralty at Bath. He was promoted to Captain at the beginning of 1953, and spent two years as naval attaché in Moscow, also covering Warsaw and Helsinki where he alerted the Admiralty to the potential growth of the Soviet Navy. Retiring soon after his return to Britain, he joined the household of the Lord Mayor of London. In 1960 he became Secretary to the Lord Mayor of Westminster, where he became an authority on civic protocol.

== Writing ==
Bennett always wrote, and was awarded the Royal United Services Institution gold medal for an essay three times. At the end of World War II he published his first novel Phantom Fleet, a naval yarn, under the pseudonym "Sea Lion": as a serving officer he could not use his own name.

Over the next two decades he produced about twenty such novels for both adults and children. He also wrote a number of radio plays for the BBC, including several serials for Children's Hour which featured the adventures of two midshipmen, "Tiger" Ransome and "Snort" Kenton. His novels included This Creeping Evil, an allegory; The Diamond Rock, which was set in the Caribbean near Martinique during the Napoleonic Wars and was based on a true incident; and The Quest of John Clare, about a family cursed over generations.

After retiring he took to naval history. He published studies of the main battles of both world wars and Nelson; a biography of Admiral Lord Charles Beresford, Charlie B; and Cowan's War, an account of the British campaign in the Baltic (1918–19) under Admiral Sir Walter Cowan, which successfully thwarted Soviet Russia from seizing control of the three Baltic states, Estonia, Latvia and Lithuania. He was elected a fellow of the Royal Historical Society.

He was passionately fond of the theatre and music. On his return from the Soviet Union he gave two long talks on the BBC Third Programme on the Bolshoi Ballet, which he had had opportunity to see in Moscow before they were well known outside the Soviet Union.

== Retirement ==
Following his retirement, Bennett lived in Ludlow, Shropshire, in a 17th-century cottage opposite a hotel where Nelson had once stayed. At the end of the 20th century there was renewed interest in his histories and most have been republished. Cowan's War was retitled Freeing the Baltic and has been translated into Estonian and Latvian. Charlie B has never been republished: it remains rare because the original publisher went out of business, and most copies were pulped.

Bennett died in 1983. His wife, despite her health problems, outlived him by five years, dying in 1988. His ashes are buried in the churchyard of St Laurence's Church, Ludlow.

Details of his career may be found in Who Was Who, and obituaries appeared in The Times and Daily Telegraph. A collection of his papers relating to his writing career is held by the Caird Library at the National Maritime Museum in Greenwich, numbered MS 85/098 and MS 85/132.

== Partial bibliography (histories) ==
- By Human Error: disasters of a century. London: Seeley, Service. 1961. OCLC 11054915.
- Coronel and the Falklands. London: Batsford. 1962. OCLC 2599653.
- Cowan's War: the story of British naval operations in the Baltic, 1918–1920. London: Collins. 1964. OCLC 51700397.
  - Republished as: —. (2001). Freeing the Baltic. Edinburgh: Birlinn. ISBN 1-84341-001-X
  - Also translated into Estonian and Latvian.
- The Battle of Jutland. Philadelphia: Dufour Editions. 1964. OCLC 3507765.
  - Also translated into German as Die Skagerrakschlacht
  - Also translated into Polish as Jutlandia 1916. Bitwa morska
- Charlie B: a biography of Admiral Lord Beresford of Metemmeh and Curraghmore, G.C.B., G.C.V.O., LL. D., D.C.L. London: Dawnay. 1968. OCLC 460841. (Copies of this are rare, as the original publisher went out of business shortly after publication and it has not been republished).
- Naval Battles of the First World War. New York: Scribner. 1969. OCLC 218534.
- Naval Battles of World War II. New York: D. Mckay. 1975. ISBN 0-679-50581-4.
- Nelson, the Commander. New York: Scribner. 1972. ISBN 0-684-12886-1.
- The Battle of Trafalgar. Annapolis, Maryland: Naval Institute Press. 1977. ISBN 0-87021-914-6.
