= HMS Illustrious (1789) =

74-gun Royal Navy ship of the line

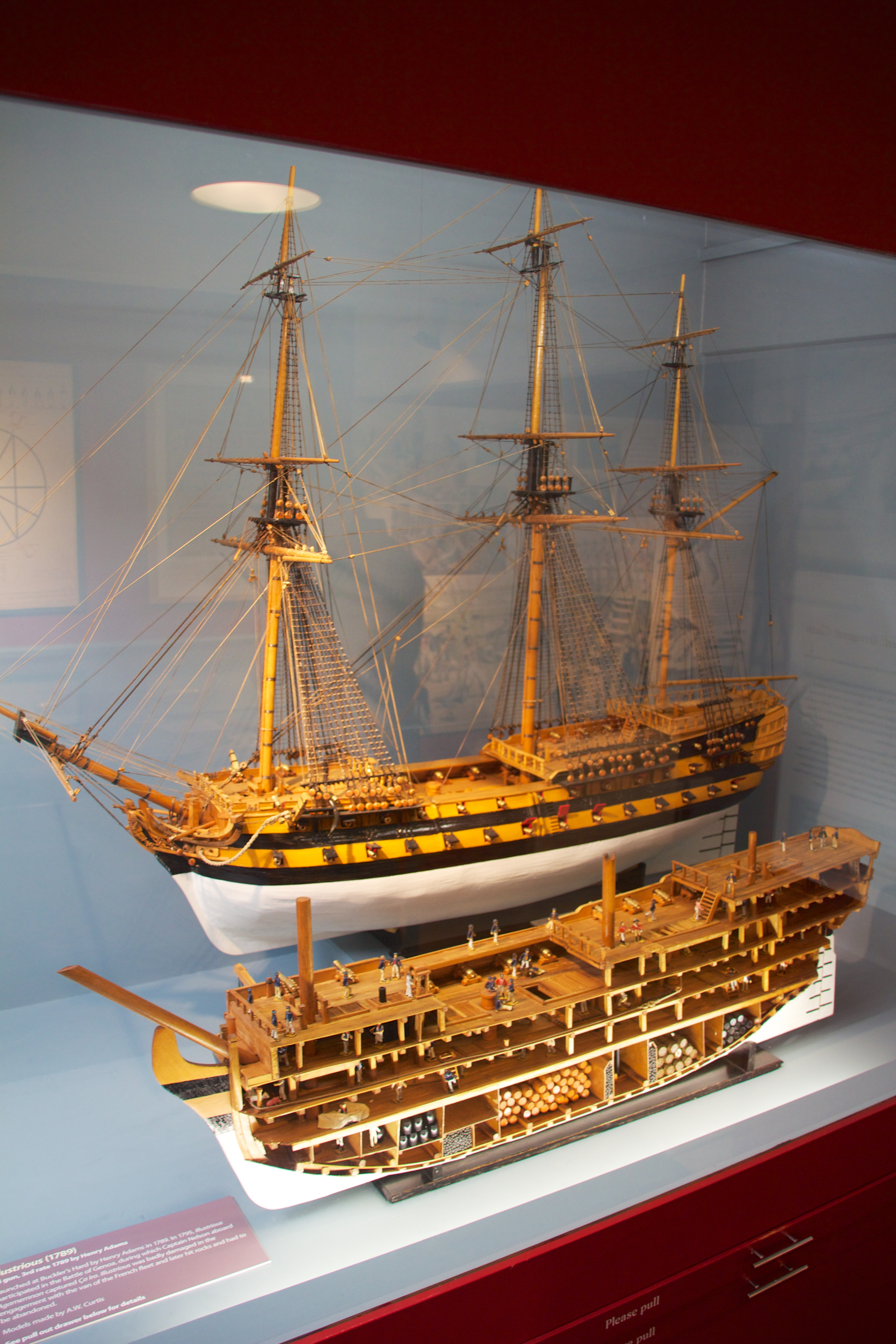
- Model of HMS Illustrious at Buckler's Hard

History

Great Britain
- Name: Illustrious
- Ordered: 31 December 1781
- Builder: Henry Adams, Buckler's Hard
- Laid down: September 1784
- Launched: 7 July 1789
- Commissioned: May 1790
- Fate: Wrecked, 18 March 1795 and subsequently burnt

General characteristics
- Class & type: Arrogant-class ship of the line
- Tons burthen: 1,615 51/94 (bm)
- Length: 168 ft 2 in (51.3 m) (gundeck)
- Beam: 46 ft 11 in (14.3 m)
- Draught: 17 ft 6 in (5.3 m) (light)
- Depth of hold: 19 ft 9 in (6.0 m)
- Propulsion: Sails
- Sail plan: Full-rigged ship
- Complement: 600
- Armament: 74 muzzle-loading, smoothbore guns: Lower gundeck: 28 × 32 pdr guns; Upper gundeck: 28 × 18 pdr guns; Forecastle: 4 × 9 pdr guns; Quarter deck: 14 × 9 pdr guns

HMS Illustrious was a 74-gun third rate Arrogant-class ship of the line built for the Royal Navy during the 1780s. Completed in 1790, she played a minor role in the French Revolutionary Wars. She participated in the Siege of Toulon in 1793 and the Battle of Genoa two years later. Badly damaged during the battle, she was blown ashore during a storm and subsequently burnt.

== Description ==
The Arrogant-class ship of the line was designed by Sir Thomas Slade, co-Surveyor of the Navy. It was one of the "common" type of 74 with lighter guns than those of the "large" classes. Illustrious was one of the slightly modified second batch of Arrogants. She measured 168 feet 2 inches (51.3 m) on the gundeck and 137 feet 10 inches (42.0 m) on the keel. She had a beam of 46 feet 11 inches (14.3 m), a depth of hold of 19 feet 9 inches (6.0 m) and had a tonnage of 1,615 51/94 tons burthen. The ship's draught was 12 feet 6 inches (4 m) forward and 17 feet 6 inches (5.3 m) aft at light load; fully loaded, her draught would be significantly deeper. The ships' crew numbered 600 officers and ratings. They were fitted with three masts and were ship-rigged.

The ships were armed with 74 muzzle-loading, smoothbore guns that consisted of twenty-eight 32-pounder guns on their lower gundeck and twenty-eight 18-pounder guns on their upper deck. Their forecastle mounted four 9-pounder guns. On their quarterdeck they carried fourteen 9-pounder guns.

== Construction and career ==
Illustrious was the first ship of her name to serve in the Royal Navy. She was ordered on 31 December 1781 and was laid down by Henry Adams at his shipyard in Buckler's Hard in September 1784. The ship was launched on 7 July 1789 and was commissioned by Captain Alexander Edgar in May 1790. Illustrious was completed at Portsmouth Dockyard on 18 June. Captain Charles Pole assumed command in March 1791 and the ship was paid off in September. She was recommissioned by Captain Thomas Frederick in January 1793 and was assigned to the Mediterranean Fleet on 22 April. Beginning in August, Illustrious was involved in the Siege of Toulon.

On 13–14 March 1795, she participated in the Battle of Genoa. Illustrious was badly damaged in the engagement with the 80-gun second rates Victoire and Tonnant and the 74-gun Duquesne, losing both her main and mizzenmasts and her rigging wrecked. Twenty men of her crew were killed and seventy more were wounded. After the battle, the frigate Meleager was towing Illustrious when she broke free of her tow during a violent storm during the night of 17/18 March. Then the accidental firing of a lower-deck gun destroyed its gun port so that water briefly poured in. She attempted to anchor in Valence Bay (between Spezia and Leghorn) to ride out the bad weather that had descended upon her. On 18 March her anchor cables broke, however, and she struck on rocks and had to be abandoned although all her crew were rescued. Efforts over the next three days to refloat the ship were unsuccessful. The frigate Lowestoffe and the brig Tarleton took off her stores, and her wreck was set on fire on 28 March.
