= Bernard Ireland =

British naval engineer and editor

Bernard Ireland was a British naval engineer, editor of Jane's and writer on naval matters.

== Life ==
Ireland was educated at the Royal Dockyard School, Portsmouth, and the University of Southampton.

Ireland worked for the Defence Research Agency in ship research. He wrote or coauthored 47 books, as well as contributing to journals and partworks on subjects related to ships and naval campaigns.

Ireland was married and had two children. He died on 8 February 2019.

== Bibliography ==
- Warships of the world: major classes. London: Ian Allan, 1976. ISBN 0-711-00687-3
- Warships: from sail to the nuclear age. London: Hamlyn, 1978. ISBN 0-600-39397-6
- The rise and fall of the aircraft carrier. London: Marshall Cavendish, 1979. ISBN 0-856-85711-4
- Warships of the world: escort vessels. London: Ian Allan, 1979. ISBN 0-711-00896-5
- Warships of the world: submarines & fast attack craft. London: Ian Allan, 1980. ISBN 0-711-00976-7
- Cruisers. London: Hamlyn, 1981. ISBN 0-600-32127-4
- Navies of the West. New York: Hippocrene Books, 1984. ISBN 0-882-54977-4
- Warship construction. London: Ian Allan, 1987. ISBN 0-711-01594-5
- Sea power 2000. London: Arms and Armour, 1990. ISBN 0-853-68979-2
- The War in the Mediterranean 1940-1943. London: Arms and Armour, 1993. ISBN 1-854-09070-4
- Jane's Battleships of the 20th Century. New York: HarperCollins, 1996. ISBN 0-004-70997-7
- Warships of World War II. Glasgow: HarperCollins, 1996. ISBN 0-004-70872-5
- Jane's War at Sea, 1897-1997. With Eric Grove. New York: HarperCollins, 1997. ISBN 0-004-72065-2
- Jane's Naval History of WWII. New York: HarperCollins, 1998. ISBN 0-004-72143-8
- History of Ships. London: Hamlyn, 1999. ISBN 0-600-59590-0
- Naval Warfare in the Age of Sail. London: Ted Smart, 2000. ISBN 0-007-62906-0
- War at Sea, 1914-1945. London: Cassell, 2002. ISBN 0-304-35340-X
- The battle of the Atlantic. Barnsley: Pen & Sword, 2003. ISBN 1-844-15001-1
- Válka ve Středomoří: 1940-1943. Prague: Naše vojsko, 2003. ISBN 8-020-60697-1
- The fall of Toulon: the last opportunity to defeat the French Revolution. London: Weidenfeld & Nicolson, 2005. ISBN 0-297-84612-4
- The illustrated guide to aircraft carriers of the world. London: Hermes House, 2005. ISBN 1-844-77747-2
- Leyte Gulf 1944: the world's greatest sea battle. Oxford: Osprey Publishing, 2006. ISBN 1-841-76978-9
- Aircraft Carriers of the World. London: Anness, 2007. ISBN 1-844-76363-3
- Vliegdekschepen. With Gerjan van Oosten. Utrecht: Veltman Uitgevers, 2007. ISBN 9-059-20598-7
- The world encyclopedia of cruisers. London: Lorenz (Anness), 2008. ISBN 0-754-81773-3
- The world encyclopedia of destroyers and frigates. London: Lorenz (Anness), 2008. ISBN 0-754-81867-5
