= William Laird Clowes =

British journalist and historian

Sir William Laird Clowes
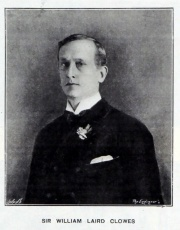
- Born: 1 February 1856; Hampstead, London
- Died: 14 August 1905 (aged 49); St Leonards, East Sussex
- Occupations: journalist and historian

Sir William Laird Clowes FKC (1 February 1856 – 14 August 1905) was a British journalist and historian whose principal work was The Royal Navy, A History from the Earliest Times to 1900, a text that is still in print. He also wrote numerous technical pieces on naval technology and strategy and was also noted for his articles concerning racial politics in the Southern United States. Despite having trained as a lawyer, Clowes had always preferred literature and writing, publishing his first work in 1876 and becoming a full-time journalist in 1879. For the services rendered in his career, Clowes was knighted, awarded the gold medal of the United States Naval Institute and given a civil list pension. He died in Sussex in 1905 after years of ill health.

== Life ==
Born in 1856 in Hampstead, Clowes was educated at Aldenham School and studied law at King's College London and Lincoln's Inn. In 1876 his first work, a poetic Egyptian love story named Meroë was published and in 1879 he left the law to become a journalist, training outside London but returning in 1882 with his new wife Ethel Mary Louise. Clowes first job was with the Army and Navy Gazette, at which he rapidly learned about the British military, in particular the Royal Navy. Writing under the pseudonym Nauticus, Clowes covered the Royal Navy's manoeuvres in home waters for several newspapers and became an established authority on naval tactics and technology, publishing articles on gunnery, torpedoes and other naval issues of the time. An article written in 1893 has been credited with affecting the naval estimates of that year, the standard by which the relative power of navies was assessed. His 1894 novel, The Captain of the Mary Rose described a fictional modern naval war between Britain and France.

In his professional career, Clowes took a keen interest in the United States and travelled there many times, beginning in 1890, when he made an extensive study of race relations in the Southern States. Clowes' articles appeared in The Times entitled Black America: a Study of the ex-Slave and his Master, and described the segregation then in place in the region, predicting that it could one day erupt in a civil war. He also worked on the European continent, writing or translating articles in French and German. He spent much time as a contributor and editor of encyclopedias, principally on naval issues and was editor of the Naval Pocket Book for some years. He also promoted the publication of inexpensive paperbacks.

In 1877, Clowes published an article titled "An Amateur Assassin" about his experiences taking hashish. The article is thought to be a precursor to the 1884 book, "Confessions of an English Hachish Eater."

In 1897, Clowes gave up his journalistic career to focus on naval history, spending the next six years compiling his best known work, The Royal Navy, A History from the Earliest Times to 1900. This publication was well received at the time and remains a standard reference text and in print. During the last years of his life he was also a contributor to Traill and Mann's six-volume series Social England and author of Four Modern Naval Campaigns (1902). Much of his research into naval history was carried out abroad, especially in Davos, Switzerland, due to repeated bouts of ill health. For his services to journalism and naval history, he was knighted in the 1902 Coronation Honours, receiving the accolade from King Edward VII at Buckingham Palace on 24 October that year. He was further given a civil list pension of £150, invited to join the Institute of Naval Architects and the Royal United Service Institution and presented with the gold medal of the United States Naval Institute. He also became a Fellow of King's College London. He died in August 1905 at his home in St Leonards, East Sussex, leaving his wife and their son Geoffrey. Lady Clowes was awarded a pension of £100 some months later.
