= Adam and Eve (Dürer) =

1504 engraving and 1507 paintings by Dürer

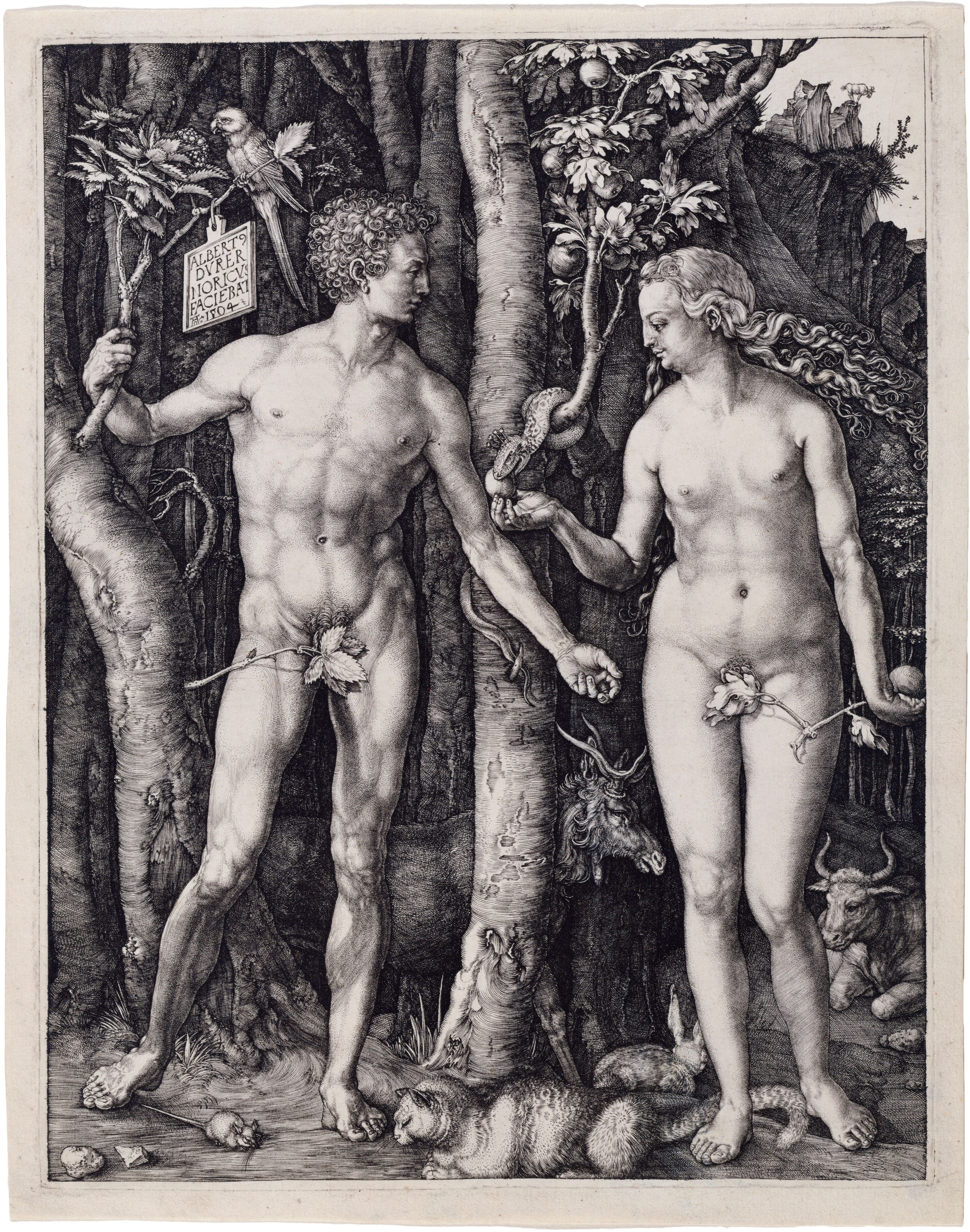
Adam and Eve, 1504, engraving with burin on copper, 25.1 x 19.8 cm

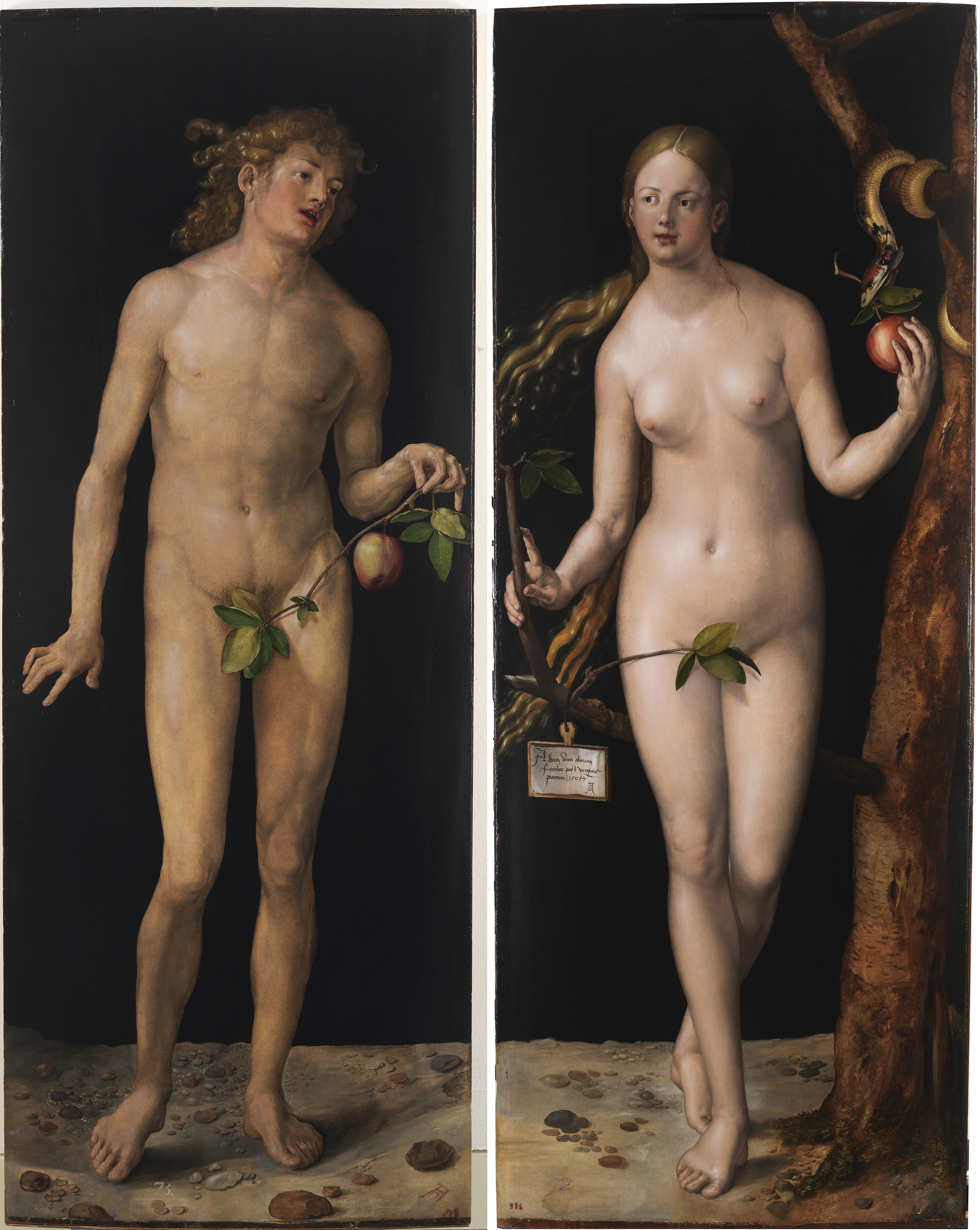
Adam and Eve, 1507, oil on wood panel, 208 x 91 cm per panel. Museo del Prado.

Adam and Eve is the title of two famous works in different media by Albrecht Dürer, a German artist of the Northern Renaissance: an engraving made in 1504, and a pair of oil-on-panel paintings completed in 1507. The 1504 engraving depicts Adam and Eve in the Garden of Eden, surrounded by several symbolic animals. The engraving transformed how Adam and Eve were popularly depicted in art.

The 1507 painting in the Museo del Prado offered Dürer another opportunity to depict the ideal human figure in a different medium. Painted in Nuremberg soon after his return from Venice, the panels were influenced by Italian art. Dürer's observations on his second trip to Italy provided him with new approaches to portraying the human form. Here, he depicts the figures at human scale—the first full-scale nude subjects in German painting.

== 1504 engraving ==
=== Background ===
Dürer continually sought perfection of form in his work. He traveled to Italy to study the Italian Renaissance masters and incorporate their techniques into his art. His first visited Venice in n 1494 where he studied artists such as Giovanni Bellini (who he met), Andrea Mantegna, Antonio del Pollaiuolo, Leonardo da Vinci, and others. One work of art that particularly captured his attention was The Birth of Venus (c. 1484–1486) by Sandro Botticelli. In addition, he was greatly influenced by two ancient classical marble sculptures (both copied after Greek Hellenistic sculptures, now lost) that illustrate the concept of ideal male and female beauty: the Apollo Belvedere (just rediscovered in the 1490s) and the Medici Venus, though Dürer likely discovered these works through second-hand sources, the Apollo for example through an engraving by Nicoletto da Modena of c.1500 or the engraving of Apollo and Diana made by Jacopo de' Barbari around 1503 probably in Nuremberg. This image featured the intricately modeled figure of Apollo in classical contrapposto, inspiring Dürer's interpretation of Adam. Similarly, in Botticelli's The Birth of Venus, the figure of Venus acted as a model for Dürer's later renditions of Eve. Raptured by newfound inspiration, Dürer returned to Nuremberg.

In 1500 Jacopo de' Barbari came to Nuremberg to serve Maximilian I as a court painter. He introduced Dürer to the Vitruvian canon of body proportions and linear perspective. But Dürer wasn't satisfied and began studies of his own, measuring countless living models (of both men and animals). He summarised his techniques in his Four Books on Human Proportion, and in 1504 completed his first engraving of Adam and Eve (burin on copperplate, 25.1 x 19.8 cm).

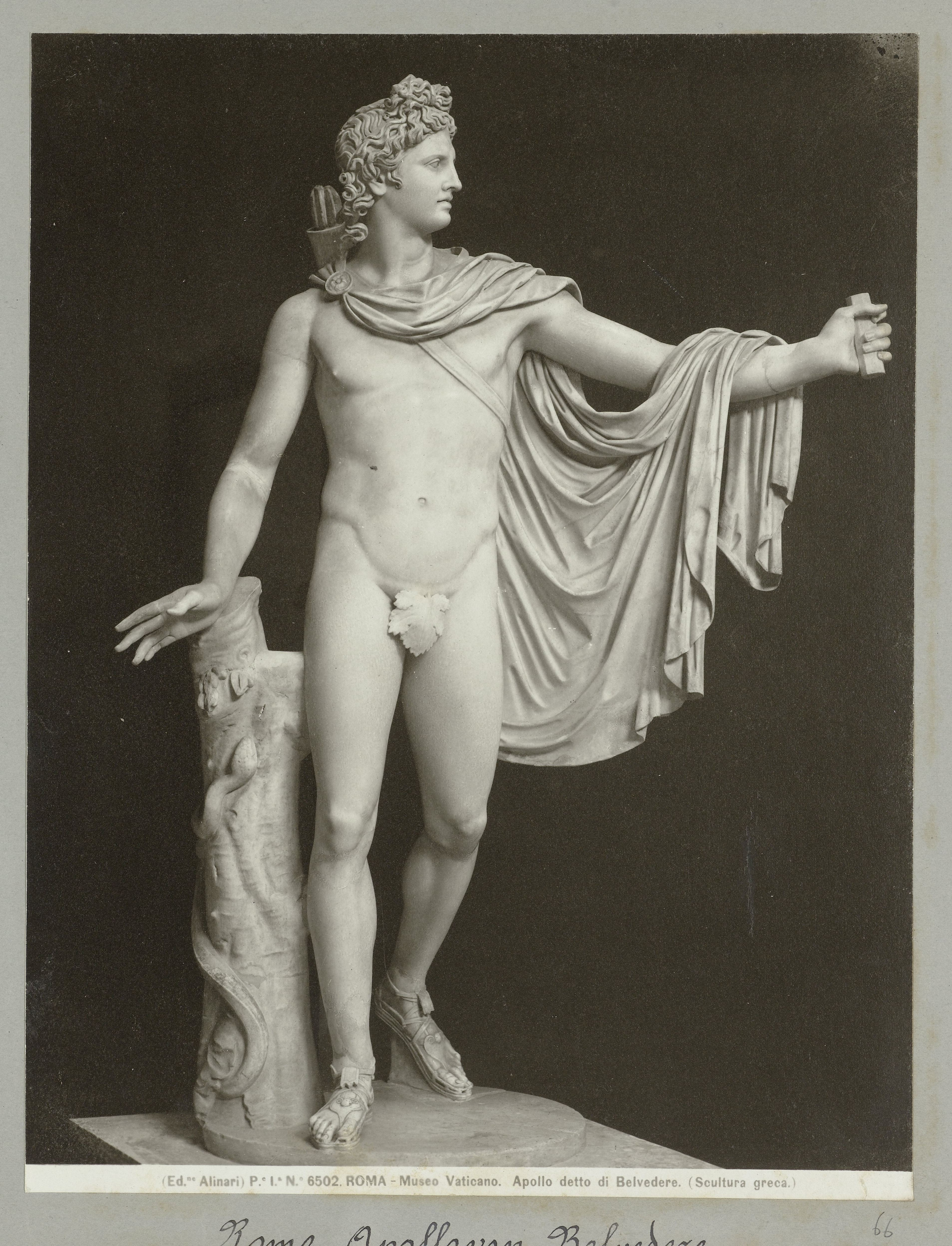
Apollo Belvedere, Vatican Museum, Rome (Photograph by Alinari, c. 1900)

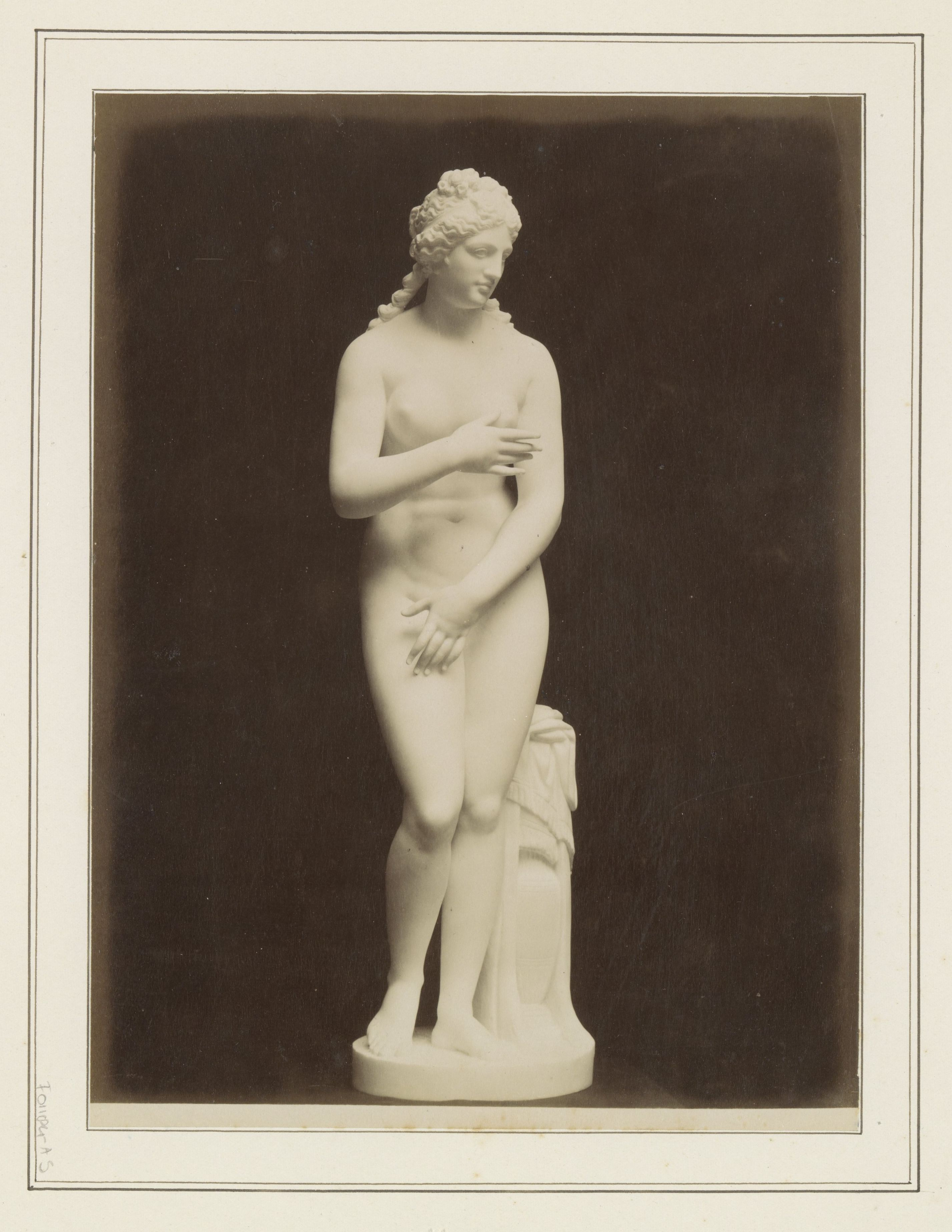
Venus de' Medici, Uffizi, Florence (Photograph, 1865–c. 1890)

Sandro Botticelli, The Birth of Venus, c. 1485, Uffizi

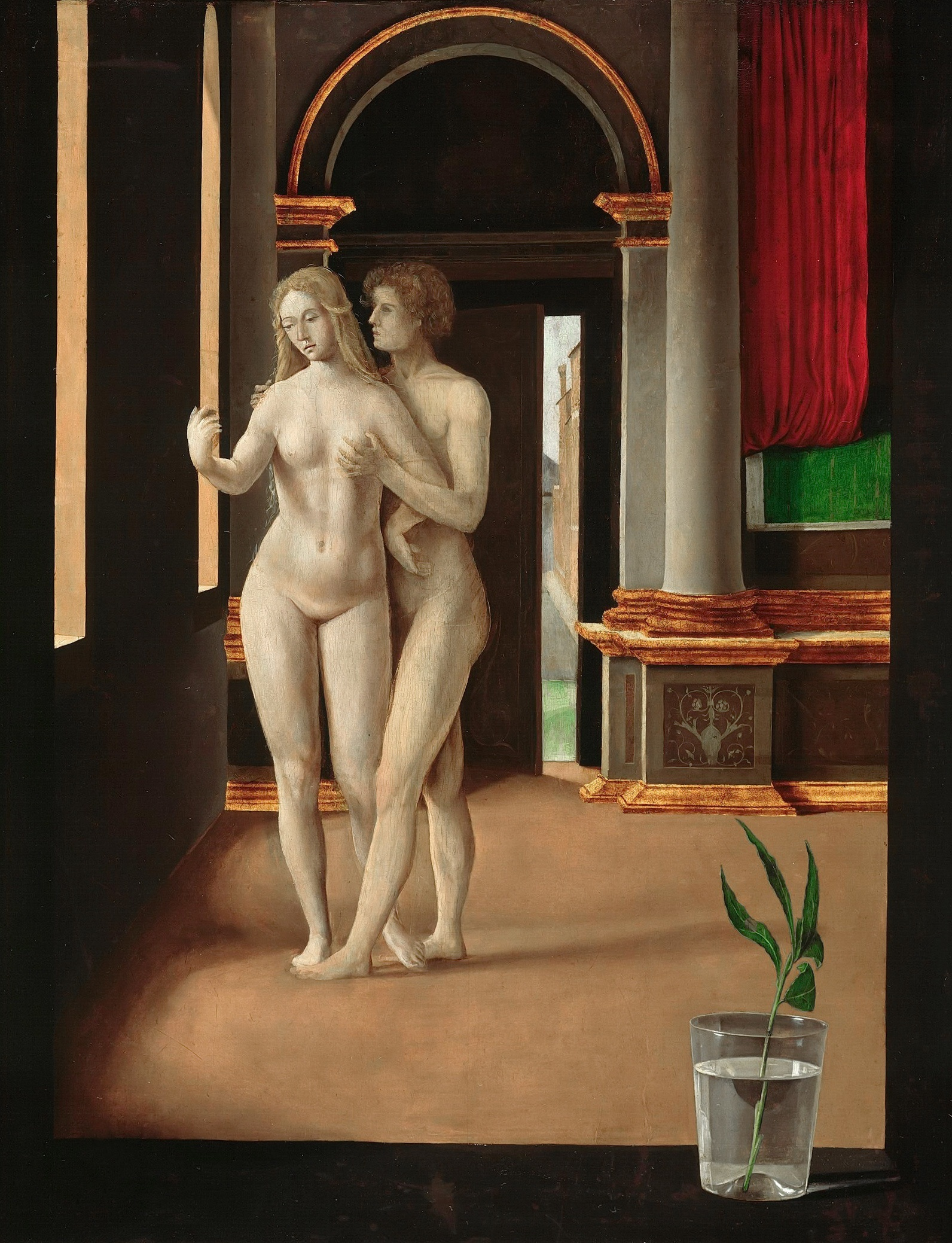
Jacopo de' Barbari, Naked Lovers, reverse side of the Portrait of a German, 1500, Gemäldegalerie, Berlin. The woman with pose and gesture comparable to Eve's.

=== Background and context within his œuvre ===
Dürer drew his first full frontal Female Nude in 1493 after a living model, followed by several subsequent nudes seen from the back, among them an early depiction of Adam and Eve before the Fall. Elaborated works were the drawing of the women in the Women's Bath (1496) and the engraving of The Four Naked Women (1497). These early female nudes were followed by studies of figures with constructed body proportions, some using outlines drawn with ruler and compass, first the Reclining Nude and the engraving of the Nemesis, both from 1501. But the only figure of which the pose relates closely to the Eve is the Venus in the engraving of The Dream of the Doctor (c. 1498), a refined version of one of the Four Naked Women, the body mirrored, now in ideal contrapposto with lowered shoulder over the supporting leg, the other leg free to move.

As for the Adam, there are several works that followed the same antetype and were likely preparatory. The most prominent one is Apollo with the Solar Disc, one of Dürer's early male figures designed according to classical proportions, where he seemed to have copied de' Barbari freely in showing Diana from behind at Apollo's feet, who is depicted as Sol, since Diana, as a moon goddess, tries to protect herself from his light conquering the day. Dürer obviously was not satisfied, since he didn't finish the drawing. The Apollo he drew again, this time with a bow. Another closely linked study drawing is the Male Nude with Glass and Snake (also called Asclepius) with traces of extensive use of ruler and compass.

His final interpretation of de' Barbari's Apollo and Diana brings Diana into clearer view and turns her towards the viewer, giving her similar prominence to Apollo. Apollo's muscularity and the piece's finely tuned textures resemble the depiction of Adam.

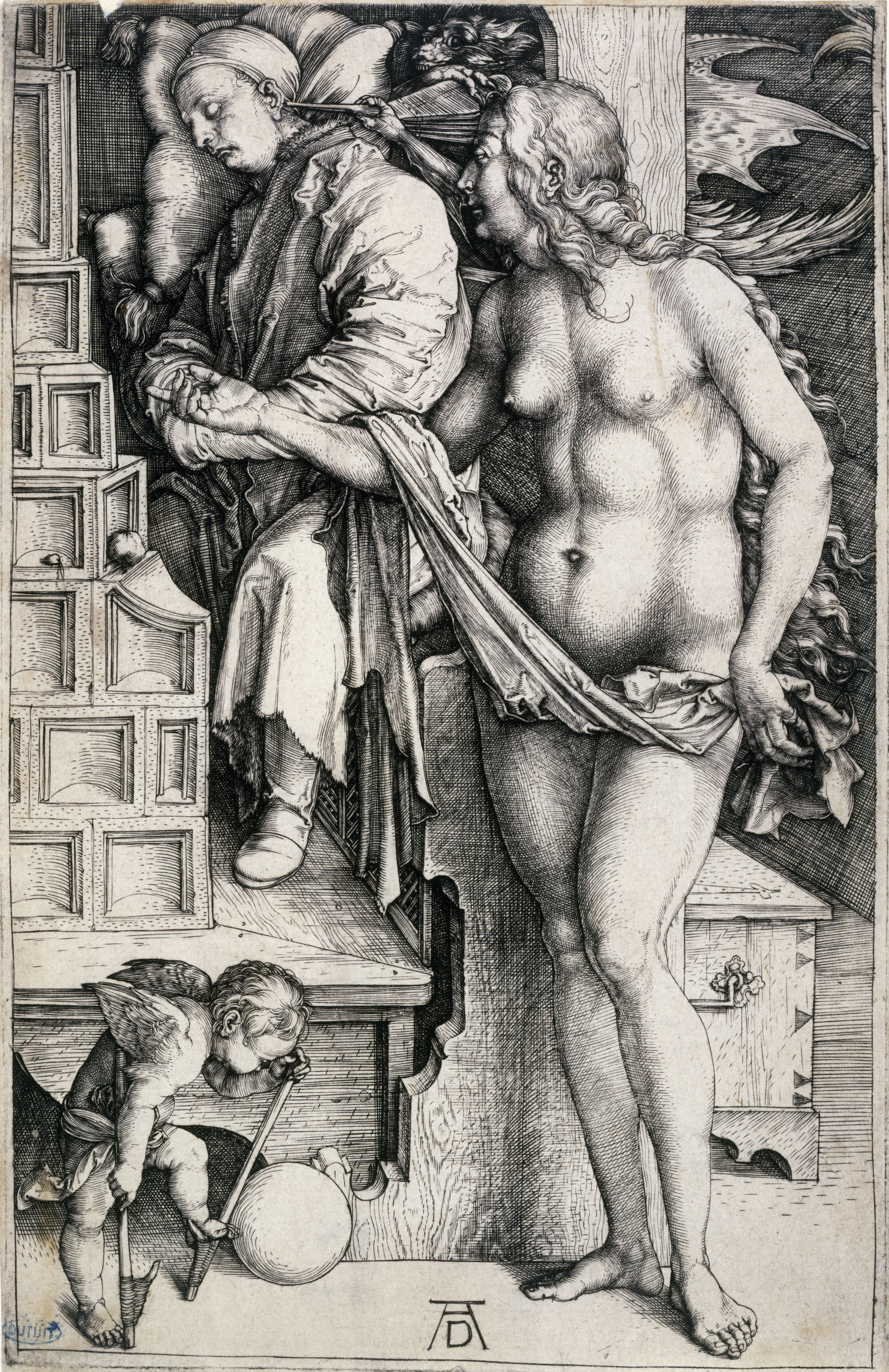
Temptation of the Idler (The Dream of the Doctor), c. 1498, engraving, 18.8 × 11.9 cm (Petit Palais, Paris)

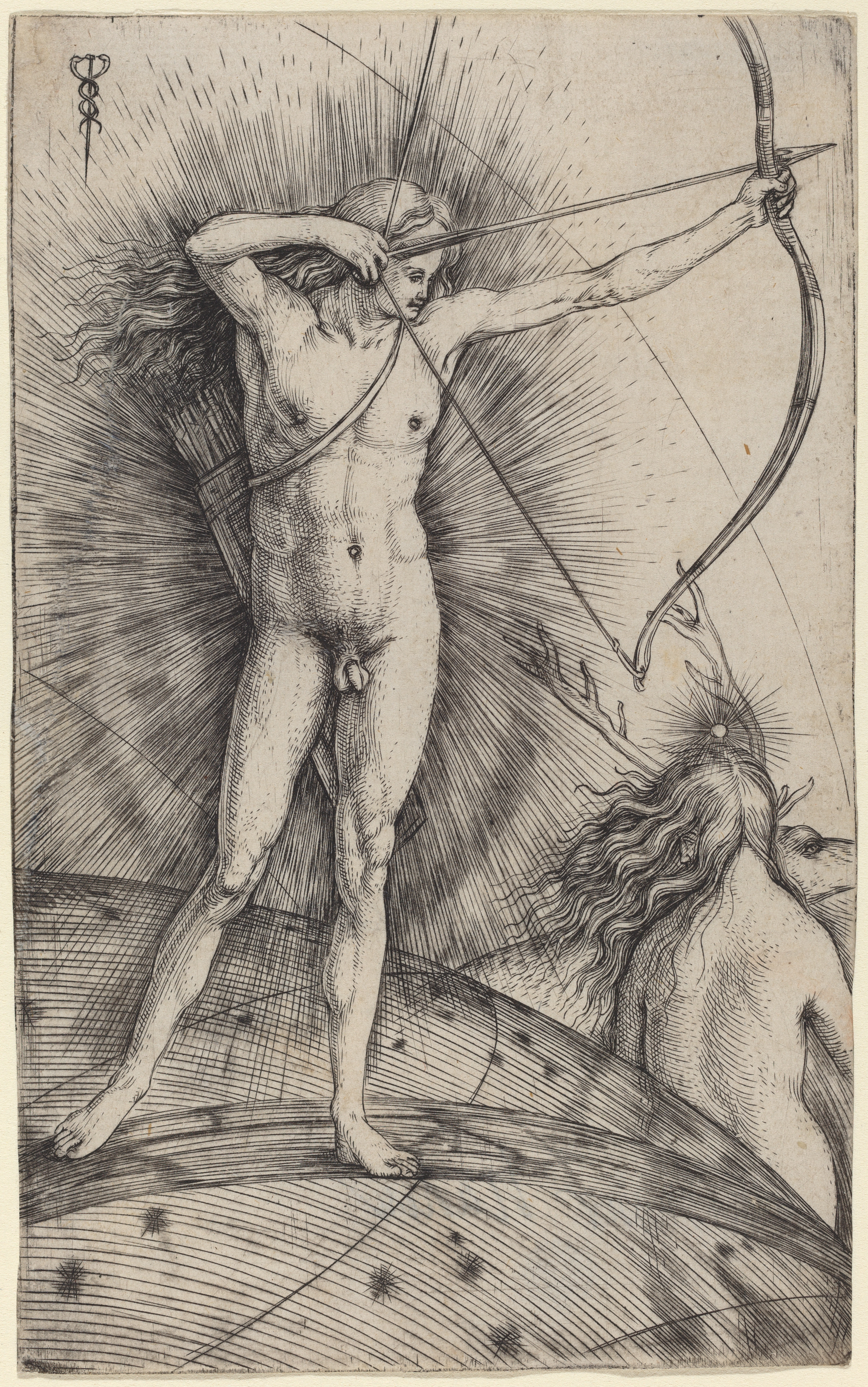
Jacopo de' Barbari, Apollo and Diana, c. 1503, engraving, 16 x 9.8 cm (NGA, Washington DC)

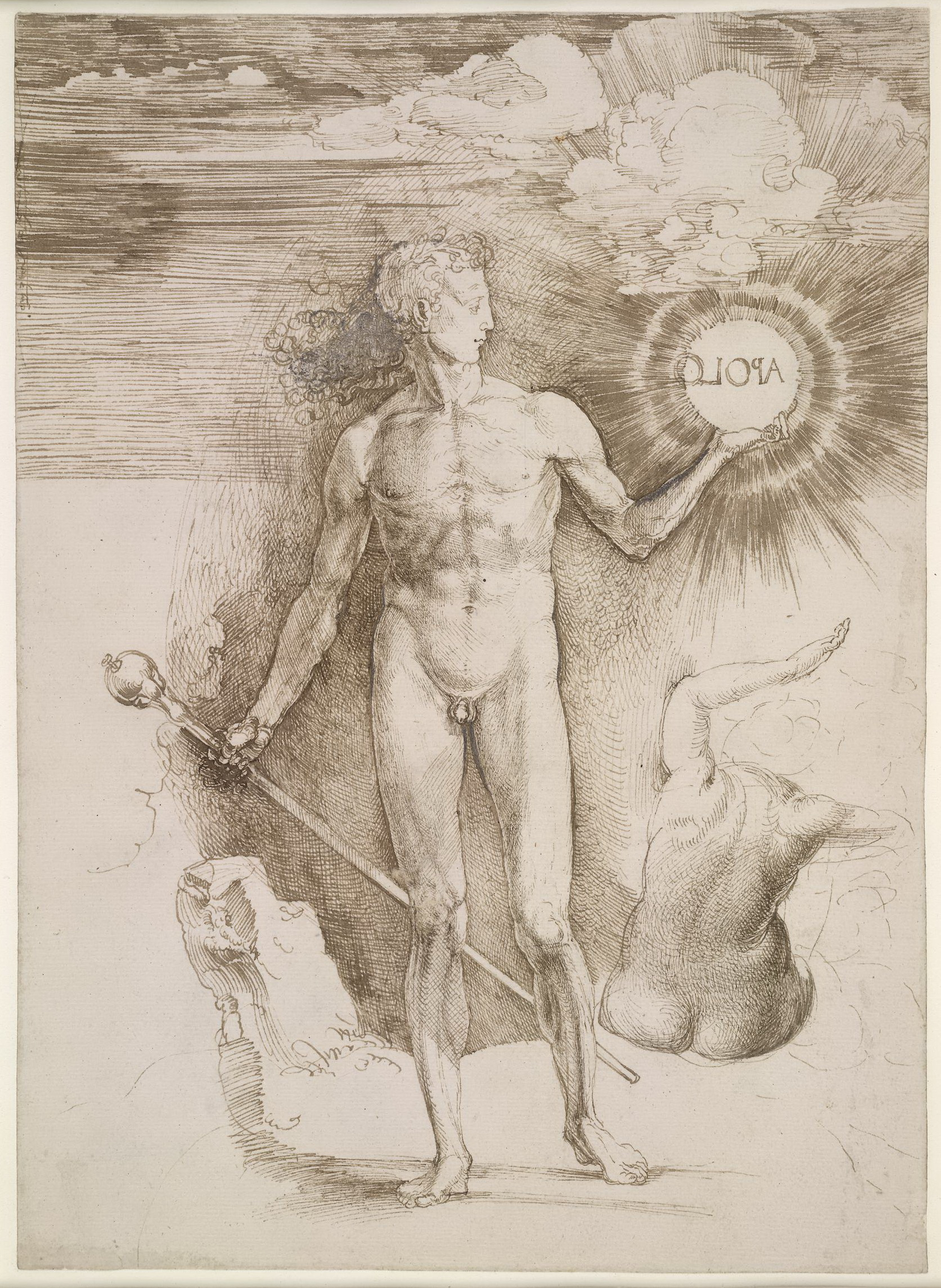
Dürer's Apollo (with the Solar Disc), c. 1504, pen, 28.5 × 20.2 cm, British Museum, London

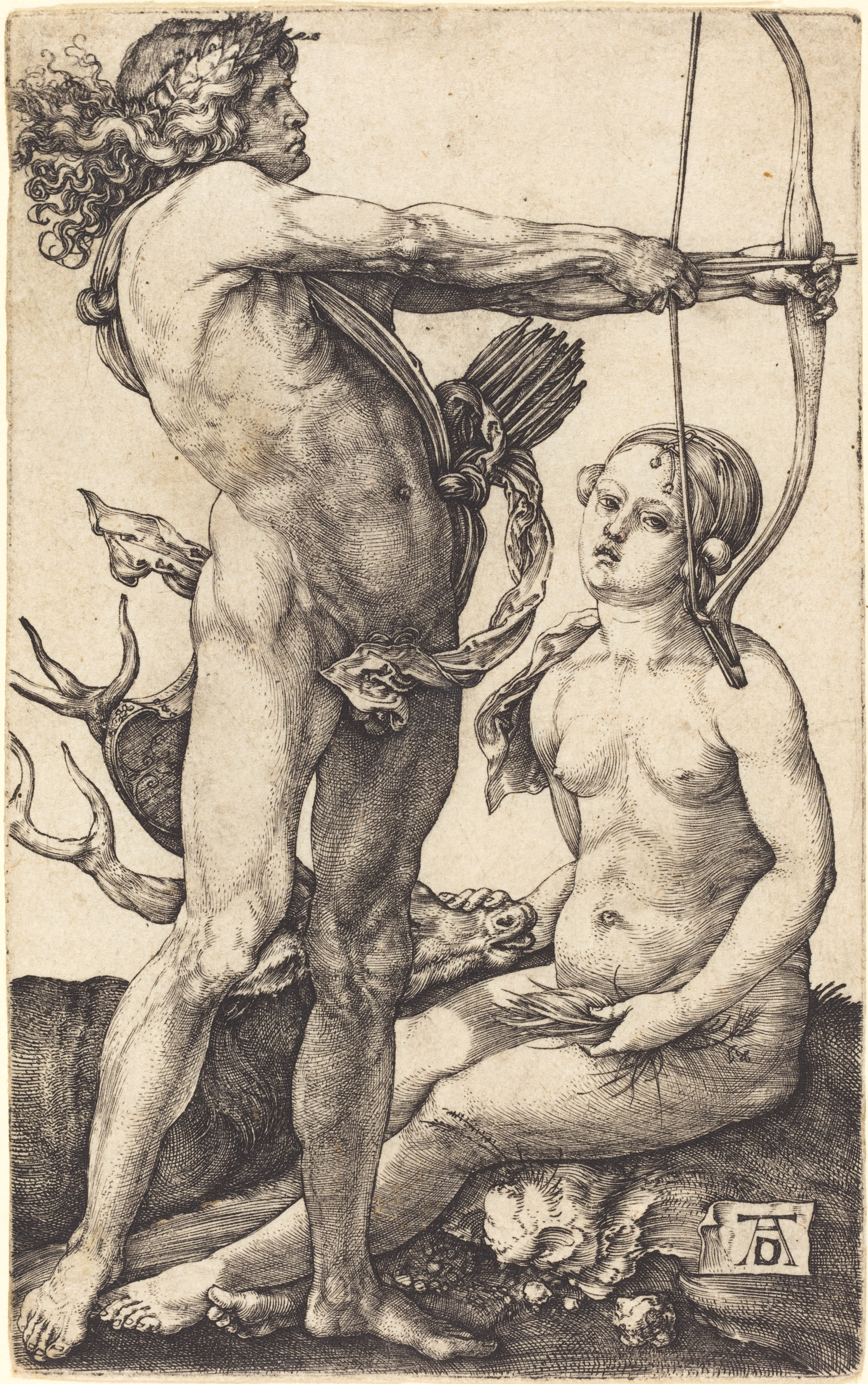
Dürer's Apollo and Diana, 1504–1505, engraving, 11,4 × 7,2 cm (NGA)

=== Imagery, style and technique ===
The engraving captures an idealistic Adam and Eve before the Fall of Man. Adam and Eve are depicted as the ideal body shape of both man and woman respectively. This engraving was one of the first depictions of Adam and Eve that focused on human physical beauty rather than the depiction of sin, causing many artists to later draw inspiration from this perspective shift. As the first man and woman sculpted by God, Adam and Eve were considered perfect characters to embody the ideal human figure.

Both figures are nude and posed in antique contrapposto. Their bodies face the viewer, with their heads in profile facing each other, accentuated by a slight tilt of their bodies. The figures do not overlap and can be seen in full view (except for their genitals), emphasizing their bodies' form. Dürer uses the engraved line work to play with light and dark shadows, illuminating the pale skin and modeling the musculature of both bodies. The bright figures stand out in front of the dark background of the forest that (nearly) completely fills the plate, just like oil paint covers a panel all over.

Dürer made separate preparatory drawings for each figure. Two trial proofs, printed he printed while he was still working on the engraving, have survived. They show his specific proceedings in both working stages. The trial prints reveal the ordering in which elements of the composition were added - for example, that the cat was added later. In the case of the drawings he first constructed a body with ruler and compass on one side of a sheet. Then he traced the outlines of the figure onto the reverse, where he modeled the actual three-dimensional body with hatchings, and washed a dark background with a brush. Unlike Adam, Eve's pose changed signficantly, though her breasts were never covered as in Venus pudica.

In a later stage, two sheets with figure studies of both figures he joined with a third strip of paper, afterwards washing the background resulting in a single image. The apple Adam still holds in his hand, now corresponds with the one in Eve's hand, as if the sin was evenly shared. In the final engraving nevertheless Eve will be responsible.

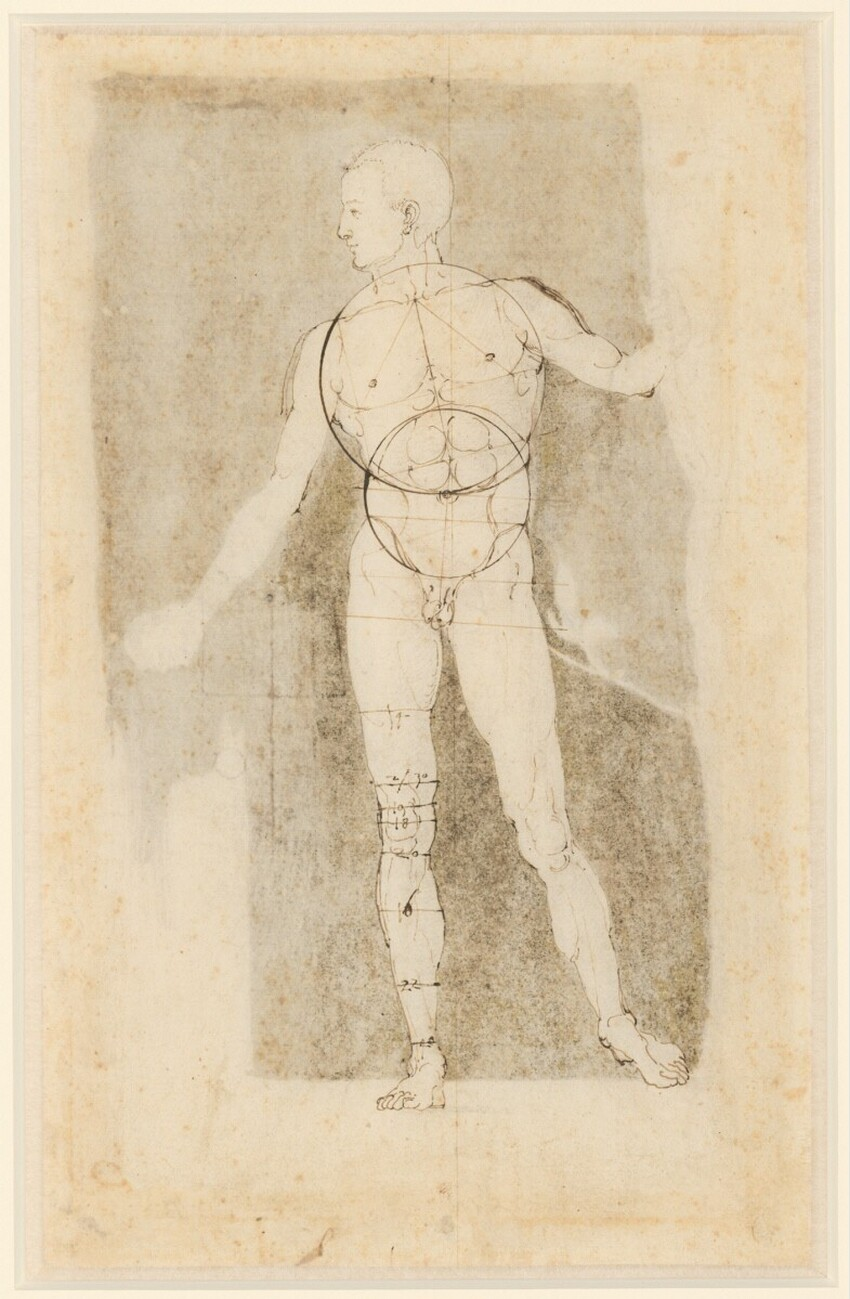
Construction drawing of Adam, 1504, pen, 26.2 x 16.6 cm, Albertina, Vienna (3080r)

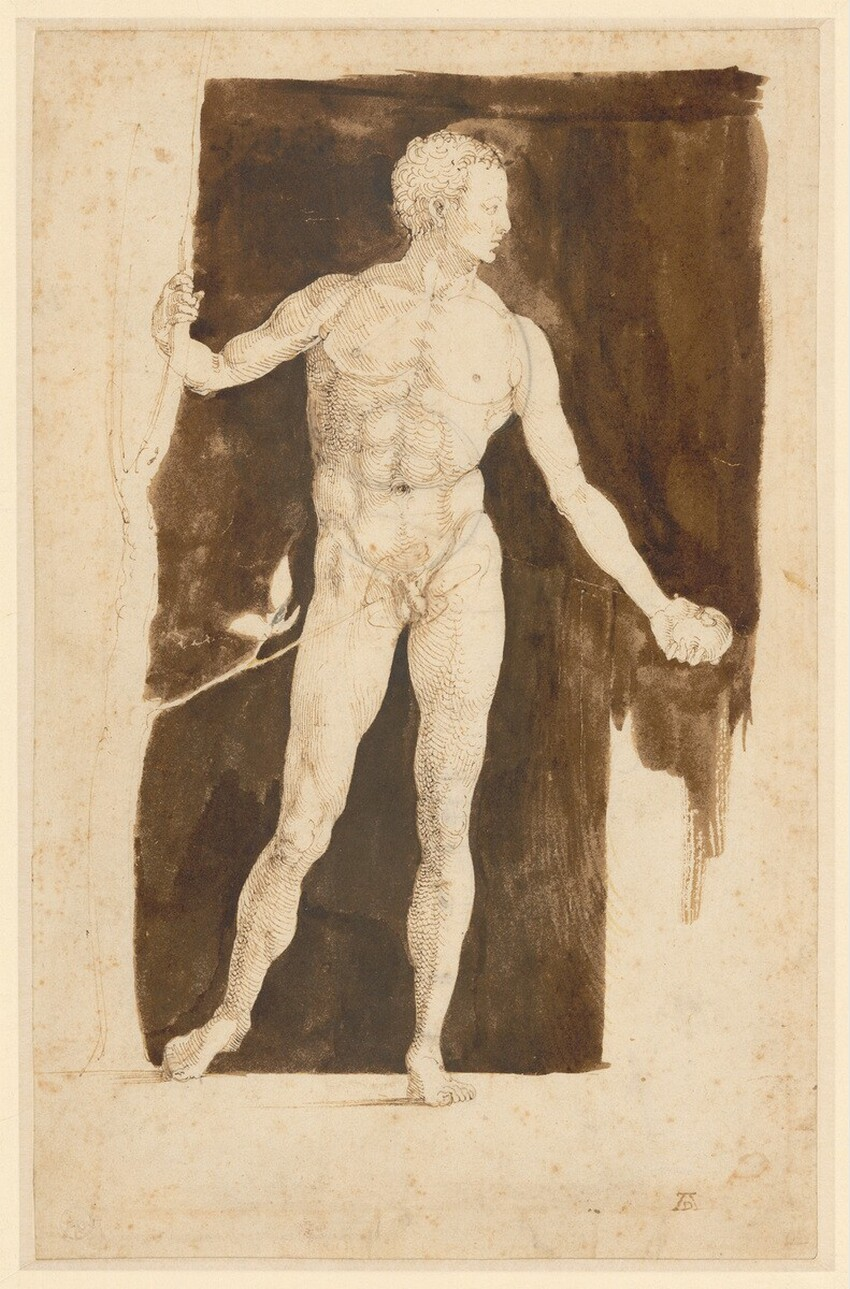
Final drawing of Adam, 1504, pen and brush for the background, 26.2 x 16.6 cm, Albertina (3080v)

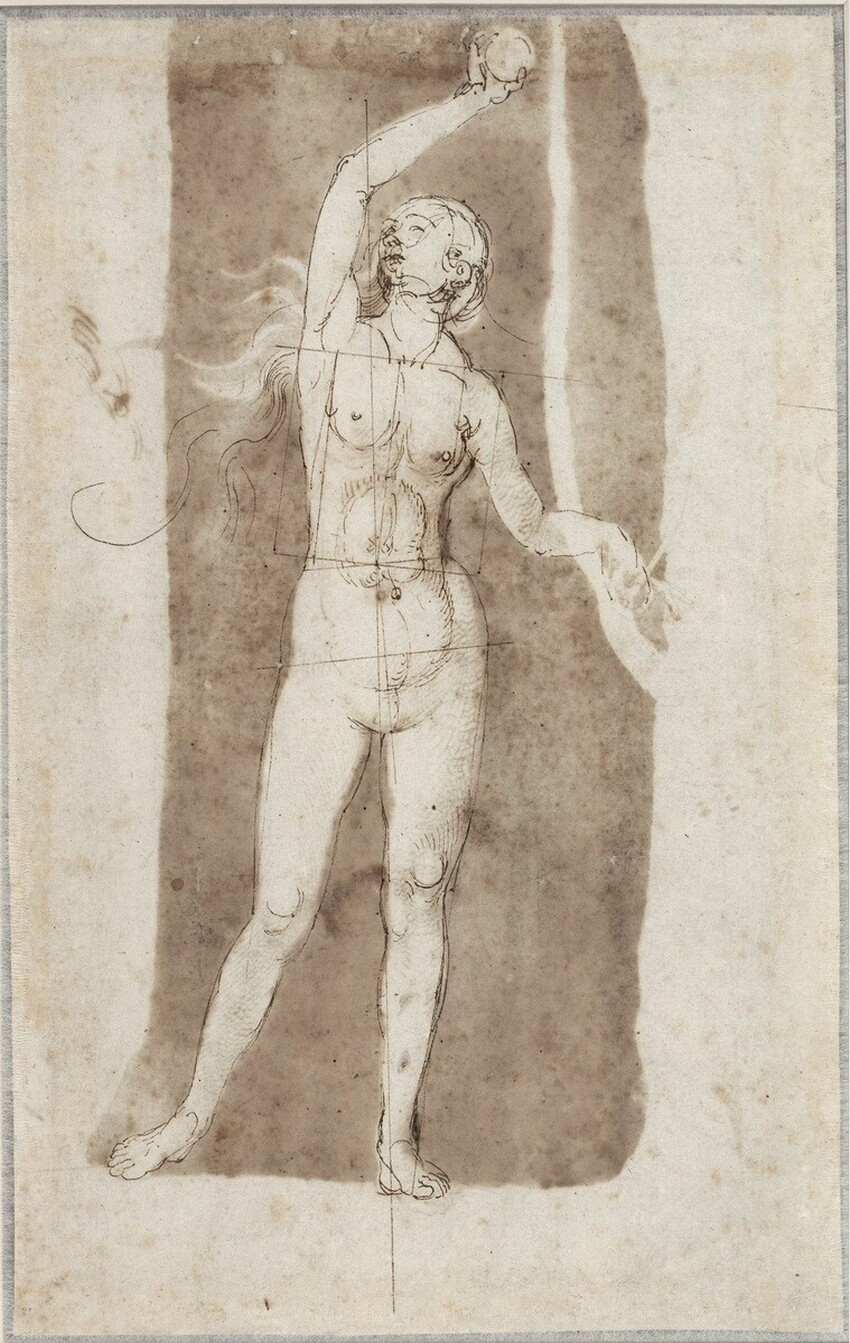
Construction drawing of Eve, c. 1506, pen, 26.2 x 16.5 cm, Albertina (3081r)

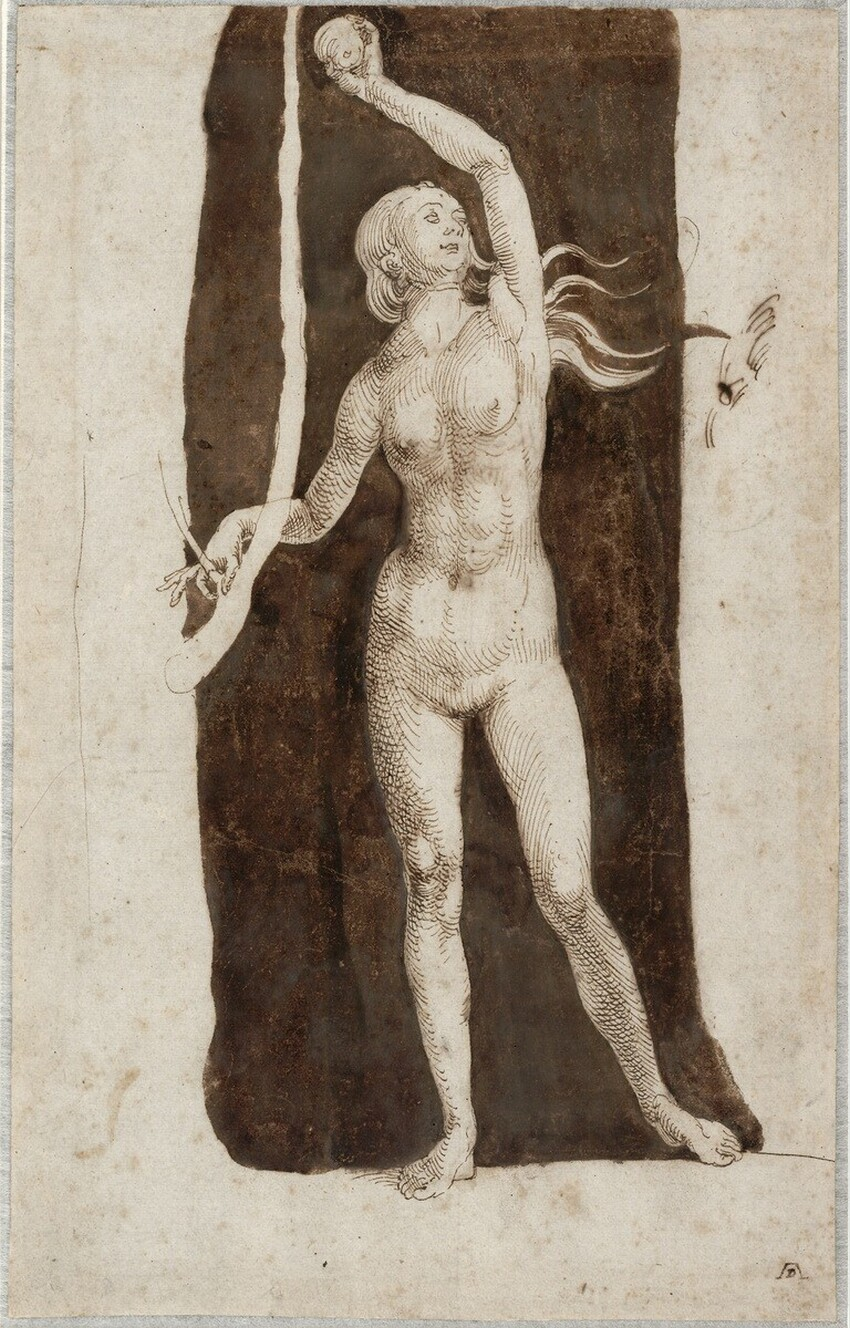
Final drawing of Eve, c. 1506, pen and brush, 26.2 x 16.5 cm, Albertina (3081v)

Adam and Eve, pen, brown ink and white watercolor, two sheets joined with another strip, brown wash, 24.2 x 20.1 cm, Morgan Library & Museum (I, 254d)

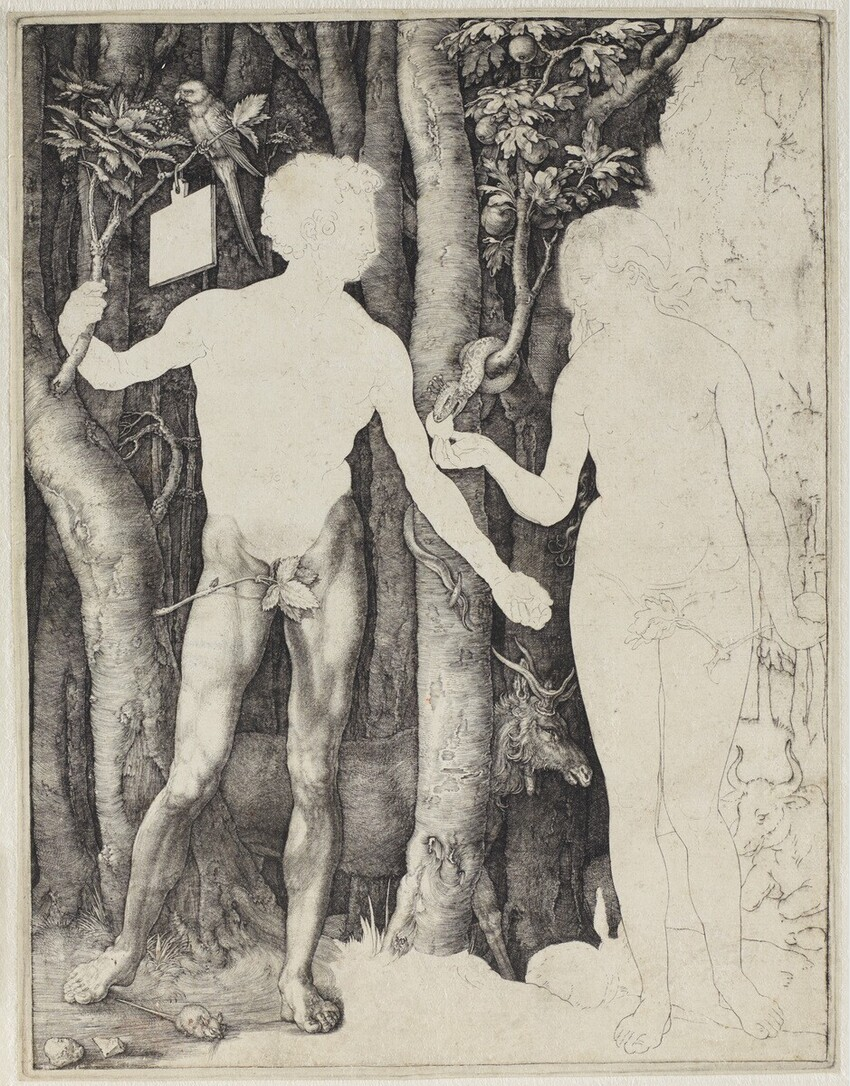
Second trial proof of the Adam and Eve, Albertina (DG1930.1450)

Adam is depicted more lean, muscular and about a forehead's height taller than Eve, while her body is more supple and rounded. Dürer gained the "silken softness" of her skin through finer graded lines that in part "dissolve in stipples, and [by] add[ing] a third series of curves" which creates density in the hatching. Erwin Panofsky estimated "twice or three times as many lines per square inch as in earlier [engravings]." This technique he had trained since around 1500 expanded the spectrum of light values on both ends and allowed even more detailed and differentiated textures.

=== Symbolism ===
Adam and Eve are shown in the Garden of Eden. As the image is a depiction of humanity before the Fall, everything remains in perfect harmony. Placed directly between the pair of figures stands a fig tree, the Tree of Knowledge, but is represented here, as was usual, as a hybrid since the fruit of the tree is apple. Eve is offered a fruit by the snake and holds in her left hand already one tied to a broken branch with fig leaves that cover her genitals. It is a direct reference to the shame that Adam and Eve would experience after the Fall, as described in Genesis 3:7: "And the eyes of both were opened, and they knew that they were naked; and they sewed fig leaves together and made themselves aprons." The Forbidden Fruit in her left (sinister in Latin) hand, that she is about to share with Adam, symbolizes evil. Adam's genitals are covered by a shoot of a mountain ash that frames the left side of the picture. The tree symbolizes the Tree of Life.

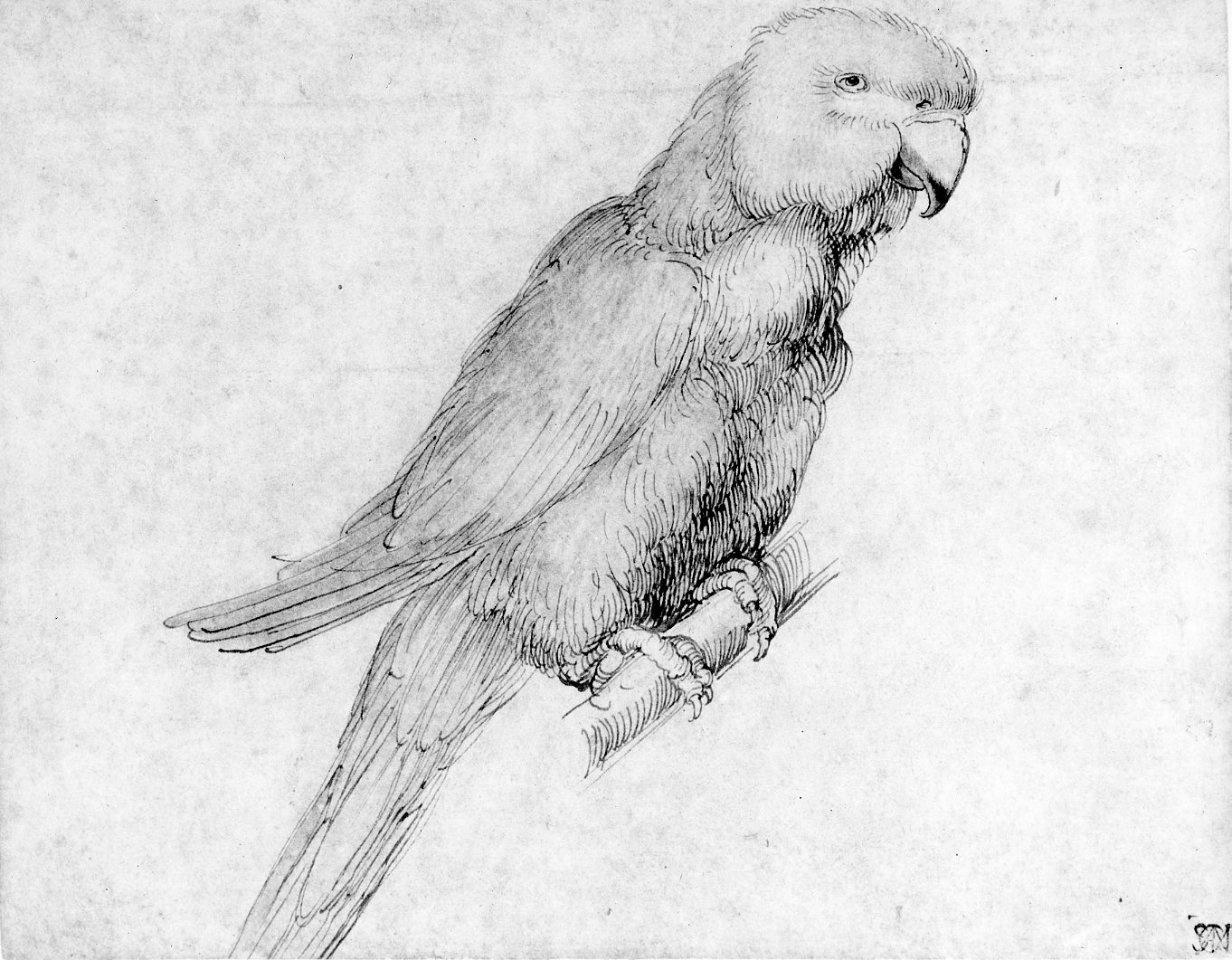
Parrott, drawing by Dürer, Biblioteca Ambrosiana, Milan

On the tree above the plaque with Dürer's autograph sits a parrot. Since around 1500 Dürer had an increased interest in animals and plants, of which he made many drawings and watercolors. The famous Great Piece of Turf for example, the Young Hare, and the Wing of a Blue Roller are from that time, but also a drawing of a parrot, that very much resembles the one in the engraving. Parrots can symbolize different ideas, including: wisdom, the Word of God, Christ, eternal life, and paradise. But it could also refer to the New World. At this time, the colonization of the New World was in full swing and certain objects from the Americas came to symbolize paradise, as Europeans had come to believe paradise would be found in the Americas. Thus, certain objects that originated from the New World became common symbols of paradise in art, a possible meaning for the parrot represented here. Moreover, it is known through his diary writings that Dürer saw and even collected exotic items from the East (the Orient), as well as the Americas while on trips to both Italy and Flanders. Some of these marvelous objects included a large fishbone, porcelain dishes from China, while other items like cloths (some made out of silk), feathers, an ivory salt-cellar came from "Calicut," which in the Renaissance was a catch-all term that could reference India, Africa or the Americas, indicating a geographical misunderstanding of the wider world.

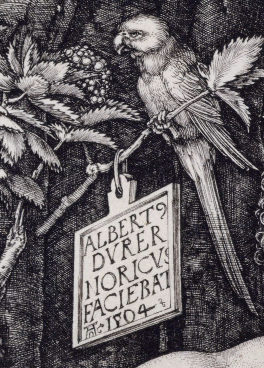
Plaque and parrot, Adam and Eve, 1504

Around Adam and Eve lie four animals representing the four humors or temperaments. The cat symbolizes the choleric humor, the rabbit the sanguine (from Latin sanguineus, "of blood": vivacious) temperament, the ox phlegmatic humor, while the elk represents melancholy. Although the contemporary belief was that an imbalance of bodily fluids caused undesirable humors, in Eden, everything is in perfect harmony. Visually, this is represented by the peaceful cohabitant nature of the animals: the cat is not pouncing on the mouse, the ox is sitting calmly. This representation of balanced harmony, however, would be forever destroyed once the Fall occurred. Finally, the relationship of the mouse and feline at the feet of the figures parallels that of Adam and Eve.

The small plaque (cartellino in Italian) is his first inscription in an engraving written in Latin, it reads "Albert Dürer noricvs faciebat 1504," which translates to "Albrecht Dürer of Nuremberg was making [this in] 1504." Despite Dürer's fascination with Italian art, this inscription demonstrates his pride regarding his Northern heritage, clearly identifying his hometown as the German city of Nuremberg (Noricus in Latin). Moreover, Dürer is subtly flaunting the immortality of his work since the plaque is attached to the Tree of Life.

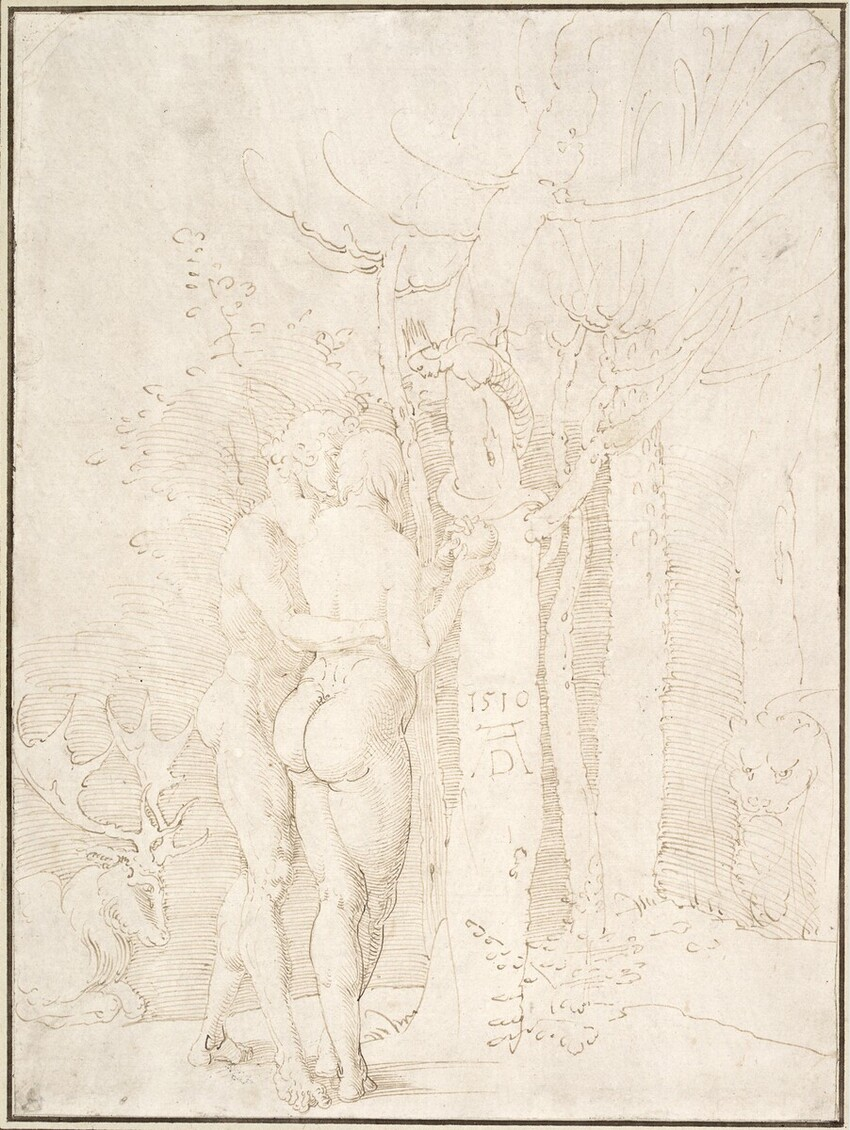
Albrecht Dürer, Adam and Eve, 1510, drawing, 29,4 x 21,9 cm, Albertina (3124)

Dürer's treatment of the theme followed in 1510 with a light but intimate ink drawing, where Adam and Eve are unusually shown from behind, turned away from the viewer, embracing each other. They are depicted as lovers and about to share a fruit from the Tree of Knowledge. The figure of Eve with her crossed legs relates to the images of the Fall and the Expulsion from Paradise featured in the Small Passion. But in the Fall Eve is turned around again, while in the Expulsion the figures are in motion. The snake which the lovers ignore has a female torso instead of its head, an Italian motif.

=== Copies ===
During his lifetime, the copper engraving of Adam and Eve was printed many times, resulting in multiple extant prints in different collections. In addition, unauthorized copies of his print were made during Dürer's lifetime in Florence, Italy, now at the Uffizi, and for example one made in Mainz, Germany, during the time of Napoleon.

Original prints (not seldom in several copies) are held at the Graphic Art Collection of the City of Nuremberg, the Kupferstichkabinetts in Berlin and Dresden, the Städel Museum in Frankfurt, the Albertina in Vienna, the British Museum in London, the Rijksmuseum Amsterdam, National Museum in Warsaw, the Israel Museum in Jerusalem and other institutions. In the US prints are found at the Library of Congress, the Metropolitan Museum of Art and the Morgan Library & Museum in New York, the Museum of Fine Arts, Boston, the Art Institute of Chicago, the Cincinnati Art Museum, the Harvard Art Museums, the Minneapolis Institute of Art, the Philadelphia Museum of Art, the Yale University Art Gallery, among others.

== Oil paintings ==
=== Background and historical context ===
After the creation of the engraving of 1504, Dürer revisited the subject of Adam and Eve after a second visit to Italy, when he spent most of his time in Venice to further study Italian Renaissance paintings. During his two years in Venice, from 1505 until 1507, Dürer analyzed various techniques and famous works of art, developing his use of classical Italian contrapposto. Returning to Nuremberg with his newly acquired skill and knowledge, Dürer painted in 1507 what is considered to be the first life-sized nude painting in German art, Adam and Eve (oil on wood, 209 x 81 cm per panel).

=== Style and symbolism ===
Dürer believed the way to paint the ideal human form was through a precise mathematical system of proportions. In his oil painting of Adam and Eve, Dürer altered the proportions of the head to the body of Eve's figure from the 1:7.4 ratio of the engraving to 1:8.2. This alteration visually elongated Eve's body, providing her with a slender, weightless quality. This weightlessness was typical of Gothic figure depictions, illuminating a stylistic shift from the classical contrapposto of the engraving figures. This can further be seen in the positioning of the limbs: Eve's legs are crossed, one directly behind the other rather than the more grounded-appearing side by side stance as seen in the engraving. This new means of depicting Eve became a template for many later female nude paintings. Adam's figure, however, remains in contrapposto, still reminiscent of the classical depictions of Apollo. Both figures are presented more androgynously than in the 1504 engraving, likely the result of a return to a more Gothic style.

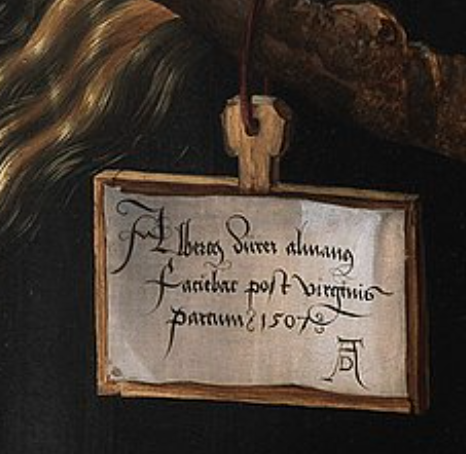
Plaque, Adam and Eve, 1507

Lighting is also strategically used to emphasize the figures. Adam is bathed in warm light, contrasting Eve who is bathed in cool toned, almost slivery, light. The color palette as a whole is strategic, using subtle light and dark shadows to minimize contrast and allow the painting a subtly. This choice is in opposition to the 1504 engraving where, due to the nature of the material, everything is sharp with high contrast. In the oil painting, Adam holds a tree branch, meant to symbolize the mountain ash that symbolizes the Tree of Life just as the branch in the engraving does. Eve rests her hand above a branch where a cartellino hangs with Latin writing that reads,"Albertus durer alemanus faciebat post virginis partum 1507," ("Albrecht Dürer, upper German, made this 1507 years after the Virgin's offspring.")

The painting consists of two separate rectangular panels: one of Adam and one of Eve. While the engraving of 1504 communicates the story of the Fall of Man, the oil painting is primarily focused on the individual figures of Adam and Eve, emphasized by the lack of intricate background and symbolism. The actual reason behind Dürer's choice to paint Adam and Eve separately remains unknown, however, it was one of the first works of art to create a division of the subjects, an artistic choice that many later artists copied.

=== Restoration ===
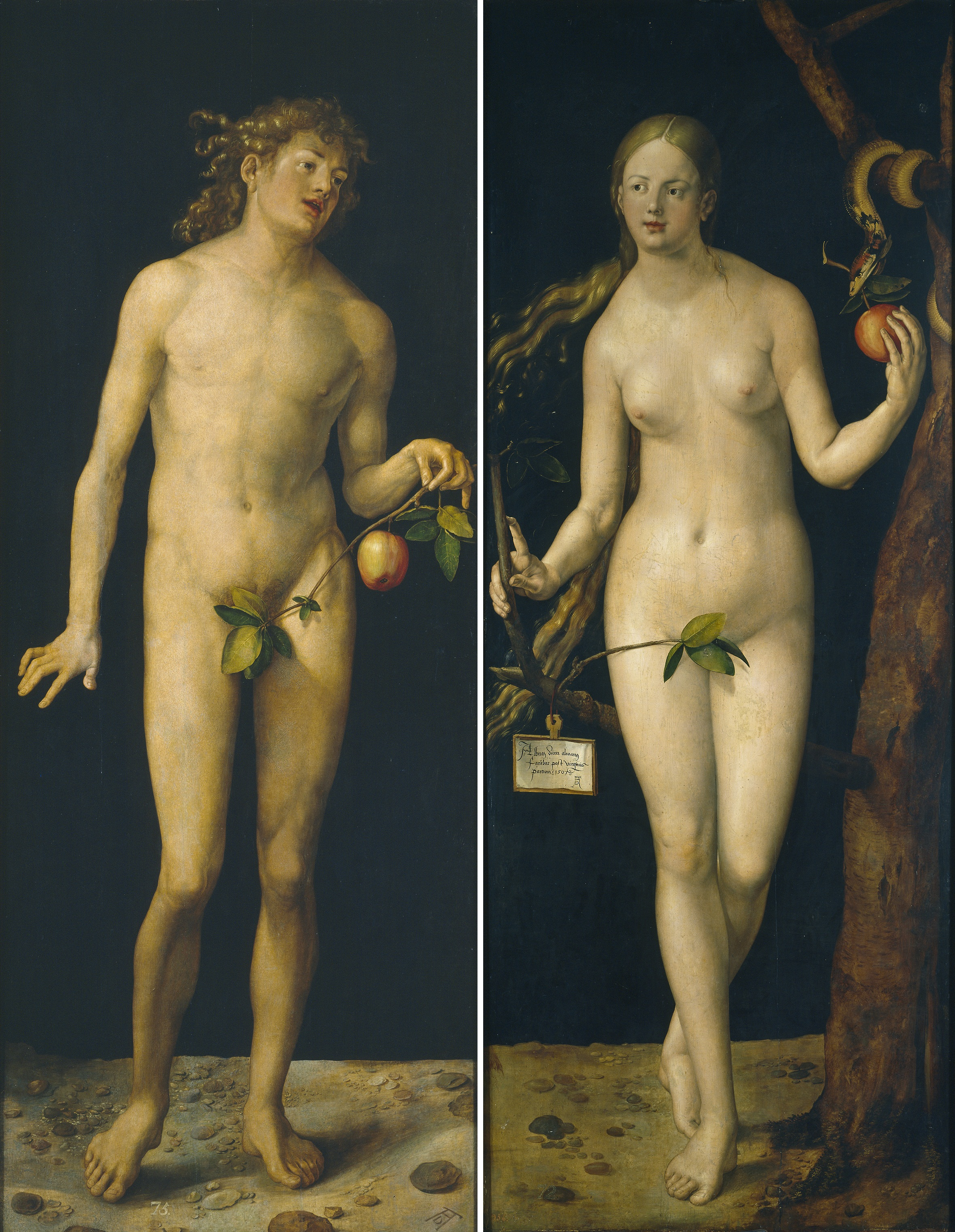
Adam and Eve, 1507, pre-restoration

The oil painting of 1507 were completed on wooden panels. Wood and paint have complex aging processes, leading to difficulty in both conservation and restoration. Over time, multiple attempts at restoration led to the addition of layers of new paint and oxidized varnish, which in turn distorted the original image. Moreover, the back of the wooden panels had been reinforced in an attempt to prevent warping of wood. Unfortunately, these reinforcements ultimately had the opposite effect, distorting the panels further. The Met and the Museo del Prado collaborated to restore the painting to its original condition in 2020. Removing the back support panels, smoothing the wood, removing oxidized varnish, and finally taking off additional attempts at restorative painting touch-ups, the painting was returned to what is believed to be its original state. Due to the oxidized varnish, the image previously had an overall green hue. Now, that green hue is gone and the colors are as Dürer painted them.

=== Provenance ===
There is no extant archival documents that shed light on the original patron of Dürer's series. Scholars suggest that they may have been commissioned for the Town Hall in Nuremberg, Dürer's hometown, as they were installed there at the end of the sixteenth century. In turn, the Nuremberg City Council gifted them to Emperor Rudolph II who displayed them in his new gallery room at Prague Castle.

During the Thirty Years' War when the Sweeds stormed Nuremberg in 1648 during the Battle of Prague their armies plundered the castle and moved the panels to Stockholm where they entered the collection of Gustavus Adolphus of Sweden. His daughter, Christina of Sweden, gave the work to Philip IV of Spain in 1654, after her abdication. The works moved next to The Royal Palace of Madrid, but were considered "nudes" so were relocated and displayed in a separate room known as the "Vaults of Titian." This vault survived the fire in 1734 that destroyed much of the palace and its art. The paintings were then transported to the Buen Retiro palace.

In 1762, if not for the persuasion of Anton Raphael Mengs, King Charles III of Spain's court painter, they would have been destroyed as they viewed the nudity as "indecent". Mengs convinced the king that the panels were artistically important. About ten years later, the paintings were moved to the Academia de San Fernando for storage. The remained stored there for several decades until exhibited at the Sala de Juntas between 1809 and 1818, during the rule of Jose Bonaparte. In 1827, the two panels were moved to their current location, the Museo del Prado in Madrid, where they remained out of public view because of their nudity until 1838, when they finally were displayed to the public.
