= HMS Meleager =

Two ships of the Royal Navy have borne the name HMS Meleager, after Meleager, who could have been a Macedonian officer of distinction in the service of Alexander the Great, or Meleager, a character from Greek mythology.

- HMS Meleager (1785) was a 32-gun fifth-rate frigate launched in 1785 and wrecked in 1801.
- HMS Meleager (1806) was a 36-gun fifth-rate frigate launched in 1806 and wrecked in 1808.
