= Leochares =

4th-century BC Greek sculptor

Leochares /liːˈɒkəriːz/ (Greek: Λεοχάρης or Λεωχάρης) was an ancient Greek sculptor from Athens, who lived in the 4th century BC.

== Works ==
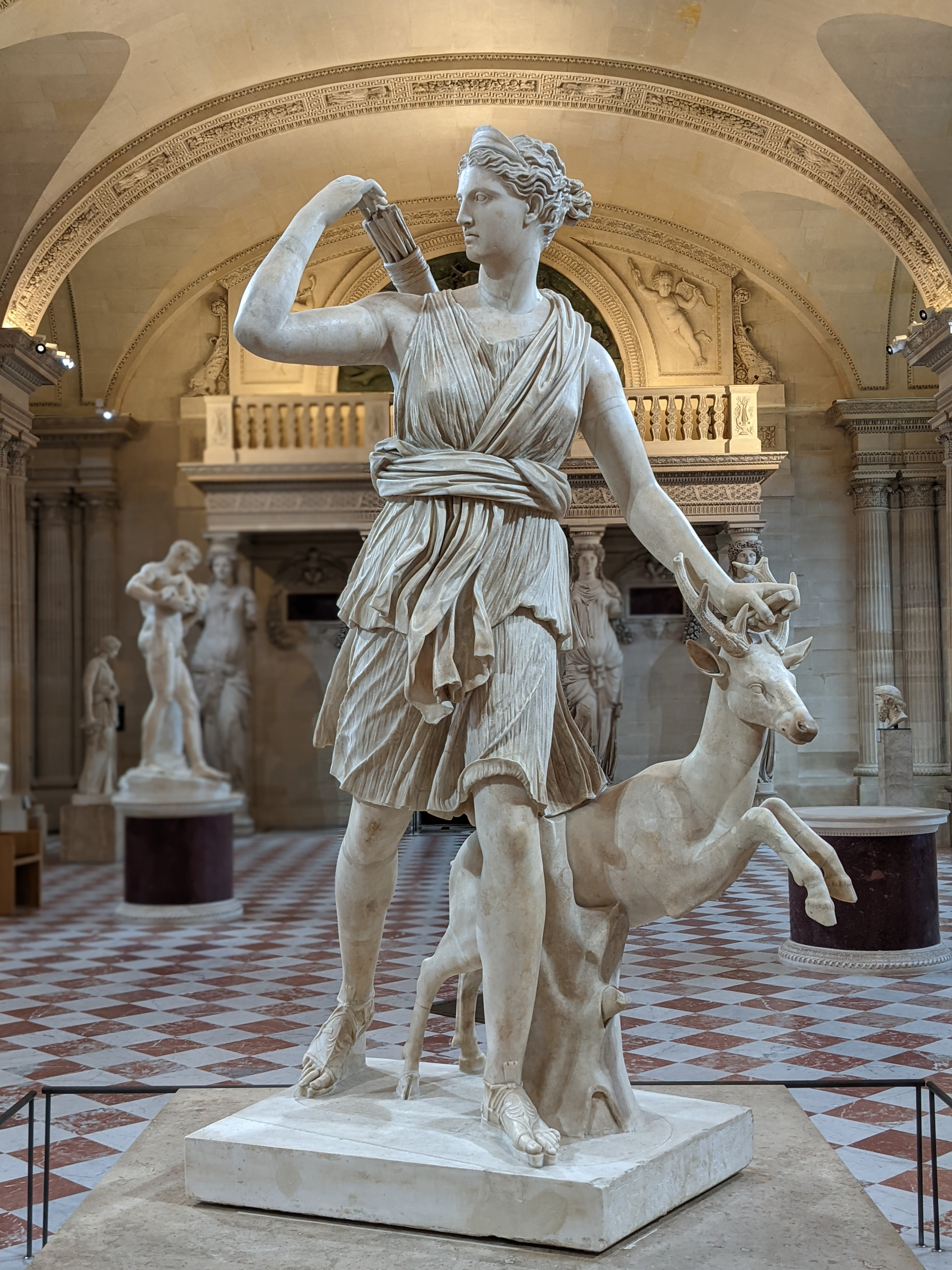
Diana of Versailles

Leochares worked at the construction of the Mausoleum of Mausolos at Halicarnassus, one of the "Seven Wonders of the Ancient World". The Diana of Versailles is a Roman copy of his original (c. 325 BC). He is also thought to be the creator of the celebrated Apollo Belvedere, of which a Roman copy is currently housed in Vatican City.

Of his portrait-statues, the most celebrated were those of Philip, Alexander, Amyntas III, Olympias, and Eurydice I, which were made of ivory and gold, and were placed in the Philippeion, a circular building in the Altis at Olympia, erected by Philip II of Macedon in celebration of his victory at Battle of Chaeronea (338 BC).

He also sculpted Ganymede and the Eagle, of which the Vatican statue is thought to be a recreation. Historically, Tatian found the statue offensive for its depiction of Greek masculinity as effeminate.
