= Pier Jacopo Alari Bonacolsi =

Italian sculptor

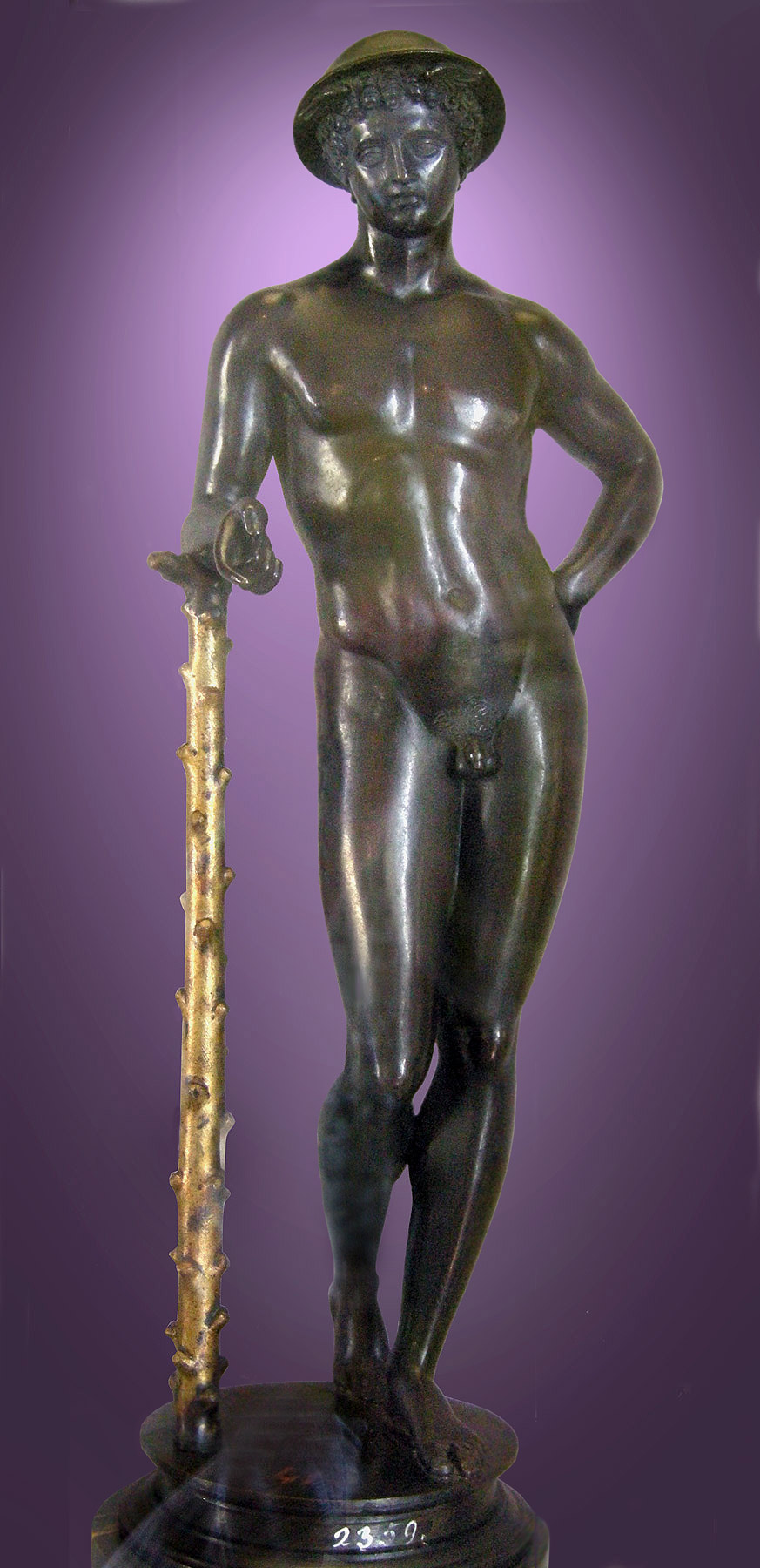
Antico: Mercury. Bargello Museum, Florence.

Pier Jacopo Alari Bonacolsi (c. 1460–1528), called L'Antico by his contemporaries, and often Antico in English, the nickname given for the refined interpretation of the Antique they recognized in his work, was a 15th- and 16th-century Italian Renaissance sculptor, known for his finely detailed small bronzes all'Antica—coolly classicizing, often with gilded details, and silver-inlaid eyes, a refinement that is found in some classical and Hellenistic Greek bronzes.

== Life ==
There is very little documentation of Bonacolsi, in spite of the aristocratic name he bore, that of the signori of Mantua who preceded the Gonzaga until 1328. Born probably in Gazzuolo, near Mantua, he may have been trained as a goldsmith, like his only rival in Mantua, Andrea Riccio. He found patronage among the Gonzaga, at first in the court that gathered at Gazzuolo around the natural son and favorite of the marquis of Mantua, Ludovico Gonzaga, Gianfrancesco, and his wife Antonia del Balzo, whose wedding in 1479 was commemorated in a pair of medallions by Bonacolsi. Gianfrancesco had recently come into possession of the fief, and a refined court gathered round the young couple, of personalities both intellectual and artistic: Ludovico Ariosto, Bernardo Tasso, Matteo Bandello, Baldassare Castiglione and l'Antico. At Gazzuolo the parish church became the burial place of the Gonzaga: there Pico della Mirandola is also interred.

Bonacolsi found patrons after 1490 above all in the brilliant court at Mantua of Isabella d'Este, who married Francesco II Gonzaga in that year. In Mantua one of Renaissance Italy's finest collections of Roman sculptures and antiquities was to be found. Bonacolsi made many small reductions of Roman sculptures as well as improvising upon the themes and styles of Antiquity. His well-knit cleanly defined torsos recall the art of Andrea Mantegna, the giant artistic personality of contemporary Mantua.

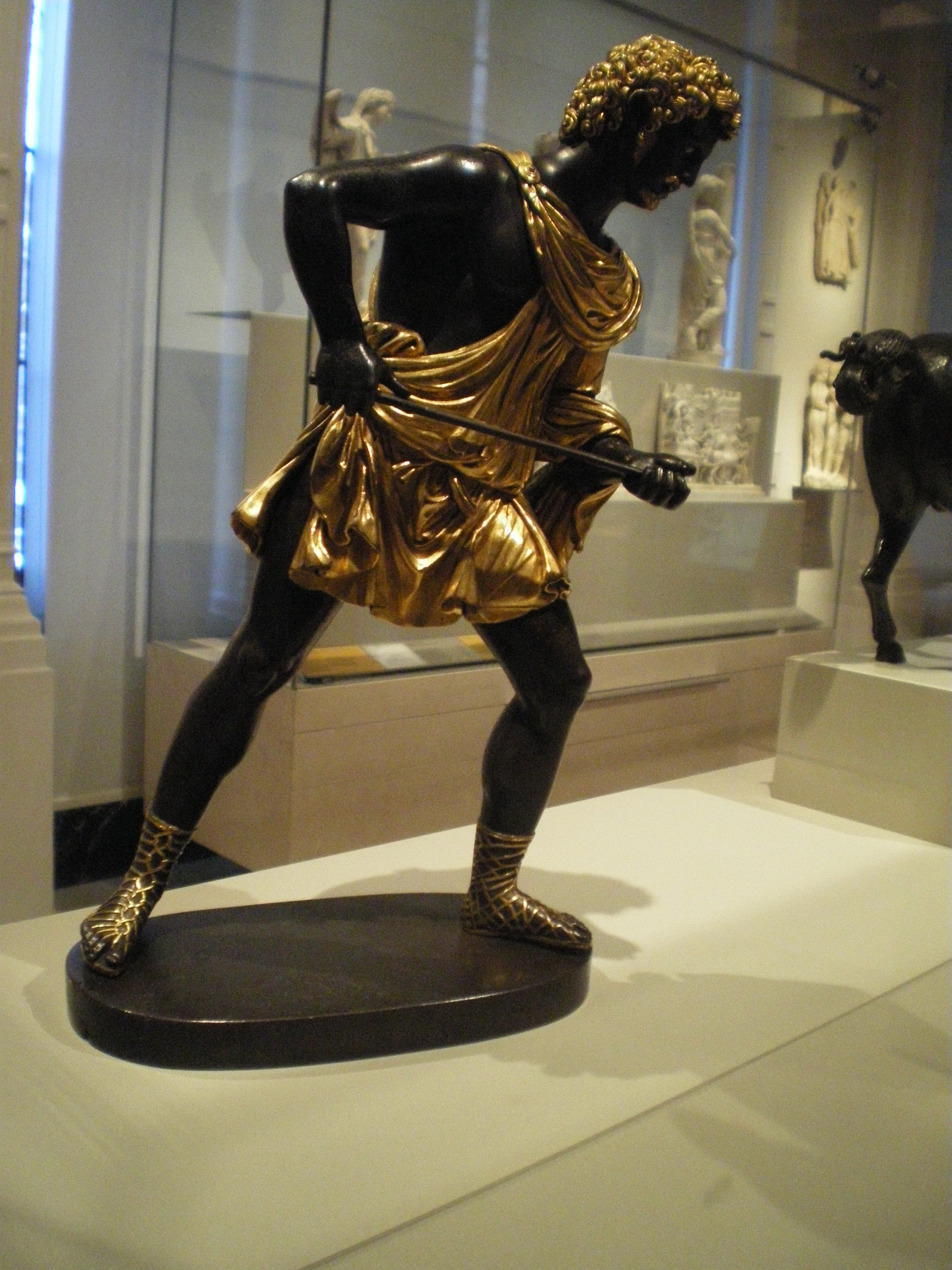
Meleager, part-gilded bronze with silver-inlaid eyes, presaging the elegant and androgynous aesthetic of Mannerism (Victoria and Albert Museum)

His bronzes were remarkable for their extremely fine facture, meticulously cast and finely cleaned and finished. His black patination is characteristic. He was the first sculptor to realize the value of casting replicas of his bronzes by preserving his refined wax originals. His cool, refined, slightly precious works were designed for close appreciation in the privacy of a courtly studiolo.

Bonacolsi also worked as a restorer. On one of the marble horses of the Dioscuri on the Quirinal in Rome his signature is discreetly inscribed. His trip to Rome, where he was able to study the Apollo Belvedere at firsthand, is his only known venture outside Mantua.

He died at Gazzuolo in 1528.

An exhibition of L'Antico's work was held at the Frick Collection, New York, in 2012.

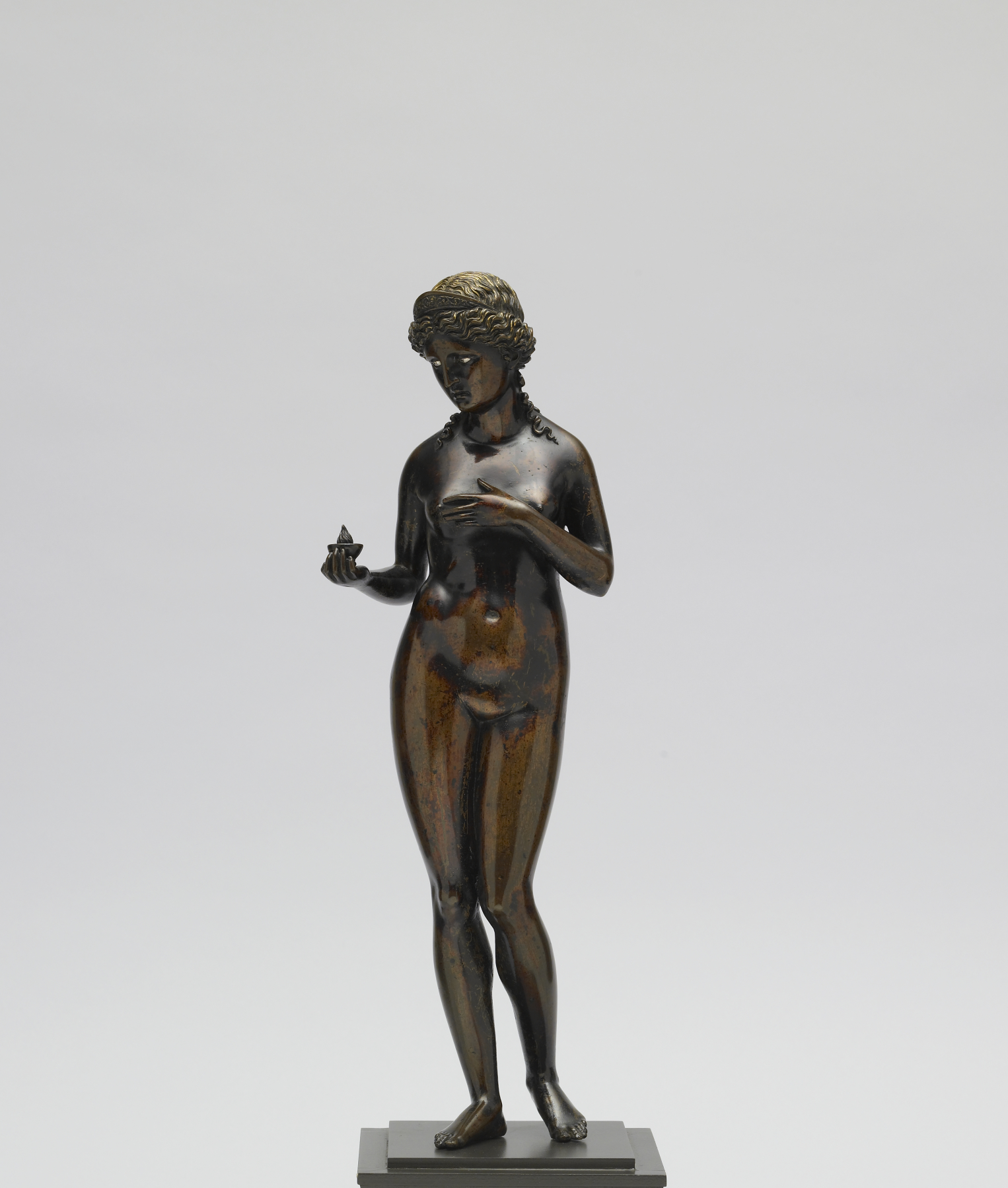
Venus Caritas, Venus as spiritual love (Walters Art Museum)

== Representative works ==
- Medallions of Gianfrancesco Gonzaga and of Antonia del Balzo his wife, 1479, National Gallery, Washington.
- Gonzaga Vase, 1481, Galleria Estense, Modena.
- Hercules and the Lernaean Hydra, part-gilded bronze medallion, of one of a series celebrating Hercules, probably to flatter Ercole d'Este (died 1505), Bargello Museum, Florence. Five more from the sequence are in Vienna, and two at the Victoria and Albert Museum.
- Victoria and Albert Museum, c. 1484-1490, Meleager, bronze, part-gilded. The complementary figure of the boar is missing.
- Eros, 1490, if, as has been supposed, it was made as a wedding gift to Isabella d'Este, Bargello Museum, Florence.
- Apollo Belvedere, bronze, part-gilded, Justus Liebighaus, Frankfurt. The Apollo Belvedere was moved to the Cortile del Belvedere in the Vatican in 1509. Before that time it was in the personal collection of Pope Julius II, where L'Antico may have had access to it. There are other examples of this sculpture in the Fitzwilliam Museum, Cambridge and in the Ca' d'Oro, Venice.
- Venus Felix c. 1495, Kunsthistorisches Museum, Vienna. A reinterpretation rather than a reproduction.
- Hercules, 1496, bronze, silver inlays, Museo Arqueológico Nacional, Madrid.
- Hercules, probably 1499, bronze part-gilded, silver inlays, Frick Museum, New York.
- Seated Paris, c. 1500, Metropolitan Museum.
- Mercury, c.1500-1511, Bargello Museum, Florence.
- Cupid, firing an arrow, c. 1519, Rijksmuseum.
- Bust of a Young Man, c. 1520, J. Paul Getty Museum.
- Venus Caritas, c. 1520-1523, bronze with gilding and silver inlay, Walters Art Museum.
- Young Hercules, Louvre Museum.
