= Meleager (disambiguation) =

Meleager is a figure of Greek mythology.

- Meleager (L'Antico sculpture), a Renaissance bronze sculpture of Meleager, based on a classical marble sculpture
- Meleager of Skopas, a lost bronze sculpture by Skopas of Paros

Meleager, the English transliteration of the Ancient Greek: Mελέαγρος, may also refer to:

- Meleager (general) (fl. 335–323 BC), an officer of Alexander the Great
- Meleager (king) (fl. 279 BC), a ruler of the Ptolemaic dynasty
- Meleager of Gadara (fl. 1st century BC), the first of a number of collectors of the literary epigrams known today as the Greek Anthology
- HMS Meleager, two ships of the Royal Navy
