= HMS Meleager (1785) =

Frigate of the Royal Navy

History

Great Britain
- Name: HMS Meleager
- Namesake: Meleager
- Builder: Greaves & Nickolson, Frindsbury, Kent
- Launched: 1785
- Fate: Wrecked 9 June 1801

General characteristics
- Class & type: Amazon-class
- Type: Fifth-rate frigate
- Tons burthen: 68248/94 (bm)
- Length: 126 ft (38 m) (o/a); 104 ft (31.7 m) (keel)
- Beam: 35 ft 1 in (10.7 m)
- Depth: 12 ft 2 in (3.7 m)
- Armament: 32 guns

HMS Meleager was a 32-gun Amazon-class frigate that Greaves and Nickolson built in 1785 at the Quarry House yard in Frindsbury, Kent, England. She served during the French Revolutionary Wars until 1801, when she was wrecked in the Gulf of Mexico.

== Career ==
Captain Charles Tyler took command of Meleager in 1790.

In 1793 Lieutenant Thomas Masterman Hardy served aboard her. Meleager was among the vessels that shared in the capture, on 5 August 1793, cf the Prince Royal of Sweden.

Meleager was part of the fleet under Lord Hood that occupied Toulon in August 1793. With HMS Courageux, Robust, Tartar and Egmont, she covered the landing, on 27 August, of 1500 troops sent to remove the republicans occupying the forts guarding the port. Once the forts were secure, the remainder of Hood's fleet, accompanied by 17 Spanish ships-of-the-line that had just arrived, sailed into the harbour.

On 16 November she and Romulus captured the French gunboat Ca Ira.

In 1794 Sir George Cockburn commanded her. In early 1794 she was among the British vessels present when Sir David Dundas captured the town of San Fiorenzo (San Fiurenzu) in the Gulf of St. Florent in Corsica. There the British found the French frigate Minerve on 19 February 1794, and were able to refloat her. They then took her into service as a 38-gun frigate under the name St Fiorenzo. Meleager shared in the prize money for both St Fiorenzo and for the naval stores captured in the town.

In April Juno captured the Mars (3 April) and Aurora (15 April) in the presence of Courageux, Berwick, St George, and Meleager.

Next, she took part in the Battle of Genoa (14 March 1795), and the fight at Hyeres (12 May 1795). Meleager was among the vessels that shared in the prize money for the Ça Ira, Censeur, and Expedition (formerly Speedy), captured during or after the raid on Genoa. The British returned Speedy to service. Around this time Meleager was among the vessels that shared in the capture of the Genoese vessel Fortuna and the tartane Concezione. They also captured the Genoese and Venetian polacres and luggers Madona del Grazzie e Consolazione, Volante de Dio, Madona del Grazzie de Padua, Buena Forte and another small vessel.

In 1796, Meleager was part of a squadron off the coast of Genoa under the command of Captain Horatio Nelson. Nelson, in Agamemnon, led Meleager, Blanche (32 guns), Diadem (64 guns) and the 16-gun brig-sloop Speedy.

On 31 May 1796, the squadron chased six French vessels that Nelson believed were bringing supplies from Toulon, to be landed at St. Piere d'Acena, for the Siege of Mantua. The vessels took shelter under the guns of a battery. Meleager then led Agamemnon and the rest of the Nelson's squadron in close where the boats of the squadron could capture the French vessels, which they did. In the action, Agamemnon had one man killed and two men wounded, and Blanche had one man wounded. The French prizes consisted of two warships and five transports:

- ketch Genie of three 18-pounders, four swivel guns and 60 men;
- gunboat Numero Douzel of one 18-pounder, four swivels and 30 men;
- brig Bonne-Mere of 250 tons burthen, transporting brass 24-pounder guns, 13" mortars and gun-carriages;
- ketch Verge de Consolation of 120 tons, transporting brass guns, mortars, shells and gun-carriages;
- ketch Jean Baptiste of 100 tons, carrying brandy and some bread;
- ketch of unknown name of 100 tons, carrying Austrian prisoners; and
- ketch St. Anne de Paix, of 70 tons, transporting wheelbarrows and entrenching tools. The British destroyed the vessel.

On 24 December 1796, Meleager, Niger, Lively and Fortune captured the Spanish vessel Mejor Amigo. On 2 January 1797, the same vessels plus Raven captured Nostra Senora de la Misericordia. That same day the same vessels captured the French privateer Foudroyant, for which head money was paid in August 1801.

Also in early 1797, Meleager was in company with these British vessels and some others when they captured the Spanish ship San Francisco, which was sold in Lisbon. On 30 January Meleager was among the eleven vessels that shared in the capture of the Purissima Conception.

Then on 25 February, Meleager, under Captain Charles Ogle, and Thalia captured the Spanish ship Santa Catalina. At some point Meleager captured the Spanish ships St. Natalia and Cartada, alias Cubana. In May 1798, Meleager received the net proceeds of an insurance of £3000 on the Spanish ship Teresa, which she had captured on 21 February 1797.

Meleager transferred to the Jamaica station, where she served in the squadron under Admiral Sir Hyde Parker. In June 1799 she captured a Spanish settee carrying sugar from Veracruz to Cádiz. On 23 and 24 July Meleager was in company with Greyhound when they captured the Spanish vessels Virgin D'Regla, Jesus Maria, and Jose.

Between end-July and end-October 1799 Meleager and Greyhound captured five more Spanish vessels:

- ship Santa Anna, of 12 guns, 24 men, 320 tons, sailing from Havana to Veracruz with a cargo of wine, wax, tar and the like;
- cutter Vecourso, of two guns, 12 men and 50 tons, sailing from Nantes to Veracruz with a cargo of steel, bale goods and the like.
- brig Animas sailing from Havana to Veracuz with a cargo of brandy, bales, etc.
- schooner Saint Juan Baptiste sailing from Cádiz to Veracruz with a cargo of wine and cloth.
- settee Saint Miguel y la Virgin de Regla sailing from Cádiz to Veracruz with a cargo of paper, oil, etc.

Alone, Meleager also captured a Dutch schooner sailing from Jacmel to Curaçao with a cargo of coffee.

Between end-October 1799 and 20 February 1800, Meleager took a number of prizes:

- Dutch schooner Minette of ten men and 40 tons, sailing with coffee from Jacmel to Curaçao;
- Danish schooner Hazard, of 12 men and 40 tons, sailing from Aux Cayes to St Thomas with coffee; and
- French schooner Virgin, of 30 tons, sailing from Aux Cayes to St Thomas with coffee and rum.

Meleager destroyed a number of the quite small vessels sailing from Aux Cayes to St Thomas:

- French schooner of ten tons with rum;
- French boat with rum;
- French sloop with rum;
- French schooner with coffee; and
- Spanish schooner, of 40 tons, sailing in ballast.

Then she took as prizes:

- Spanish schooner, of 50 tons, sailing in ballast; and
- Spanish Schooner Aimable Marie, of 22 men, 110 tons, sailing from Cádiz to Veracruz with bale goods.

Together with Crescent she captured:

- Spanish vessel St. Francisco, sailing from Cuba to St. Martha with bale goods;
- Spanish vessel Nostra Senora de los Dolores, sailing from Portobelo to Cartagena with tobacco and copper; and
- Spanish vessel Nostra Senora del Carmen, sailing from Saint-Domingue to Cartagena with naval stores.

Between 28 February and 20 May, Meleager captured two small vessels:

- Spanish xebec Pacaro; and
- Spanish brig Maiste, sailing from Veracruz with copper, hides, and soap.

Between 20 May and 3 August 1800, Meleager captured further vessels. First, she detained the American ship Gadson, which was sailing from Porto Cavello to Charleston with indigo, coffee, and tobacco. Then with Crescent and Nimrod she took a Spanish felucca sailing from Havana to Veracruz and a Spanish xebec sailing from Campeche to Havana.

Next, Meleager took four more vessels:

- American ship Diana, sailing from Veracruz to New York, with cochineal and sugar;
- English schooner Flora, sailing from Veracruz with specie;
- Spanish schooner Bella Johannah, sailing from Campeche to Porto Cavello with Mahogany;
- American brig Leopard, sailing from Boston to Havana with iron.

Captain John Perkins was made post-captain in Meleager in 1800 (Ogle was still Captain when she contacted USS Ganges on 24 January, and Perkins was Captain when contacted by USS Augusta on 21 August) on the Jamaica station but less than a year later, in 1801, she came under the command of Thomas Bladen Capel.

== Fate ==
On 9 June 1801 Capel and Meleager were cruising Bahia del Campeche in the Gulf of Mexico when just before midnight lookouts spotted breakers ahead. Even though the helmsman tried to turn her, Meleager ran hard onto a reef. Despite their best efforts, the crew could neither pull Meleager off the reef nor could the pumps keep up with the water coming in. The crew put provisions in the boats and then abandoned ship before she sank. The boats sailed to Vera Cruz. Here, in mid-July, Apollo picked the crew up. The subsequent court martial ruled that the wreck was due to the charts on Meleager being greatly in error with respect to the location of the Triangles Shoal on which she had run aground.
