= Wing of a European Roller =

Watercolour by Albrecht Dürer, 1500 or 1512

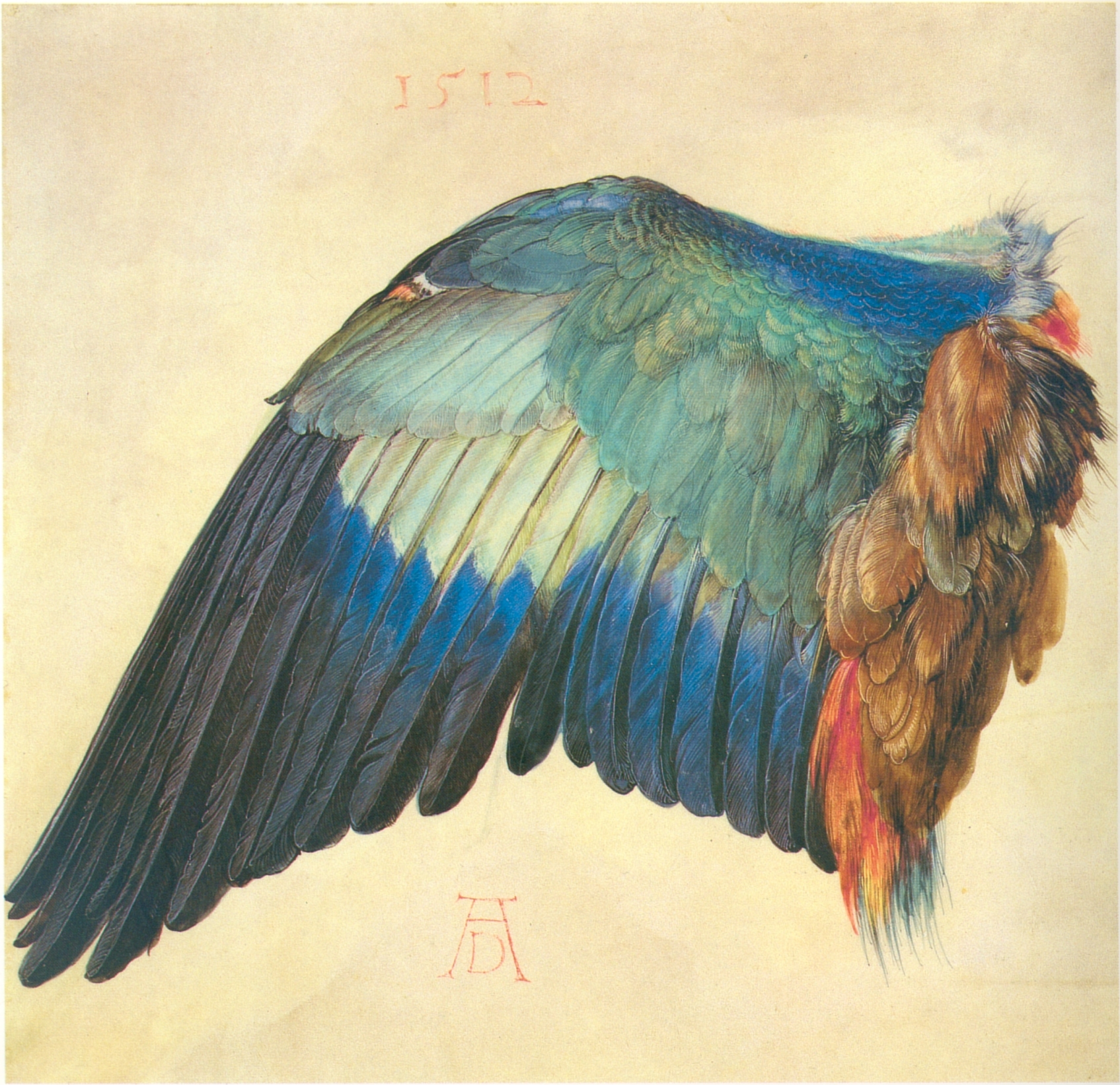
- Artist: Albrecht Dürer
- Year: 1512
- Type: Watercolor and body color on vellum
- Dimensions: 19.6 cm × 20 cm (7.7 in × 7.9 in)
- Location: Albertina; Vienna

Wing of a European Roller (also known as Wing of a Blue Roller) is a nature study watercolor by Albrecht Dürer. Dürer painted it from a dead specimen in 1512.

== Description ==
The watercolor's dimensions are 19.6 x 20 centimeters. It is in the collection of the Albertina, Vienna. In 2013, the Wing of a European Roller was loaned with other Dürer works, to the National Gallery of Art, Washington.

== See also ==
- List of paintings by Albrecht Dürer
