= Meleager (L'Antico sculpture) =

Italian Renaissance sculpture

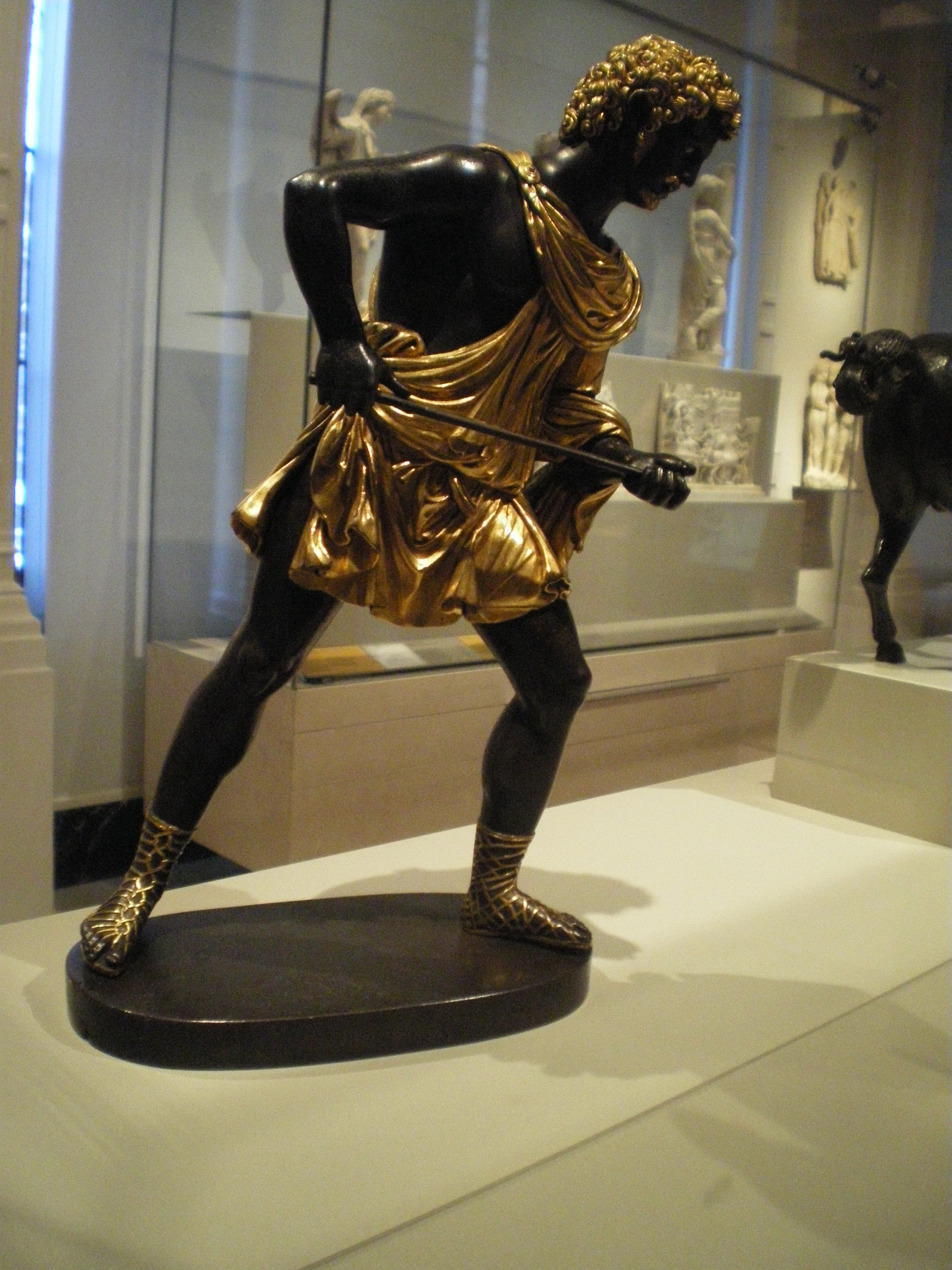
- Artist: Pier Jacopo Alari Bonacolsi
- Year: c. 1484–1490
- Type: Bronze sculpture
- Subject: Mythological figure Meleager
- Dimensions: 33 cm (13 in)
- Weight: 4.74 kg (10.4 lb)
- Location: Victoria and Albert Museum

Meleager is a bronze sculpture of the mythological figure Meleager by the Italian Renaissance sculptor Pier Jacopo Alari Bonacolsi, known by his contemporaries as l'Antico, and to art history as Antico. The sculpture is now in the Victoria and Albert Museum in London.

== The sculpture ==
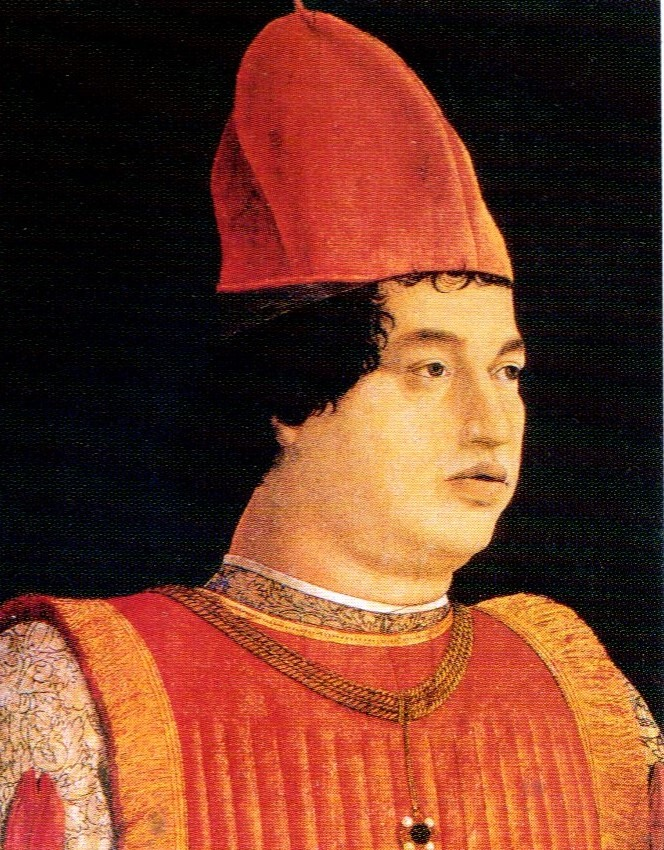
Portrait of Gianfrancesco Gonzaga, in whose possession Meleager is likely to have been in 1496.

The sculpture was made c. 1484–1490 in Mantua in Italy, by the leading sculptor Pier Jacopo Alari Bonacolsi, known by his contemporaries as L'Antico. It is in cast bronze, part-gilded and with silver inlaid eyes. The sculpture measures 33 cm (13 in) high from the bronze base, and weighs 4.74 kg (10.4 lb).

It shows the mythological figure of Meleager, who was the heir to the throne of Calydon, a city in Greece. The goddess Artemis was offended by Meleager's father, Oeneus, and so she sent a monstrous boar to attack the fields that supplied the city with food. Meleager is shown in the sculpture poised with a weapon about to spear the boar. The weapon is part-missing, broken at some time in the past, and the boar is completely missing - it may never have been part of the sculpture as the base has no space to accommodate it.

The design is known to have been based on a classical marble statue. At one time this marble was in the Renaissance Belvedere in Rome. By 1638 it was displayed in the Uffizi in Florence, where it was known as the "Contadino" or "Villano" ("the peasant"). The marble statue was destroyed on 12 August 1762 by a fire and resulting partial roof collapse at the Uffizi.

Meleager is probably the "figure of metal called the little peasant" ("il villanello") listed in an inventory dated to 1496. This list of possessions was made following the death of Gianfrancesco Gonzaga of Bozzolo, the third son of Marchese Ludovico Gonzaga of Mantua. L'Antico was court artist to three generations of the Gonzaga family.

== Recent history ==
The sculpture was bought "on a hunch" by the art dealer Horace Baxter at "an obscure auction" in Kent for £16. He took the sculpture to the Victoria and Albert Museum, where it was immediately recognised by the curator and art historian John Pope-Hennessy as a major Renaissance work. Baxter sold the sculpture to the V&A Museum in 1960 for £4,000, a little under the then market value.

The sculpture was featured in the second episode of the BBC series Secrets of the Museum, first shown in March 2020, which looked at behind-the-scenes work on the collections of the V&A Museum. It showed how it has to be kept under very strict environmental conditions as the bronze is suffering from bronze disease.

== Gallery ==
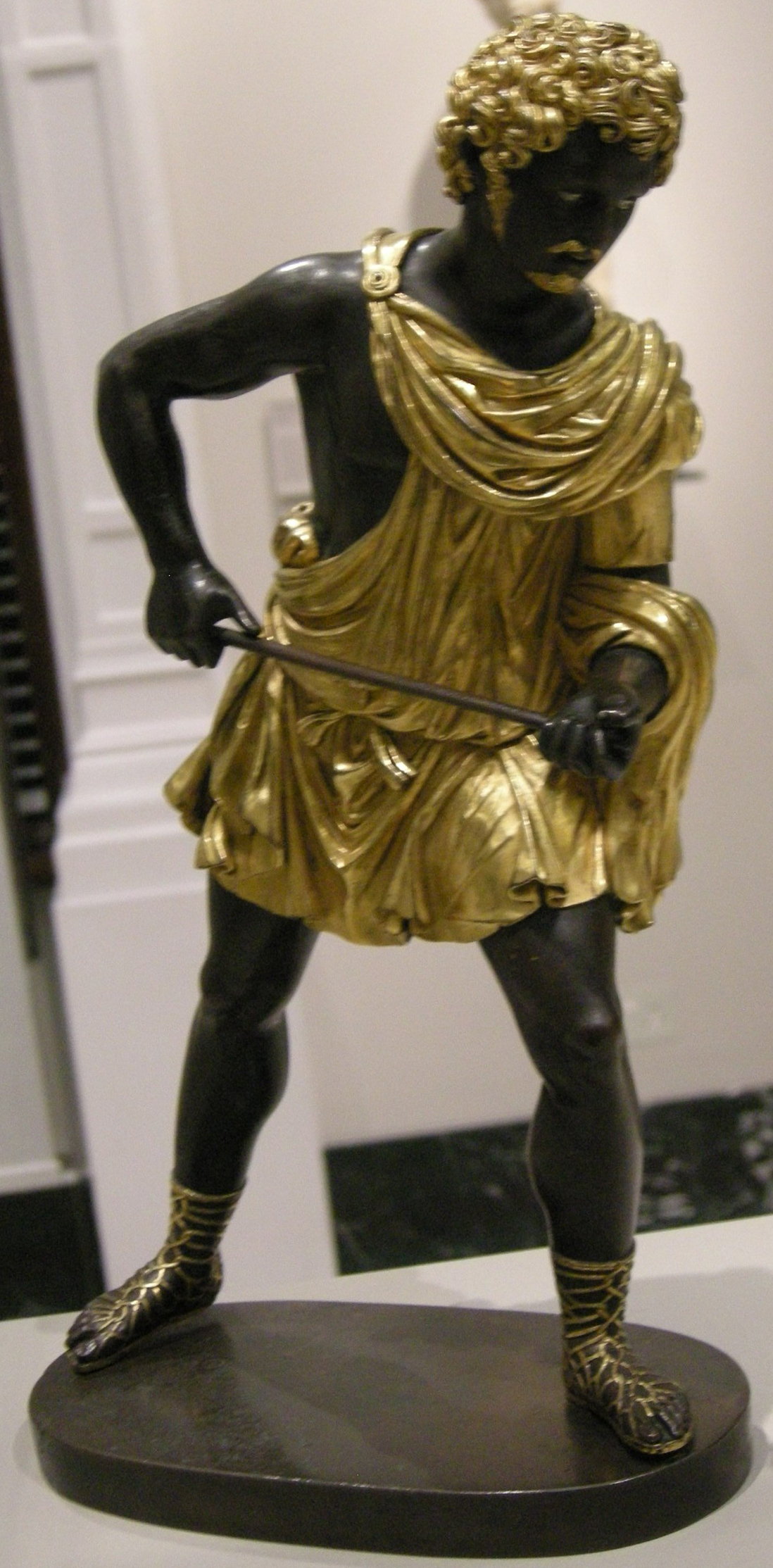
Meleager
