= Battle of the Hyères Islands order of battle =

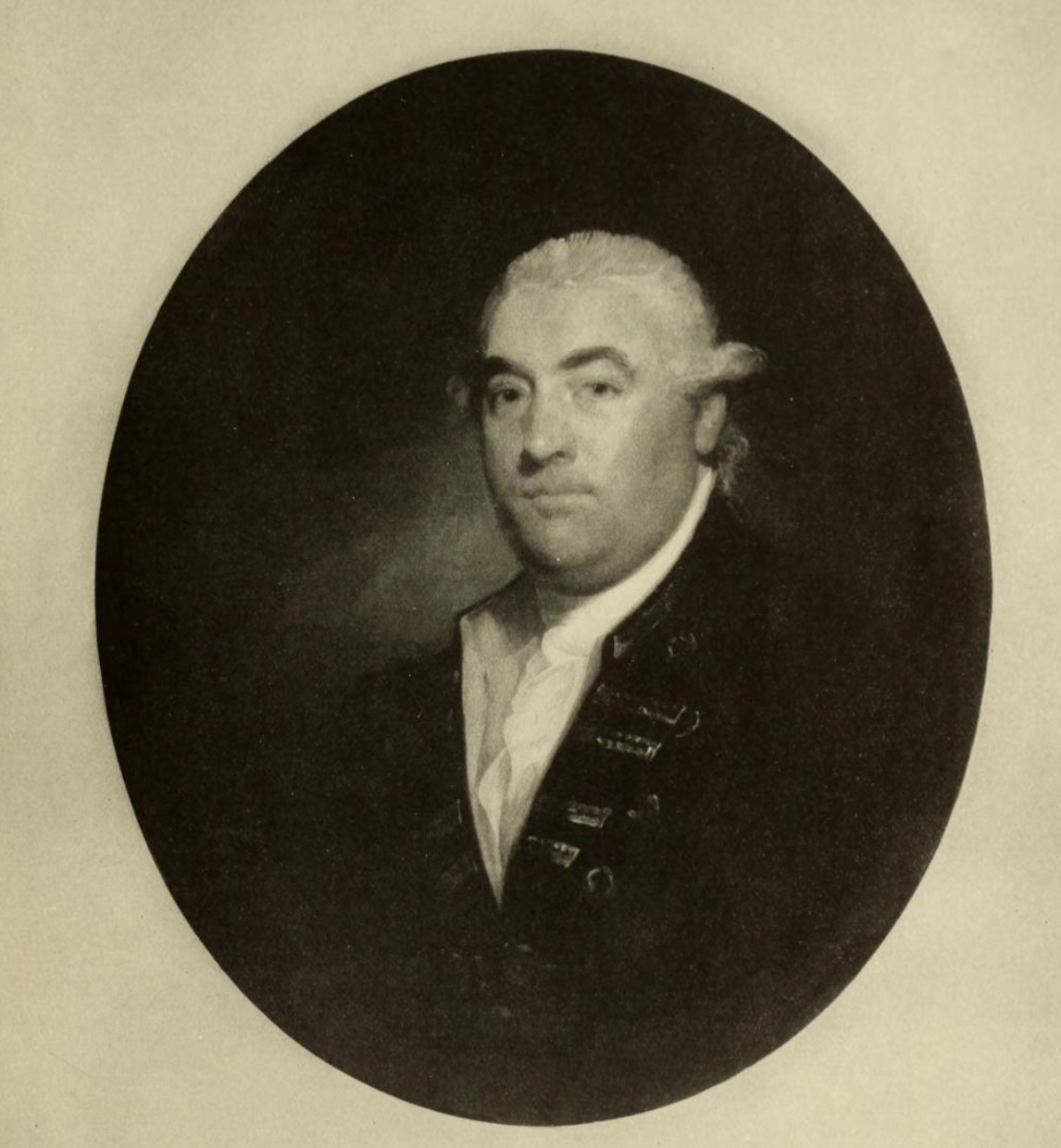
William Hotham, the British commander at the battle

The Battle of the Hyères Islands order of battle lists the British and French fleets which participated in a campaign off the Îles d'Hyères during the French Revolutionary Wars. The Battle of the Hyères Islands was an engagement fought for control of the Ligurian Sea, the waters off the Southern French and Northwestern Italian coasts, where British and French forces had clashed since the outbreak of the French Revolutionary Wars in 1793. The battle was an uneven contest, the French, led by Vice-admiral Pierre Martin unwilling to face the larger British fleet under Admiral William Hotham, but losing one ship of the line to British fire as they attempted to escape.

The British had been dominant in the Mediterranean since the destruction of half of the French Mediterranean Fleet at the conclusion of the Siege of Toulon in December 1793. As the French strove to repair and rebuilt their shattered fleet, the British turned to securing the island of Corsica, through an invasion in 1794. The only French naval operation of the year, a cruise by Martin in June, was forced to shelter in the anchorage at Gourjean Bay to avoid destruction. In March 1795 the French had enough serviceable ships to take to sea once more, sailing in the Gulf of Genoa and capturing the damaged HMS Berwick at the action of 8 March 1795. A few days later Hotham's fleet caught the French and Martin lost two ships at the ensuing Battle of Genoa. During the spring both fleets gained reinforcements from the Atlantic, and in June Martin sailed once more.

Hotham was not initially concerned by French movements, but on 7 July a squadron under Captain Horatio Nelson was chased by the French and Nelson led Martin directly to Hotham's anchorage at San Fiorenzo. Hotham delayed departure but eventually gave chase, pursuing Martin's smaller fleet across the Ligurian Sea. On 13 July off the Îles d'Hyères, the leading British ships caught the trailing French ships and a short battle followed during which the French ship of the line Alcide was isolated, captured and subsequently destroyed by fire. Martin retreated to Fréjus while Hotham, his flagship trailing 8 nautical miles (15 km) behind the action, ordered his ships to pull back. This decision was criticised by his officers at the time and by subsequent historians, and his failure to inflict a decisive defeat on the French at this engagement is often cited as crucial in the forced evacuation of the Mediterranean by all British forces the following year.

== Hotham's fleet ==
Note that as carronades were not traditionally taken into consideration when calculating a ship's rate, these ships may have been carrying more guns than indicated below.

- British Royal Navy
- Navy of the Kingdom of Naples
- Ships in this colour were destroyed or captured during the campaign

Admiral William Hotham's fleet
Ship	Rate	Guns	Fleet	Commander	Casualties			Notes
Ship	Rate	Guns	Fleet	Commander	Killed	Wounded	Total	Notes
HMS Britannia	First rate	100	Royal Navy	Admiral William Hotham; Captain John Holloway	0	0	0	Not engaged.
HMS Victory	First rate	100	Royal Navy	Rear-Admiral Robert Mann; Captain John Knight	5	15	20	Heavy engaged. Damage to rigging and sails.
HMS Princess Royal	Second rate	98	Royal Navy	Vice-Admiral Samuel Goodall; Captain John Child Purvis	0	0	0	Not engaged.
HMS St George	Second rate	98	Royal Navy	Vice-Admiral Sir Hyde Parker; Captain Thomas Foley	0	0	0	Not engaged.
HMS Windsor Castle	Second rate	98	Royal Navy	Rear-Admiral Robert Linzee; Captain John Gore	0	0	0	Not engaged.
HMS Blenheim	Second rate	98	Royal Navy	Captain John Bazely	2	2	4	Lightly engaged.
HMS Gibraltar	Third rate	80	Royal Navy	Captain John Pakenham	0	0	0	Not engaged.
HMS Captain	Third rate	74	Royal Navy	Captain Samuel Reeve	1	0	1	Lightly engaged.
HMS Fortitude	Third rate	74	Royal Navy	Captain William Young	0	0	0	Not engaged.
HMS Bombay Castle	Third rate	74	Royal Navy	Captain Charles Chamberlayne	0	0	0	Not engaged.
HMS Saturn	Third rate	74	Royal Navy	Captain James Douglas	0	0	0	Not engaged.
HMS Cumberland	Third rate	74	Royal Navy	Captain Bartholomew Rowley	0	0	0	Heavily engaged. Damage to rigging and sails.
HMS Terrible	Third rate	74	Royal Navy	Captain George Campbell	0	0	0	Not engaged.
HMS Defence	Third rate	74	Royal Navy	Captain Thomas Wells	1	6	7	Lightly engaged.
HMS Egmont	Third rate	74	Royal Navy	Captain John Sutton	0	0	0	Not engaged.
HMS Culloden	Third rate	74	Royal Navy	Captain Thomas Troubridge	2	5	7	Heavily engaged. Damage to rigging and sails.
HMS Bedford	Third rate	74	Royal Navy	Captain Davidge Gould	0	0	0	Not engaged.
HMS Courageux	Third rate	74	Royal Navy	Captain Benjamin Hallowell	0	0	0	Not engaged.
HMS Audacious	Third rate	74	Royal Navy	Captain William Shield	0	0	0	Not engaged.
Guiscardo	Third rate	74	Kingdom of Naples		0	0	0	Not engaged.
Samnito	Third rate	74	Kingdom of Naples		0	0	0	Not engaged.
HMS Agamemnon	Third rate	64	Royal Navy	Captain Horatio Nelson	0	0	0	Lightly engaged.
HMS Diadem	Third rate	64	Royal Navy	Captain Charles Tyler	0	0	0	Not engaged.
HMS Meleager	Fifth rate	32	Royal Navy	Captain George Cockburn	0	0	0	Not engaged.
HMS Cyclops	Fifth rate	28	Royal Navy	Captain William Hotham	0	0	0	Not engaged.
HMS Ariadne	Sixth rate	24	Royal Navy	Captain Robert Plampin	0	0	0	Not engaged.
HMS Comet	Brig	14	Royal Navy		0	0	0	Not engaged.
HMS Eclair	Brig	20	Royal Navy		0	0	0	Not engaged.
HMS Fleche	Brig	14	Royal Navy	Commander Thomas Boys	0	0	0	Not engaged.
HMS Resolution	Cutter	14	Royal Navy	Lieutenant Edward H. Columbine	0	0	0	Not engaged.
Total casualties: 11 killed, 27 wounded
Sources: James, pp. 267–271.

== Martin's fleet ==
Note that the number of guns refers to the official complement, traditionally taken into consideration when calculating a ship's rate, and that these ships may have been carrying more guns than indicated below, although obusiers were not carried on French ships in this battle. Officers killed in action are marked with a † symbol.

- Ships in this colour were destroyed during the campaign

Vice-amiral Martin's fleet
Ship	Rate	Guns	Fleet	Commander	Casualties			Notes
Ship	Rate	Guns	Fleet	Commander	Killed	Wounded	Total	Notes
Sans Culotte	First rate	120	French Navy	Vice-amiral Pierre Martin; Captain Lapalisse; Représentant Joseph Niou	None			Not engaged.
Tonnant	Third rate	80	French Navy	Contre-amiral Jean-Louis Delmotte; Captain Julien Cosmao-Kerjulien	None			Not engaged.
Victoire	Third rate	80	French Navy	Captain Daniel Savary	None			Not engaged.
Généreux	Third rate	74	French Navy	Captain Louis	Unknown			Heavily engaged.
Heureux	Third rate	74	French Navy	Captain Charles Lacaille	None			Not engaged.
Barra	Third rate	74	French Navy	Captain André Maureau	None			Not engaged.
Guerrier	Third rate	74	French Navy	Captain Louis Infernet	None			Sent back to Toulon before the action.
Mercure	Third rate	74	French Navy	Captain Catteford	None			Sent back to Toulon before the action.
Alcide *	Third rate	74	French Navy	Captain Laurent Le Blond de Saint-Hilaire †	c. 300 killed			Heavily engaged, badly damaged and captured. Caught fire after the action with heavy loss of life.
Timoléon	Third rate	74	French Navy	Captain Charbonnier	None			Not engaged.
Duquesne	Third rate	74	French Navy	Captain Zacharie Allemand	None			Not engaged.
Peuple Souverain	Third rate	74	French Navy	Captain Lindet-Lalonde	None			Not engaged.
Berwick	Third rate	74	French Navy	Captain Dumanoir le Pelley	Unknown			Heavily engaged.
Jemmapes	Third rate	74	French Navy	Contre-amiral Jean François Renaudin; Captain Laffon	None			Not engaged.
Tyrannicide	Third rate	74	French Navy	Captain Alain Joseph Dordelin	Unknown			Heavily engaged.
Jupiter	Third rate	74	French Navy	Captain Joseph de Richery	None			Not engaged.
Révolution	Third rate	74	French Navy	Captain Fay	None			Not engaged.
Aquilon	Third rate	74	French Navy	Captain Laterre	Unknown			Heavily engaged.
Républicain	Third rate	74	French Navy	Captain Honoré Ganteaume	None			Not engaged.
Junon	Frigate	32	French Navy	Lieutenant Amand Leduc	None			Not engaged.
Friponne	Frigate	36	French Navy	Lieutenant Villeneuve	None			Not engaged.
Alceste	Frigate	32	French Navy	Lieutenant Jean Joseph Hubert	None			Not engaged.
Sérieuse	Frigate	32	French Navy	Lieutenant Saunier	None			Not engaged.
Justice	Frigate	40	French Navy	Captain Jacques Dalbarade	None			Not engaged.
Embuscade	Frigate	40	French Navy	Lieutenant Maxime Émeriau	None			Not engaged.
Félicité	Frigate	32	French Navy	Lieutenant Lecour	None			Not engaged.
Brune	Corvette	20	French Navy	Ensign Louis Gabriel Deniéport	None			Not engaged.
Badine	Brig	20	French Navy	Lieutenant Testu	None			Not engaged.
Alerte	Brig	10	French Navy	Le Mèle	None			Not engaged.
Hazard	Brig	18	French Navy	Dumay	None			Not engaged.
Scout	Brig	18	French Navy	Dumeny	None			Not engaged.
Total casualties: c. 300 killed
Sources: Troude, pp. 432–436.

== Bibliography ==
- Bennett, Geoffrey (2002) [1972]. Nelson the Commander. London: Penguin. ISBN 0-141391-29-4.
- Bradford, Ernle (1999) [1977]. Nelson: The Essential Hero. Ware: Wordsworth Military Library. ISBN 1-84022-202-6.
- Clowes, William Laird (1997) [1900]. The Royal Navy, A History from the Earliest Times to 1900, Volume III. London: Chatham Publishing. ISBN 1-86176-012-4.
- Gardiner, Robert, ed. (2001) [1996]. Fleet Battle and Blockade. London: Caxton Editions. ISBN 1-84067-363-X.
- Ireland, Bernard (2005). The Fall of Toulon: The Last Opportunity the Defeat the French Revolution. Cassell. ISBN 0-3043-6726-5.
- James, William (2002) [1827]. The Naval History of Great Britain, Volume 1, 1793–1796. London: Conway Maritime Press. ISBN 0-85177-905-0.
- Mostert, Noel (2007). The Line upon a Wind: The Greatest War Fought at Sea Under Sail 1793 – 1815. Vintage Books. ISBN 9-78071-260-9272.
- Roche, Jean-Michel (2005). Dictionnaire des bâtiments de la flotte de guerre française de Colbert à nos jours. Vol. 1. Group Retozel-Maury Millau. ISBN 978-2-9525917-0-6. OCLC 165892922. (1671-1870)
- Troude, Onésime-Joachim (1867). Batailles navales de la France (in French). Vol. 2. Challamel ainé. pp. 424–431.
