= Ganteaume's expedition of 1795 =

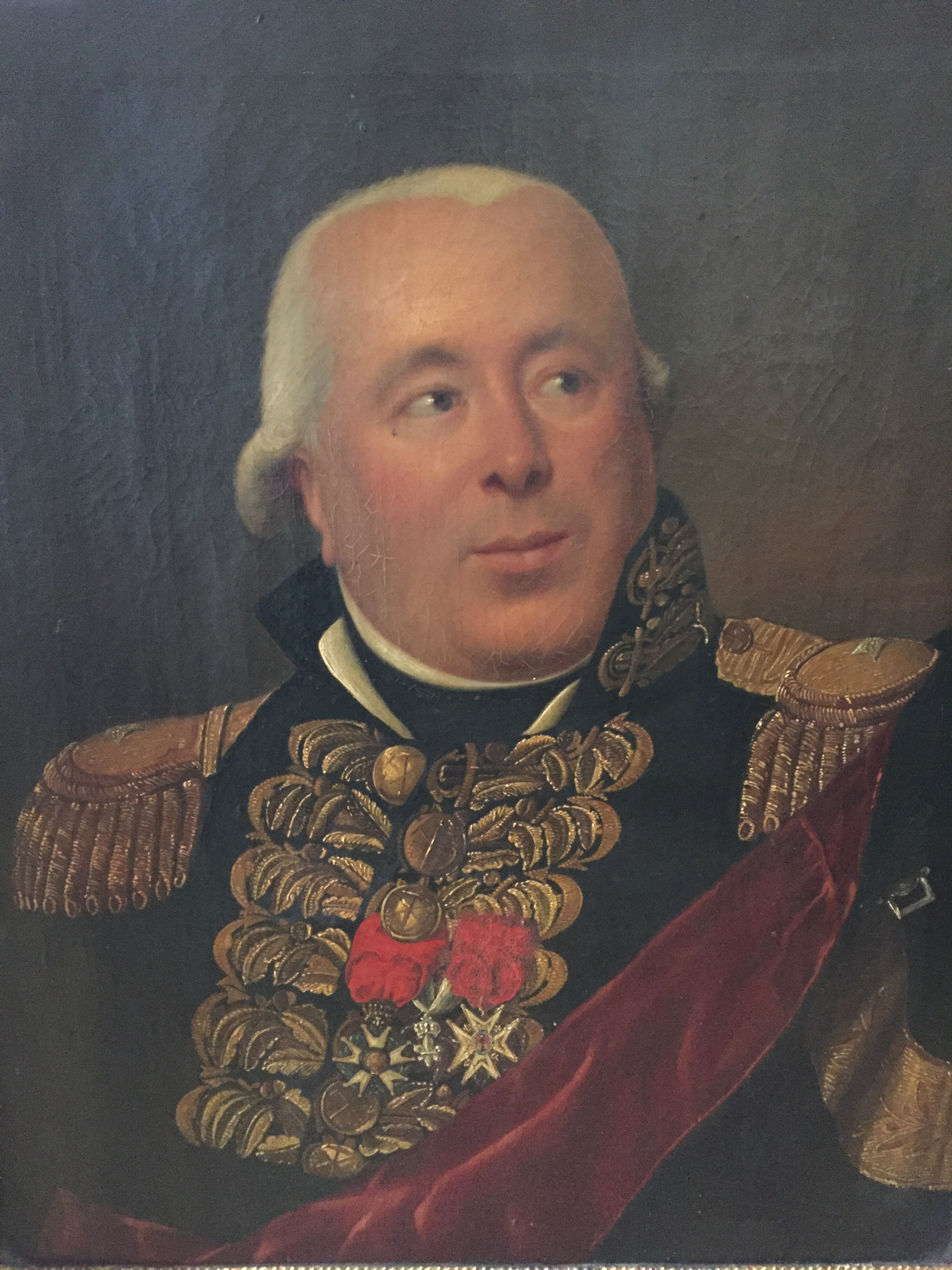
Honoré Joseph Antoine Ganteaume, the commander of the expedition

Ganteaume's expedition of 1795 was a French naval operation in the Aegean Sea in the autumn of 1795 during the French Revolutionary Wars. Commanded by Commodore Honoré Joseph Antoine Ganteaume in the ship of the line Républicain, with a squadron of four frigates and two corvettes, the French force was ordered to attack First Coalition shipping in the Aegean Sea. The principal target was the Ottoman city of Smyrna, the most significant trading port of the region, Ganteaume ordered to prey on merchant shipping sailing for European destinations and in particular a large convoy due to sail to Britain.

Ganteaume sailed at the end of September 1795, narrowly avoiding contact with British naval squadrons sailing through the Sea of Sardinia. His squadron missed the Smyrna convoy, which passed westwards in late September and was successfully attacked by a different French squadron at the action of 7 October 1795. After a brief stop at Tunis, Ganteaume reached Smyrna and there lifted a British blockade of a French frigate squadron in the harbour. Cruising during November, Ganteaume caused damage to Russian, British and Neapolitan merchant shipping.

Caught in a gale, one of Ganteaume's frigates was badly damaged and while effecting repairs at the Dardanelles he learned that a British squadron under Thomas Troubridge was searching for him in the Aegean. Sending a corvette to Koroni to distract the British, Ganteaume slipped away, evading British forces to return safely to Toulon in February 1796. Some of his ships were detached to Tunis and were captured there by the British in March. The British naval position in the Mediterranean steadily became untenable over the following year, and by the end of 1796 the entire British fleet had withdrawn to an anchorage in the Tagus.

== Background ==
During 1795 the French Mediterranean fleet, still recovering from the damage inflicted during the Siege of Toulon in 1793, was blockaded in harbour. The British Mediterranean Fleet under Admiral William Hotham, based at San Fiorenzo on Corsica, maintained a loose blockade of the French fleet base at Toulon and pursued the French when they attempted to emerge. In March 1795 the French fleet under Pierre Martin sailed into the Gulf of Genoa and was caught by the British fleet at the Battle of Genoa, losing two ships before Martin could escape British pursuit.

On his return, Martin faced a mutiny and the arrival of reinforcements under Contre-amiral Jean François Renaudin. He sailed again in June, and in July was attacked by Hotham once more, off the Southern coast of France. In the ensuing Battle of the Hyères Islands Martin's rearmost ship was cut off and destroyed by the British fleet. Martin retired to Toulon and there received requests to send reinforcements to the Atlantic Fleet at Brest to replace losses incurred at the Battle of Groix. Martin detached a squadron under Commodore Joseph de Richery to sail westwards into the Atlantic and, on 10 October detached a second squadron, under Commodore Honoré Joseph Antoine Ganteaume, to sail east. Ganteaume's force included the 74-gun ship of the line Républicain, three frigates and two corvettes, and his mission was to intercept a large British merchant convoy known to be sailing westwards from the Levant to Britain and then thought to still be in the Eastern Mediterranean. In fact this convoy had already passed westwards and had been discovered in early October off the Portuguese coast by Richery, who defeated the escort and seized most of the convoy at the action of 7 October 1795.

== Ganteaume's cruise ==
Initially Ganteaume sailed south in search of the convoy and found himself becalmed in the Sea of Sardinia, where he only narrowly avoided an encounter with a large British squadron under Rear-Admiral Robert Mann. Some French accounts record that during this period Ganteaume sighted and attacked HMS Agamemnon under Captain Horatio Nelson, Nelson only just managing to escape pursuit, but Nelson was off the Northern Italian coast at this time and the account is considered a fabrication. Another reported encounter, with a squadron under Sir Hyde Parker, is also thought to be fictional. Admiral Hotham, based at Leghorn, did not learn of Ganteaume's movements for some time, and may have been misled by Ganteaume's passage to the west of Sardinia into believing the Eastern Mediterranean secure.

Eventually Ganteaume passed unscathed though these waters, joining with the frigate Sérieuse off Tunis and turning east. When the squadron arrived in the Aegean Sea in December, Ganteaume ordered it to disperse. The frigate Justice was badly damaged and dismasted in a storm and Ganteaume sent it for repairs in the Dardanelles, while detaching the corvette Badine to patrol the entrance to the Aegean Sea off Greece. He took the main force of his squadron to anchor at Sigri on Lesbos, and from this position he operated against allied shipping in the region for several weeks, with a focus on the Gulf of Smyrna.

The British maintained a few scattered forces in the region, and on 9 December the French frigate Sensible and the smaller corvette Sardine under Commodore Jacques-Mélanie Rondeau, sailing independently of Ganteaume, had entered the neutral Ottoman harbour at Smyrna and found the 28-gun British frigate HMS Nemesis at anchor. Although the British captain Samuel Hood Linzee protested the violation of the harbour's neutrality, the French seized his outnumbered ship without a fight. When Ganteaume appeared, the British frigates HMS Aigle and HMS Cyclops lay at anchor off Smyrna awaiting Rondeau's departure, but Ganteaume drove them off and he added Rondeau's squadron to his own force.

== Return to Toulon ==
During December Ganteaume's force cruised in the Aegean, attacking Russian, British and Neapolitan merchant shipping. British histories record that he "captured a great many" allied merchant vessels in the region, although French sources state only that he took six prizes. As the month progressed, Ganteaume became concerned by the slow rate of repairs to Justice, as well as reports from Constantinople that the new British commander in the region, Admiral Sir John Jervis, who had replaced Hotham in November, had sent a squadron in pursuit. Ganteaume knew, following Rondeau's violation of the neutrality of Smyrna, that he would not be safe in an Ottoman harbour, and laid preparations to leave the Aegean.

The British pursuit force, comprising the ships of the line HMS Culloden and HMS Diadem and frigates HMS Lowestoft, HMS Inconstant and HMS Flora, arrived off Cape Matapan on 27 December and was sighted by Badine, which turned away to the west. The British commander, Captain Thomas Troubridge, ordered his ships in pursuit and Badine was able to draw them as far as Koroni. Troubridge sent Lowestoft to blockade the corvette in the port, but after consideration decided not to violate Ottoman neutrality and left Badine at anchor. Troubridge then took the remainder of his force to Milos on 31 December, and then on to Smyrna.

== Aftermath ==
Learning of Troubridge's arrival, Ganteaume departed his anchorage in the Dardanelles on 2 January 1796, leaving the battered Justice behind. Slipping past the British squadron, he steered for Toulon, arriving, without having encountered another British force, on 5 February. The blockade fleet under Jervis had shifted southward to Minorca and so Toulon was unwatched when Ganteaume arrived. Following repairs, Justice was able to follow a few months later, reaching Toulon without incident in July. Sardine and Nemesis had detached and anchored at Tunis in March, where they were attacked by a British squadron under Vice-Admiral William Waldegrave, who violated Tunisian neutrality in seizing both ships and the corvette Postillion.

The operation had been successful, capturing a number of allied merchant ships and forcing Jervis to disperse his forces across the Mediterranean. During 1796 the increasing isolation of Jervis' fleet, caused by the break-up of the First Coalition under pressure from French military success on land, forced Jervis to consider abandoning the region. By the end of the year, faced with increased threats from the Spanish Navy and without safe harbours west of Gibraltar, he had withdrawn his entire fleet from the Mediterranean, anchoring in the new fleet base at the mouth of the Tagus.

== Order of battle ==
Commodore Ganteaume's squadron
Ship	Rate	Guns	Commander	Notes
Républicain	Third rate	74	Commodore Honoré Ganteaume	
Justice	Frigate	40	Captain Jacques Dalbarade	
Junon	Frigate	40	Captain Amand Leduc	
Artémise	Frigate	32	Captain Pierre-Jean Standelet	
Badine	Corvette	20	Captain Raccord	
Hazard	Brig	16	Lieutenant Bassière	
Sérieuse	Frigate	32		Joined off Tunis in October.
Sensible	Frigate	32	Captain Jacques-Mélanie Rondeau	Attached at Smyrna in December.
Nemesis	Frigate	28		Attached at Smyrna in December. Diverted to Tunis and captured there in March 1796.
Sardine	Brig	16		Attached at Smyrna in December. Diverted to Tunis and captured there in March 1796.
Sources: Troude, vol.2 pp. 438–439.
