= HMS Derwent (1807) =

Brig-sloop of the Royal Navy

- HMS Derwent - Cruizer class

History

United Kingdom
- Name: HMS Derwent
- Ordered: 1 October 1806
- Builder: Isaac Blackburn, Turnchapel
- Laid down: December 1806
- Launched: 23 May 1807
- Commissioned: June 1807
- Out of service: Paid off in 1815
- Fate: Sold 7 March 1817

General characteristics
- Class & type: Cruizer-class brig-sloop
- Tons burthen: 382 (bm)
- Propulsion: Sails
- Sail plan: Brig
- Complement: 121
- Armament: 16 × 32-pounder carronades; 2 × 6-pounder bow guns

HMS Derwent was launched in 1807 and later that year became one of the first ships sent by the British Royal Navy to suppress the slave trade.

== Background ==
On 16 March 1807, the British Parliament passed the Abolition of the Slave Trade Act and the British Prime Minister William Grenville, a long-standing abolitionist, petitioned the Royal Navy help to enforce it. In this, Grenville met with some resistance, not least from the Duke of Clarence and Earl St Vincent. Other than during the Peace of Amiens, Britain had been fighting a global conflict against France since 1793, and ships were in short supply. Chance encounters between Royal Navy ships and slavers of all nations had already led to arrests and the confiscation of ships and cargo but, in 1808, a dedicated anti-slaving squadron was formed. The Admiralty however, was initially only willing to appoint two vessels to the West Africa Squadron; the elderly frigate, HMS Solebay and the recently completed brig-sloop, Derwent.

== Career ==
Commander William Goate commissioned Derwent in June 1807 for the Channel. Commander Frederick Parker replaced Goate in November. Parker sailed for the west coast of Africa on 17 November in company with the fifth-rate frigate HMS Solebay and Tigress, the transport Agincourt, the colonial schooner George, and some merchant vessels, all bound for Sierra Leone. Commodore Edward Columbine, raised his pennant in Solebay. The warships were the first ships in the West Africa Squadron that the British government had established to interdict the Trans Atlantic Slave Trade. After stopping at Madeira for water and supplies, they arrived at Freetown in early 1808. From there, the squadron journeyed north along the coast, exploring and charting the numerous inlets along the way.

On 24 June 1809, the squadron arrived at Gorée. Columbine and Major Charles William Maxwell, the commander of the British garrison there, decided to make an attack on Senegal to prevent French privateers from continuing to use it as a base. By July, a variety of watercraft had been assembled for the mission, comprising several small armed vessels along with Solebay, Derwent, Tigress, the colonial schooner, George and the transport Agincourt. In order to make the force appear more powerful, two unarmed merchantmen were also requisitioned. Maxwell provided 160 soldiers from the Royal African Corps, who boarded Agincourt and, on 4 July, the flotilla set sail. Arriving at the mouth of the Senegal river at night on 7 July, the ships anchored, awaiting daylight before attempting to cross the dangerous sandbar at the entrance. The only navigable portion, which was hard to locate amongst the crashing surf, was a 400 feet (120 m) wide section providing a mere 11 feet (3.4 m) clearance, insufficient for Agincourt. The following morning, the troops, together with 120 sailors and 50 marines were loaded into boats. George passed through first, in order to take soundings, followed by the boats, under the escort of Solebay, Derwent and Tigress. One of the boats capsized during the attempt, resulting in the death of two officers, one of whom was Parker, and six seamen. George ran aground shortly after entering the river and a portion of troops were landed in order to protect the stricken schooner. The French however were busy retreating 12 miles upstream to the fortified trading post of Babague. It took two days to free the George.

On 11 July, the expedition moved off with Solebay's first lieutenant, Joseph Swabey Tetley, now in command of Derwent, following the death of Parker. At Babague, the garrison, comprising 160 regular soldiers and 240 militia, had stretched a boom across the river. Seven gunboats patrolled behind this, while on shore, there was a battery of 24-pounder (11 kg) long guns, of which there were 28 in number, together with four mortars, four howitzers and 16 smaller guns. Columbine and a portion of the crew assisted in land operations, while the remainder, under the master, Daniel Lye, took the Solebay close to the enemy position and, supported by the Derwent, began a bombardment. At 20:00, concerned that the French might launch a cutting out expedition from the shore, Lye ordered the ship to be moved further out but the strong currents took her downriver, where she became entangled with the Derwent. Crews managed to free her off but Solebay was swept onto the shore and could not be got off. When dawn broke, Solebay came under fire from shore batteries which by mid-afternoon, had shot away the rigging, damaged the masts and yards extensively, and holed the hull fourteen times. Later that day, news was received that the French intended to surrender. When Maxwell entered Babague, he found it abandoned and the boom broken. The capitulation was signed on 13 July and St Louis and its dependencies were relinquished to Britain. The French prisoners of war were repatriated to France under parole. It took several days to remove the stores from Solebay and on 17 July, the ship was finally abandoned.

22 Aug 1809 Derwent arrived at Spithead on 22 August, carrying Solebay's captain and crew. Four days later Derwent came into Portsmouth.

On 31 August Tetley received promotion to the rank of Commander and was confirmed in command of Derwent. Between January and October 1810 Derwent underwent fitting at Portsmouth. Commander George Sutton assumed command in May 1810.

On 30 July 1811 Derwent captured the French privateer Rafleur. Rafleur, of Granville, carried 20 men armed with small arms. (Note: She had been commissioned at Granville circa June 1811 with 85 men and 2 guns.)

Freundshaft, Bull. master, arrived at Ramsgate on 18 November, having lost her fore mast. She had been detained by Derwent.

On 7 February 1813 Derwent captured the French privateer Edouard off The Lizard. She was pierced for 16 guns but only had eight mounted. She had a complement of 49 men and had left Saint-Malo the evening before and had not made any captures. (Note: Edouard was a 50-ton ("of load") privateer from Saint-Malo commissioned in November 1811 (22.09 metre long, 19.81 at the keel, 4.22m beam and 1.95 m draft). She was under the command of Jean Longrais with 37 men and six 1–pounder guns from November 1811 to April 1812. She was under Jean-François Dilarbourg (or Dibarboure?) with 22 men and six 1–pounder guns from August 1812 to February 1813.)

On 9 February Quebec, Adams, master, arrived at Portsmouth. (Note: Quebec, of 222 tons (bm), had been built at Quebec in 1799. She was armed with thirteen 12-pounder guns and one 6-pounder.) She had been sailing from London to Gibraltar when the American privateer Paul Jones had captured her near Lisbon on 20 January after a three-hour fight. (Note: Paul Jones, of New York, A.S. Taylor, master, was a schooner of 120 tons and 16 guns.) HMS Leonidas captured her on 23 May off the coast of Ireland after a chase. During the chase Paul Jones had five men wounded out of a crew of 85 at the time. Derwent had recaptured Quebec and sent her back to England.

Horatio, Walker, master, arrived at Portsmouth some days before 24 October. (Note: Horatio, of two guns and 137 tons (bm), had been launched in Cornwall in 1810.) She had been sailing from Teneriffe to London when a French privateer lugger of 14 guns and 95 men had captured her off the Wight. Derwent had recaptured her off Barfleur and sent her back to England.

On 24 December Lloyd's List reported that Derwent had recaptured Racehorse, which the French privateer Diligent, of 14 guns and 120 men, had captured. Racehorse had been sailing from Newfoundland to Teignmouth when captured. (Note: Racehorse, of 123 tons (bm), had been launched at Teignmouth in 1802.)

Derwent arrived at Plymouth on 20 December. She had left there on 25 November with a convoy for St Andero. On the 30th a transport, letter "N", lost her bowsprit and foremast and Derwent towed her for two days. However a storm came up and Derwent had to drop the tow and there were fears for the transport's safety. Derwent herself lost her bowsprit in the storm and had to throw some guns overboard, but arrived safely at St Andero with three transports.

In June 1814 Commander Thomas Williams replaced Sutton. Derwent was paid off in 1815.

== Fate ==
The "Principal Officers and Commissioners of His Majesty's Navy" offered the "Derwent sloop, of 382 tons", "Lying at Chatham", for sale on 7 March 1817. Derwent was sold to Mr. Young at Chatham on 7 March 1817 for £850.
