= Battle of the Hyères Islands =

1795 battle of the War of the First Coalition

Coordinates: 43°17′N 06°48′E

- Part of the Mediterranean campaign of 1793–1796
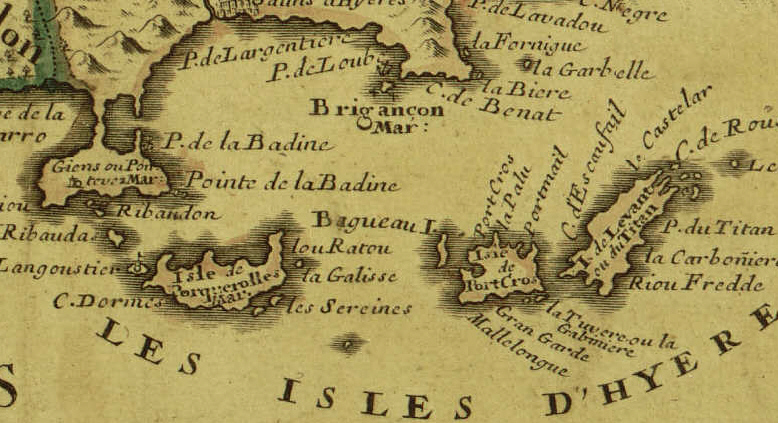
- 1707 map of the Îles d'Hyères
| Date | 13 July 1795 |
| Location | Off Îles d'Hyères, Mediterranean Sea |
| Result | Anglo-Neapolitan victory |

Belligerents
| Great Britain; Naples | France |

Commanders and leaders
| William Hotham; Horatio Nelson | Pierre Martin |

Strength
| 23 ships of the line 2 frigates 1 corvette 3 brigs 1 cutter (OOB) | 19 ships of the line 7 frigates 1 corvette 4 brigs (OOB) |

Casualties and losses
| 11 killed 28 wounded | c. 300 killed or wounded 1 ship of the line destroyed |

The Battle of the Hyères Islands was a fleet action fought between a combined British and Neapolitan fleet and the French Mediterranean Fleet on 13 July 1795 during the French Revolutionary Wars. Since the start of the war in 1793 the French fleet had suffered a series of damaging defeats and was restricted to limited operations off the French Mediterranean Coast in the face of a determined allied blockade. The French fleet, commanded by Pierre Martin, had sought to test the blockade during 1795, and in March had been caught by the British, under William Hotham, in the Gulf of Genoa. At the ensuing Battle of Genoa two French ships were captured before Martin was able to retreat to a safe anchorage.

During the spring Martin and Hotham both received reinforcements from their respective Atlantic Fleets, the British admiral sailing off Minorca while Martin was forced to put down a mutiny among his sailors. By June Hotham had returned to the Ligurian Sea, anchored in San Fiorenzo Bay, when the French fleet sailed once more. In early July Martin's fleet was discovered off Cap Corse by a British flying squadron under Captain Horatio Nelson and, with some delay, Hotham set off in pursuit. Martin retreated towards the safe anchorage of the Îles d'Hyères, but on 13 July his straggling ships were caught by the British vanguard. In a short battle the British cut off the rearmost ship Alcide and forced it to surrender.

Alcide had caught fire during the action and blew up shortly afterwards with heavy loss of life. Hotham was in a position to attack the surviving French fleet but declined, to the frustration of his officers and the criticism of later historians. The British retained their blockade, and Martin did not contest it again for the remainder of the year. This was the last fleet action in the Mediterranean before the British fleet was forced to withdraw in late 1796 – the next major engagement in the region was the Battle of the Nile in 1798.

== Background ==
During the French Revolutionary Wars, the Royal Navy's Mediterranean Fleet seized the French Navy's Mediterranean Squadron at the start of the siege of Toulon in August 1793. Shortly before the French Revolutionary Army recaptured the city in December, Anglo-Spanish boarding parties attempted to burn the French fleet, but due to failures by Spanish forces only half of the French ships were destroyed. In 1794, as the French repaired their ships, the British invaded and captured the island of Corsica, subsequently using San Fiorenzo Bay as an anchorage from which they could blockade Toulon.

Although the French fleet, under the command of Counter-admiral Pierre Martin, made a brief sally from port in June 1794, it was not until March 1795 that it had the strength necessary for a large scale cruise. Sailing from Toulon on 3 March, the fleet encountered and captured the British ship HMS Berwick off Cap Corse, but was then pursued by a joint British-Neapolitan fleet in the Gulf of Genoa. Retreating towards Toulon, the French were unable to evade the British fleet, under Vice-Admiral William Hotham, and on 13 March at the Battle of Genoa the rearmost ship was cut off and badly damaged. The following day this ship, the Ça Ira, and its companion Censeur, were forced to surrender as Martin and the remainder of his ships escaped to the west.

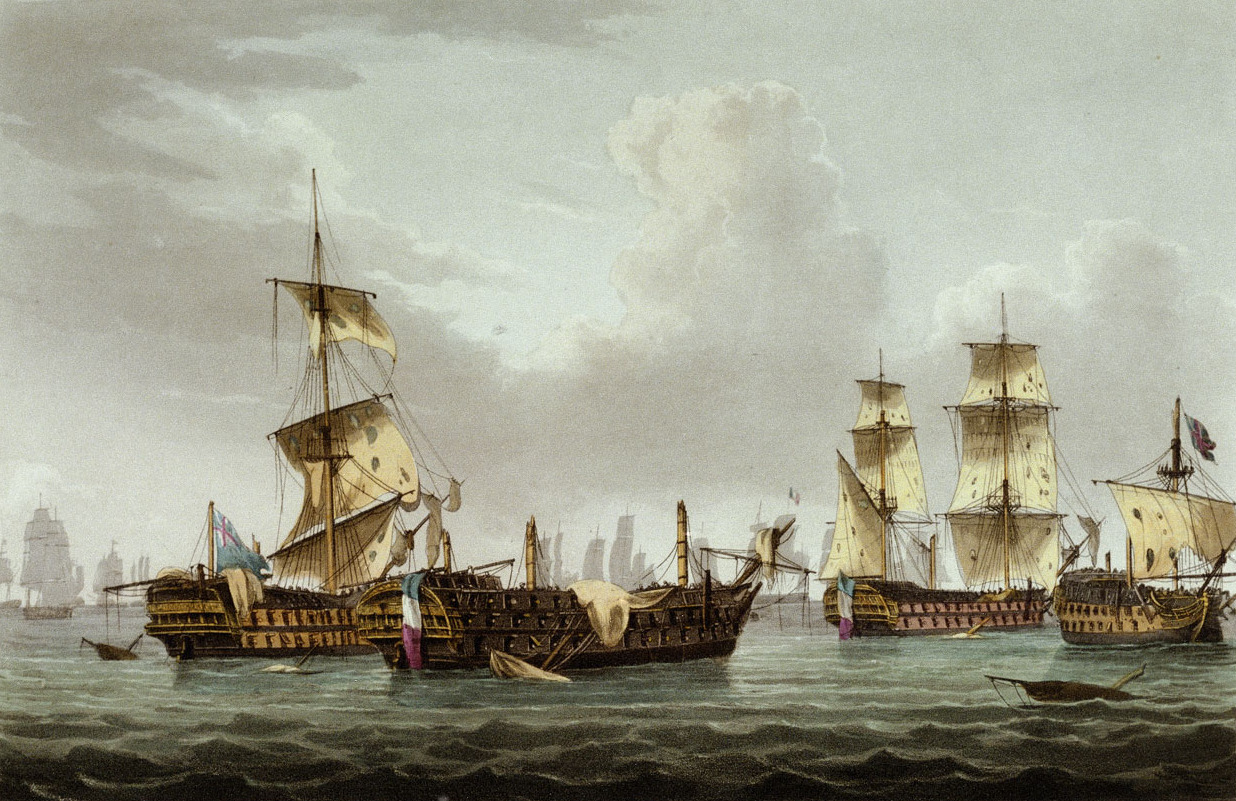
The Battle of Genoa, which preceded the Battle of the Hyères Islands

Hotham sailed to an anchorage off La Spezia, where one ship was wrecked, before returning to San Fiorenzo for refit. In April he took the fleet to Leghorn, where he learned of his promotion to Admiral of the Blue, and he then sailed on an extended cruise to Cape Mola off Mahón on Minorca. There he met on 14 June with a large reinforcement sent from Britain, comprising nine ships of the line under Rear-Admiral Robert Mann. Hotham was concerned that in his absence the French fleet might have sailed once more, and sent a small frigate squadron under Captain George Henry Towry back into the Ligurian Sea to search for Martin. This squadron instead encountered a squadron of French frigates on the same mission and in the ensuing Action of 24 June 1795 the French frigate Minerve was captured.

The French had been unable to sail for most of the spring; Martin was initially preoccupied with gathering his ships and conducting repairs in his anchorage at the Îles d'Hyères off the French coast. He sent his most damaged ships back to Toulon, and they were joined there on 4 April by a reinforcement of six ships of the line under Counter-admiral Jean François Renaudin, sent from Brest on 22 February. Martin joined this force soon afterwards, but in May his fleet was struck by a significant mutiny. The sailors of Martin's fleet, although not of Renaudin's recently arrived squadron, refused further service, and it was only the efforts of Représentant en mission Joseph Niou which persuaded the rebellious seamen to return to duty, Niou making them promise "to wash their crime in the blood of the enemies of the [French] republic."

== Pursuit ==
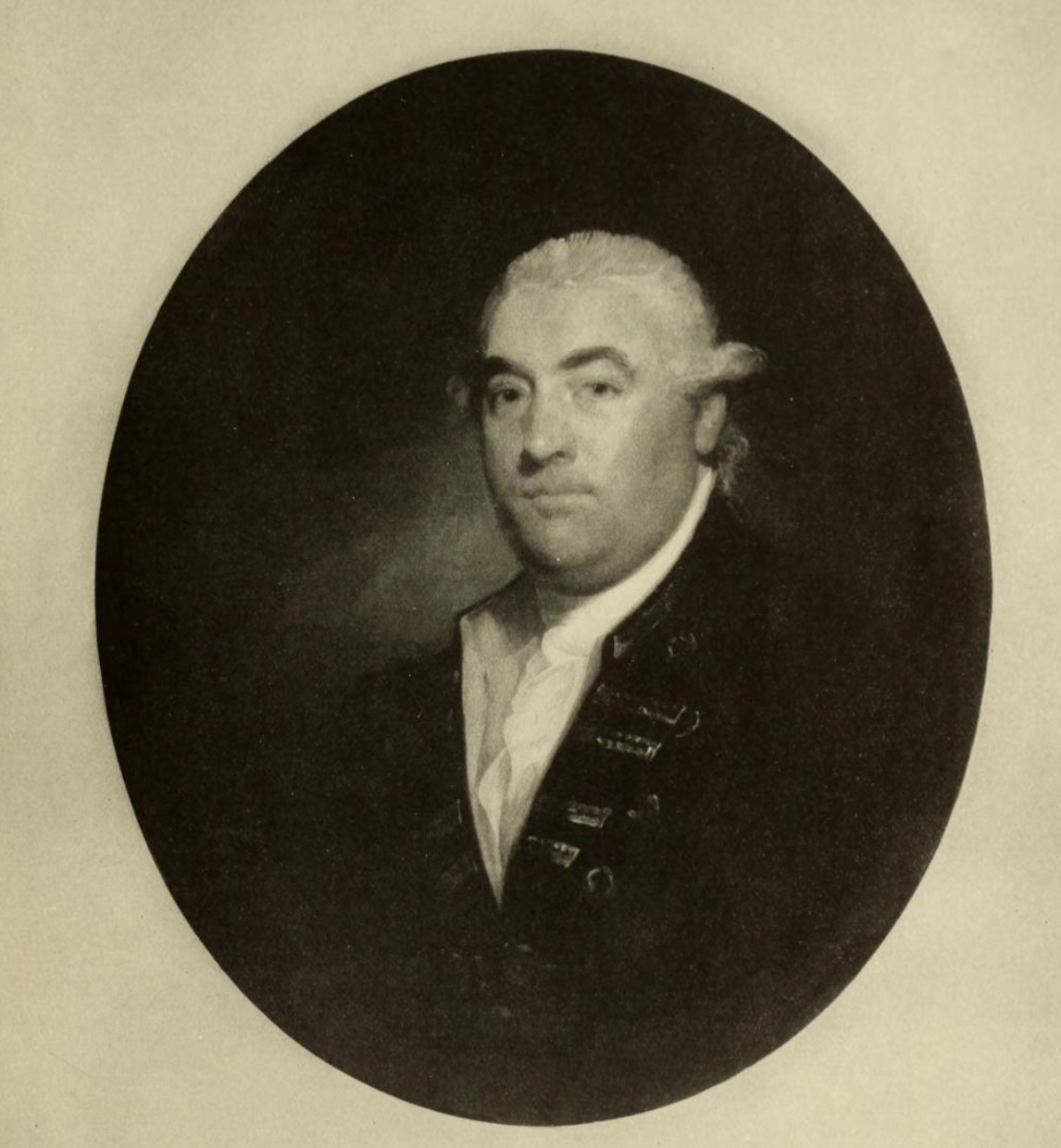
William Hotham, the British commander at the battle

At Niou's urging Martin took his fleet to sea once more on 7 June, his force comprising 17 ships of the line and six frigates. Hotham remained off Minorca until 24 June, before sailing up the eastern coast of Corsica and Sardinia, arriving at San Fiorenzo on 29 June. En route messages sent by Towry on the cutter Fox reached Hotham, warning that prisoners taken from Minerve reported that Martin was at sea. Hotham decided that the French were on a sailing exercise rather than an offensive operation and decided not to intervene, ordering his ships to refit and resupply. He did not post guard frigates or send scouts in search of Martin's force. On 4 July Hotham detached a small squadron led by Captain Horatio Nelson in HMS Agamemnon, with the frigate HMS Meleager and the smaller ships HMS Ariadne, HMS Moselle and HMS Mutine. Nelson's orders were to liaise with the Austrian general Joseph Nikolaus de Vins for operations against the French Army of Italy in Northwestern Italy, as well as patrol off Genoa and then to pass along the French coast to the west.

At 16:00 on 7 July off Cape del Melle, Nelson's force discovered the French fleet. Martin had visited Genoa, where Ferdinand III, Grand Duke of Tuscany had recently signed peace terms with France, and then sent Mercure and Guerrier back to Toulon. On sighting Nelson, Martin recognised the small size of the British force and led his fleet in pursuit, Nelson retreating towards San Fiorenzo with Moselle trailing behind the rest of the squadron. At 07:20 the following morning, Agamemnon began firing signal guns in the hope of alerting Hotham to the presence of the French, and at 09:30 the leading French ships saw the British fleet at anchor. Although the British were unprepared and vulnerable to attack, Martin immediately ordered his fleet to turn away to the west, towards Toulon. The winds were blowing from the west and both Martin and Hotham were hampered. The British fleet was in a state of unreadiness, and it was not until 21:00 that Hotham was able to lead 23 ships of the line, including Agamemnon and two allied Neapolitan ships, out of the bay in pursuit of the French, who had used the delay to escape to the north.

For four days Hotham searched for the French against the wind coming from the southwest. Late on 12 July, approximately 24 nautical miles (44 km) east of Île du Levant, the small frigate HMS Cyclops learned from passing vessels that the French had recently passed by to the south. Hotham gave the signal to "prepare for battle" and led his fleet to the southwest in the expectation of meeting the French. During the night a gale from the northwest caused damage to the sails of a number of ships, but at dawn on 13 July the French were seen just 5 nautical miles (9.3 km) to leeward, scattered widely.

At 03:45 Hotham gave orders to form his ships up and sailed to larboard in an effort to cut the French off from land. Martin used the time to organise his fleet and by 08:00 the French were sailing in line of battle back towards the Îles d'Hyères.

== Battle ==
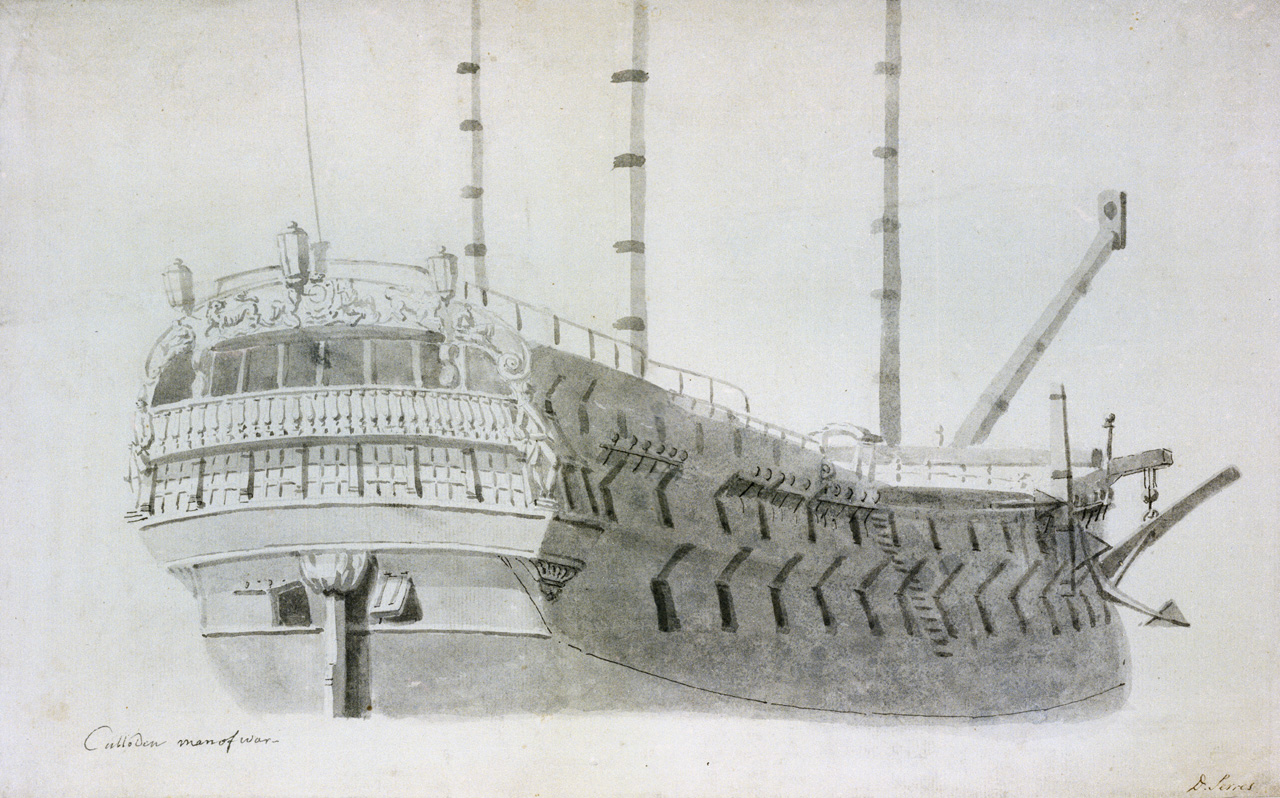
HMS Culloden, one of the leading British ships at the battle

Recognising that the French might now escape, Hotham gave orders for a general chase, allowing his fastest ships the opportunity to come up with the French to the best of their ability. By noon the French were 0.75 nautical miles (1.39 km) ahead of the British to the northeast, with Hotham's fleet scattered across 8 nautical miles (15 km) of sea. At 12:30 a wind shift from southwest to the north brought the French about so that the broadsides of the last three French ships could bear on the approaching British. The leading British ships, HMS Culloden, HMS Cumberland and HMS Victory all came under fire.

The shift in wind favoured the British, allowing them to gain rapidly on the French. The British ships were soon able to return fire, targeting the slowest French ship, Alcide. Although Culloden was forced back after losing a topmast, Alcide was soon badly damaged and isolated. At 14:00, in danger of being overwhelmed, Alcide's captain Laurent Le Blond de Saint-Hilaire struck his colours and surrendered his ship to Cumberland. Captain Bartholomew Rowley did not acknowledge the surrender, passing on to attack the next French ship in line, and the French frigates Alceste and Justice attempted to pass a tow rope to Alcide and drag it away from the British fleet. The ship's boat carrying the rope was sunk by fire from Victory, and the frigates sheered off under heavy fire. An attempt by Aquilon to reach Alcide was abandoned when it became clear that the surrendered ship was on fire.

By 14:42 more British ships, including Agamemnon, HMS Blenheim, HMS Captain and HMS Defence were now within long range and trading fire with the rearmost French ships Généreux, Berwick, Tyrannicide and Aquilon, with which Cumberland was now heavily engaged. Hotham then suddenly issued flag signals instructing his captains to discontinue the action and return to the flagship HMS Britannia. Hotham was at this point 8 nautical miles (15 km) from the action and unable to see that his ships were poised to attack the main French fleet, concerned that his dispersed ships were vulnerable to the fire from the French fleet and shore batteries. Admiral Mann on Victory had to repeat the order twice before Rowley acknowledged and retired from combat. At this point the battling ships were approximately 12 nautical miles (22 km) southeast of Cape Roux, towards which the French, having gained the weather gage by a shift in wind to the east, were now sailing.

Fire had taken hold on the surrendered Alcide in the foretop, probably due to the detonation of a grenade. By 14:15 it had spread out of control, sweeping the ship from end to end. The crew threw themselves into the sea to escape the flames and approximately 300 were collected by boats from the passing British ships, but at least 300 are believed to have been killed when the ship's magazines detonated at 15:45. Saint-Hilaire was among the dead.

== Aftermath ==
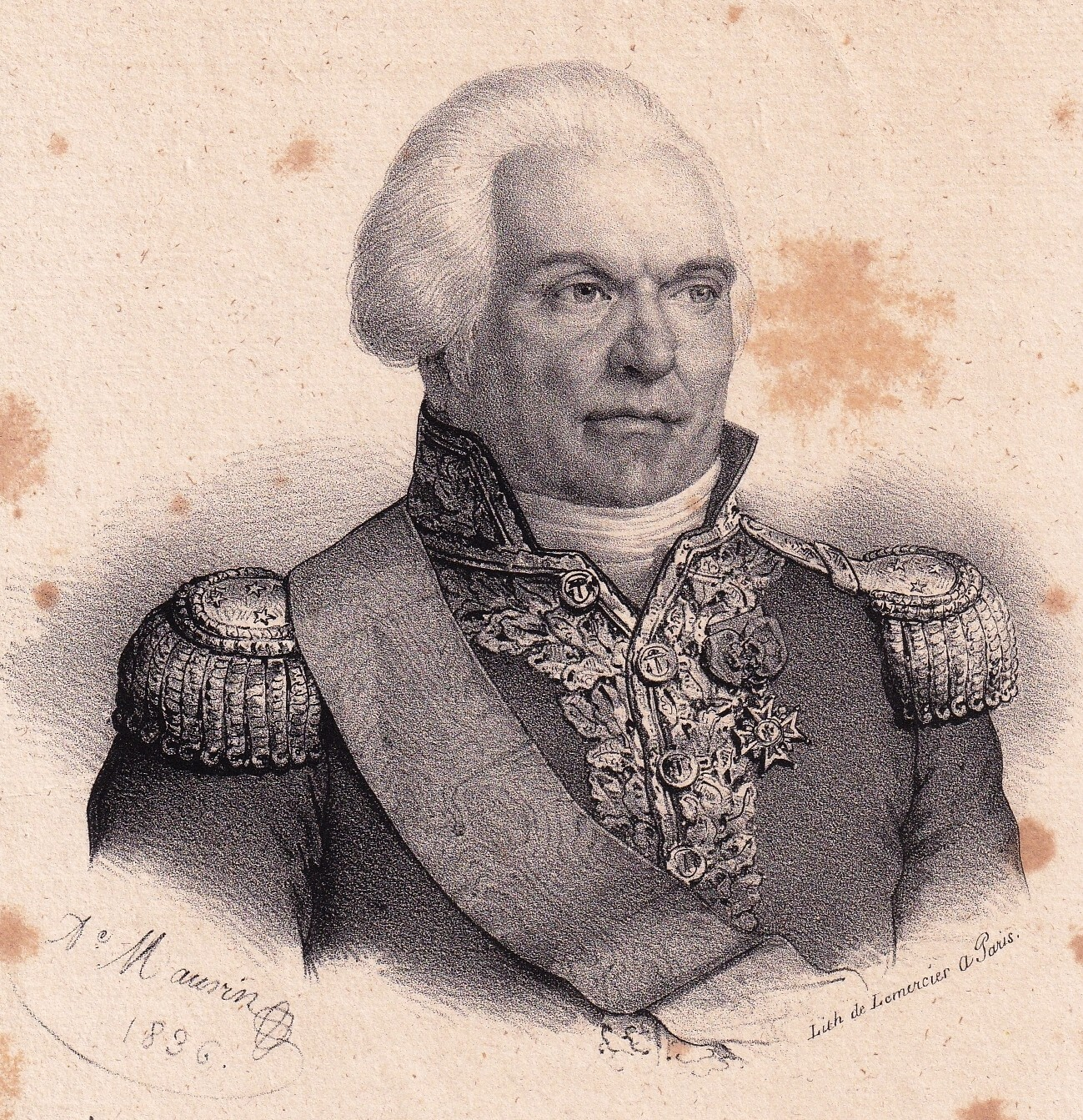
1836 portrait of Martin

Aside from the heavy loss of life on Alcide, French losses are not reported, although few other French ships were heavily engaged. British losses were mild, with 11 killed and 28 wounded across five ships. Cumberland, the most heavily engaged of the British fleet, suffered no casualties at all. Victory, Cumberland and Culloden had all been damaged in the sails and rigging, but none seriously. Martin led his surviving ships into the bay off Fréjus, anchoring there by 19:00. The French fleet was later able to return to Toulon along the coast without interference from Hotham, and remained in harbour until 14 September when orders from the National Convention arrived instructing Martin to send six ships of the line and three frigates back to the Atlantic fleet at Brest to replace losses incurred at the Battle of Groix in June. This force was commanded by Counter-admiral Joseph de Richery and on 7 October it encountered and attacked an escorted British convoy off Cape St. Vincent, capturing a ship of the line and 30 merchant ships.

Hotham returned to San Fiorenzo and then to Leghorn. In August he briefly cruised off Toulon before retiring once more, although Nelson was detached with a squadron to operate against French Army movements on the Mediterranean Coast, attacking coastal positions near Alassio. In September Hotham sent a detachment in pursuit of Richery, but this force was far too late to prevent the destruction of the convoy in October. Later in the year another French squadron was sent on a mission to Smyrna, escaped Toulon under Captain Honoré Ganteaume, and caused severe damage to British merchant shipping in the Eastern Mediterranean. Hotham retired from his post at Leghorn on 1 November, passing command of the Mediterranean Fleet to Admiral Sir John Jervis. Martin did not lead a fleet to sea again during the Mediterranean campaign, but in late 1796 French victories on land in Italy eliminated British allies from the war, making the maintenance of a fleet off Toulon impractical. The Mediterranean Fleet was forced to withdraw to the Tagus, ceding the Mediterranean theatre to France.

Hotham was heavily criticised at the time for his conduct during the battle, a series of delays and hesitations allowing the French to escape when they might easily have been destroyed. His second-in-command Samuel Goodall was said to have kicked his hat across the deck in fury at Hotham's order to withdraw. Nelson wrote of the decision to withdraw that "In the forenoon we had every prospect of taking every Ship in the Fleet; and at noon it was almost certain we should have the six near ships." He was critical of Martin too, writing "The French Admiral, I am sure, is not a wise man, nor an Officer: he was undetermined whether to fight or run away." Later historians have been scathing of Hotham's failure to bring Martin to action earlier and more vigorously; C. S. Forester wrote in reference to the sea battles of 1795 that "Once more a French fleet had got away through a lack of energy and diligence on the part of a British Admiral." Historian Noel Mostert describes Hotham's indecision as "a disastrous failure" and links the missed opportunity to inflict a major defeat on the French directly to the British withdrawal from the Mediterranean the following year. No major British naval force returned to the Mediterranean until the Mediterranean campaign of 1798.

== Bibliography ==
- Bennett, Geoffrey (2002) [1972]. Nelson the Commander. London: Penguin. ISBN 0-141391-29-4.
- Bradford, Ernle (1999) [1977]. Nelson: The Essential Hero. Ware: Wordsworth Military Library. ISBN 1-84022-202-6.
- Clowes, William Laird (1997) [1900]. The Royal Navy, A History from the Earliest Times to 1900, Volume IV. London: Chatham Publishing. ISBN 1-86176-013-2.
- Forester, C. S. (2001) [1929]. Nelson. London: Chatham Publishing. ISBN 1-86176-178-3.
- Gardiner, Robert, ed. (2001) [1996]. Fleet Battle and Blockade. London: Caxton Editions. ISBN 1-84067-363-X.
- Ireland, Bernard (2005). The Fall of Toulon: The Last Opportunity the Defeat the French Revolution. Cassell. ISBN 0-3043-6726-5.
- James, William (2002) [1827]. The Naval History of Great Britain, Volume 1, 1793–1796. London: Conway Maritime Press. ISBN 0-85177-905-0.
- Mostert, Noel (2007). The Line upon a Wind: The Greatest War Fought at Sea Under Sail 1793–1815. Vintage Books. ISBN 9-78071-260-9272.
- Rodger, N.A.M. (2004). The Command of the Ocean. Allan Lane. ISBN 0-71399-411-8.
- Troude, Onésime-Joachim (1867). Batailles navales de la France (in French). Vol. 2. Challamel ainé. pp. 424–431.
