= French ship Corcyre =

Three ships of the French Navy have borne the name Corcyre, the French name for Corfu:

- Corcyre (1797), previously the British privateer Cornish Hero
- Corcyre (1798), was a djerme or cange, a narrow boat with sails that operated on the Nile. The French used her during the French campaign in Egypt and Syria.
- Corcyre (1809), previously the Russian frigate Liogkii
