= Agincourt (1804 ship) =

History

United Kingdom
- Name: Agincourt
- Namesake: Battle of Agincourt
- Builder: Francis Hurry, North Shields
- Launched: 8 September 1804
- Fate: Abandoned November 1821

General characteristics
- Tons burthen: 346, or 34622/94, or 347, or 354 (bm))
- Armament: 1805:4 × 6-pounder guns; 1806:4 × 6-pounder + 4 × 4-pounder guns; 1815:2 × 6-pounder guns + 6 × 18-pounder carronades

Agincourt was a merchant vessel launched at North Shields in 1804. She was a transport and later sailed between Britain and Quebec. Her crew abandoned her at sea in 1821.

== Career ==
Although she was launched in 1804, Agincourt first appeared in a register, the Register of Shipping, in 1805. Her master was Crawford, her owner F. Hurry, and her trade Shields–London.

On 14 February 1806 Lloyd's List reported that Agincourt, Sandwell, master, had run ashore in the Shannon while sailing from Tortola to London. A few days later it was reported that she had been gotten off.

On 19 January 1808 Lloyd's List reported that the transports Agnes and Agincourt, from the River Plate, had been driven ashore at Cowes, on 14 January 1808.

Agincourt may have been the transport that accompanied HMS Solebay, Derwent, and Tigress in the expedition that resulted in the capitulation on 13 July 1809 of Saint-Louis, Senegal, and its dependencies.

Year	Master	Owner	Trade	Source and notes
1806	W. Sandwell	Morley	London transport	Register of Shipping (RS)
1810	W. Sandwell	Morley	London transport	(RS)
1815	Johnson	J. Manby	Cork transport	Lloyd's Register
1818	T. Mather	Rainston	Shields–London; London–Quebec	RS; Damages repaired in 1816
1820	J. Mathwin; R.Railstone	J.Railstone	Lieth–Quebec	LR

On 4 October 1819 Agincourt, Mathwin, master, put into Milford Haven. She had been sailing from Quebec to London when she developed a leak that resulted in her talking on 18 inches of water an hour. She was going to discharge her cargo so that she could be grounded and examined to determine the damage she had sustained.

== Loss ==
Agincourt, Everard, master, sailed from Quebec City to London on 7 October 1821. She was found abandoned and waterlogged on 12 November.

Her crew had abandoned Agincourt in the Atlantic Ocean at (49°17′N 17°00′W) after she developed a leak and 14 feet of water had accumulated in her hold. St Vincent rescued Agincourt's 13 crew members from their boats on 8 November. St Vincent was on her way from Glasgow to Grenada and transferred the seamen to several vessels sailing eastwards. Juno, Casengina, master, sailing from Montevideo, delivered Captain Everard and three of his crew to Gibraltar on 10 December.
