= Robert Bones =

Commander Robert Bones (died 1813) was a Royal Navy officer who, as a lieutenant, was acting Governor of Sierra Leone for two months in 1811. Bones had previously been commander of HMS Tigress.

Bones was given command of Tigress in October 1808 and sailed her from Portsmouth to Spithead where he joined Edward H. Columbine who was in command of HMS Solebay. They were involved in naval action, attacking the French slave station at Gorée on 24 June 1809.

Preceded by Edward H. Columbine	Governor of Sierra Leone; May–June 1811	Succeeded by Charles William Maxwell
