= Saint-Florent Cathedral =

Coordinates: 42°40′47″N 9°18′40″E

Saint-Florent Cathedral Cathédrale Santa-Maria-Assunta
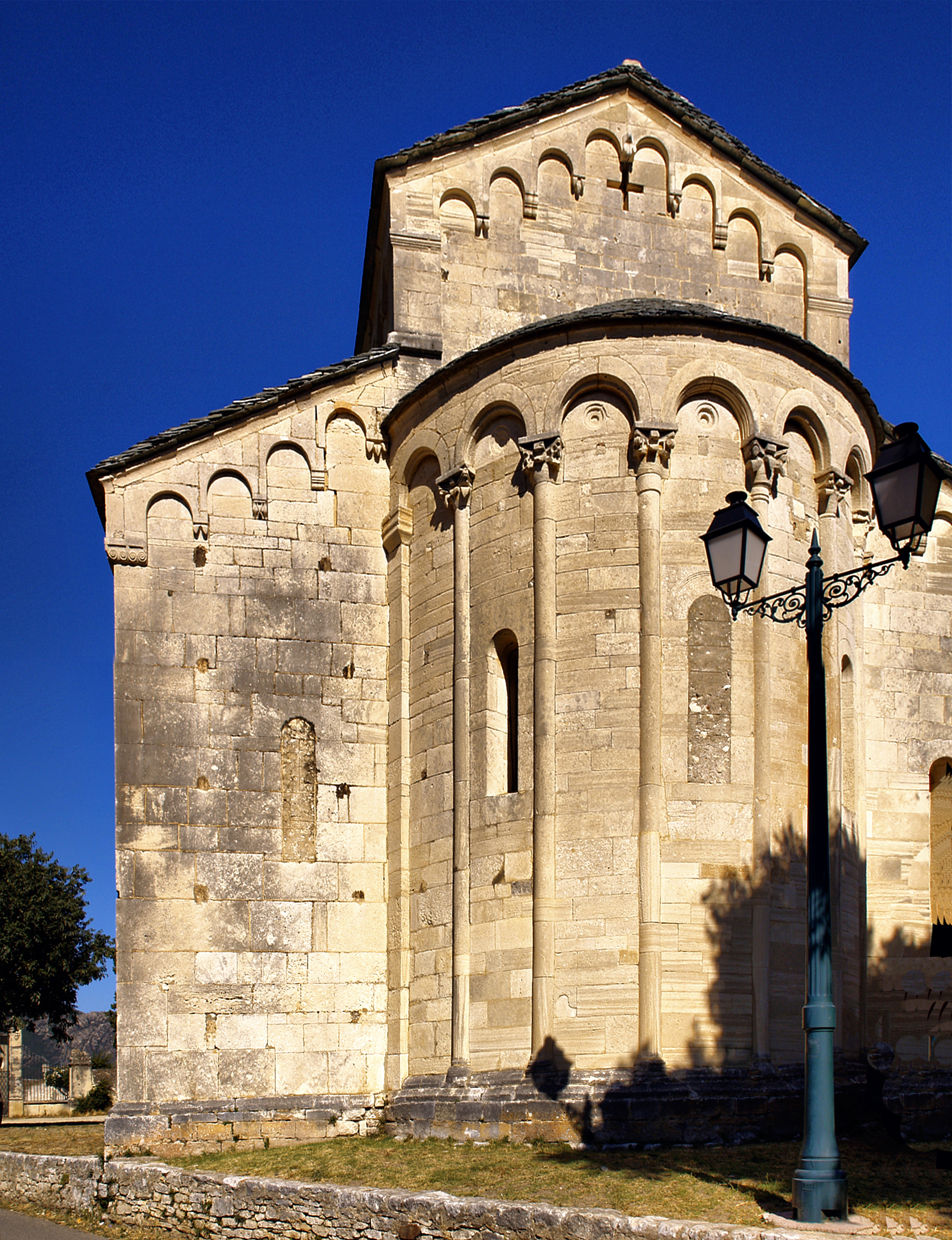
- Saint-Florent Cathedral apse

Religion
- Affiliation: Roman Catholic Church
- Province: Bishop of Nebbio
- Region: Haute-Corse
- Rite: Roman Rite
- Ecclesiastical or organisational status: Cathedral
- Status: Active

Location
- Location: Saint-Florent, France
- Interactive map of Saint-Florent Cathedral; Cathédrale Santa-Maria-Assunta

Architecture
- Type: church
- Groundbreaking: 12th century
- Completed: 18th century

Saint-Florent Cathedral or Nebbio Cathedral (Cathédrale Santa-Maria-Assunta, also known as Cathédrale du Nebbio) is a former Roman Catholic church located in the town of Saint-Florent in Corsica, France. The cathedral is a national monument and is now the church of Santa Maria Assunta.

The cathedral was the seat of the Bishop of Nebbio until 1801, when the diocese was merged into the Diocese of Ajaccio.

== History ==
The ancient region of the Nebbio, or Nebbiu, on Corsica formed a Christian bishopric from the 5th century onwards. The former cathedral, now the church of Santa Maria Assunta, located at the edge of the town of Saint-Florent on the road that leads to Poggio d'Oletta, is a heavily-restored Romanesque structure. The date of its construction is put at between about 1125 and 1140. The building has had protected status since 1840 as a national monument.

The first clear documentary reference to this cathedral is in a deed dated 1176 transcribed in the cartulary of Calci Charterhouse, although it may well be referred to in two earlier documents of 1138 and 1145.

Because of the insecurity of the coasts and the malaria which was endemic in the marshes that surrounded the foot of the hill on which the cathedral stands, it was abandoned by the bishops. At the beginning of the 16th century the humanist Agostino Giustiniani, bishop of Nebbio, had the cathedral repaired. It was also at this time that the belltower was almost certainly added which was destroyed by the 19th-century restorers. Despite these works, the cathedral was abandoned again in 1576. It was described as being roofless during a visitation by Mgr Sauli, the then Bishop of Aleria.

In 1611 Mgr Ruscone had a new episcopal palace built next to the cathedral, later destroyed, and later still re-constructed in 1714 by Mgr Aprosio. Both cathedral and palace were occupied in 1748 by Genoese troops. The last bishop of Nebbio was Mgr Santini, from 1776 to 1801, when the bishopric of Nebbio was incorporated into that of Ajaccio, and the cathedral lost its status.

== Gallery ==
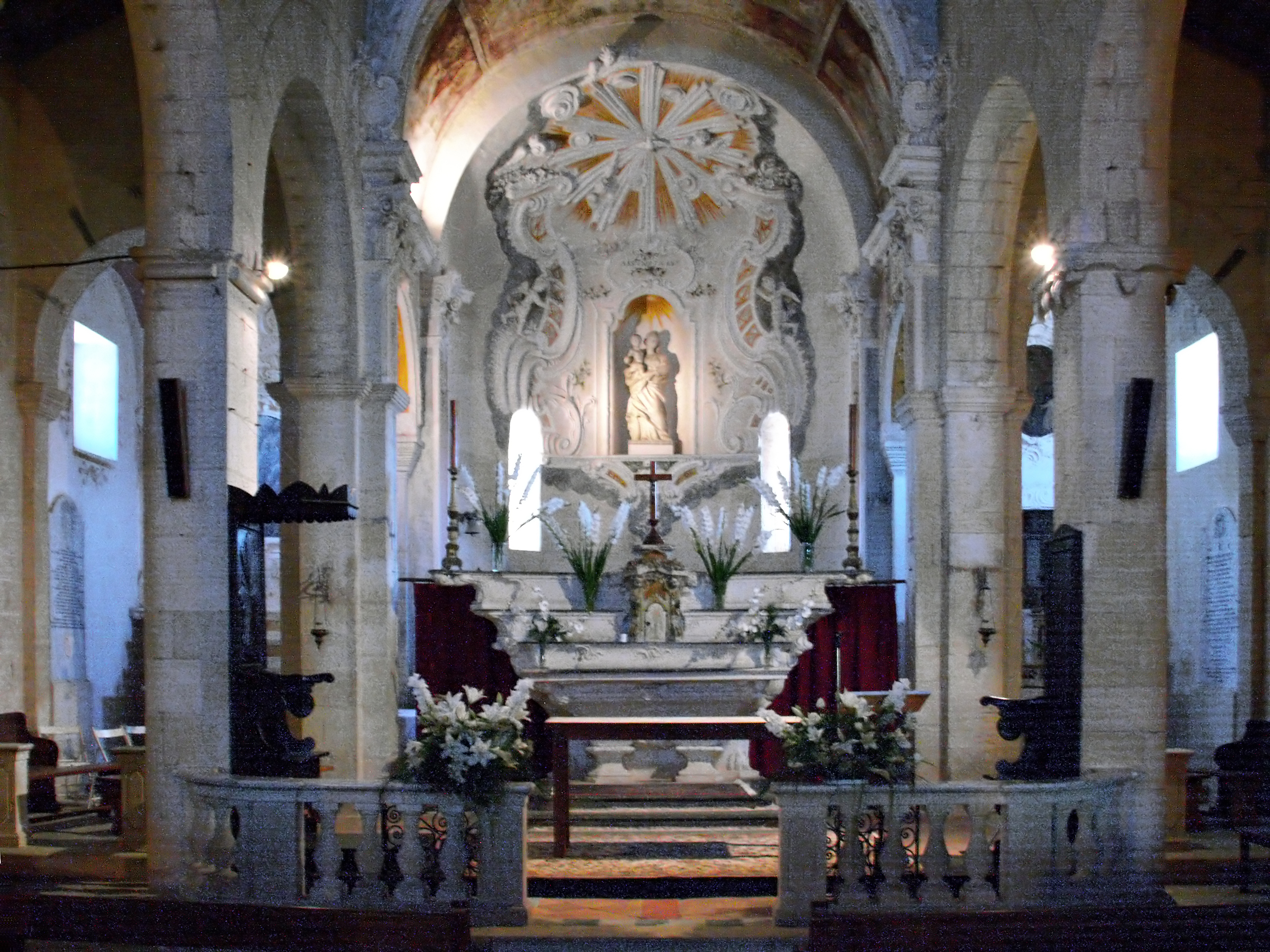
Choir and main altar

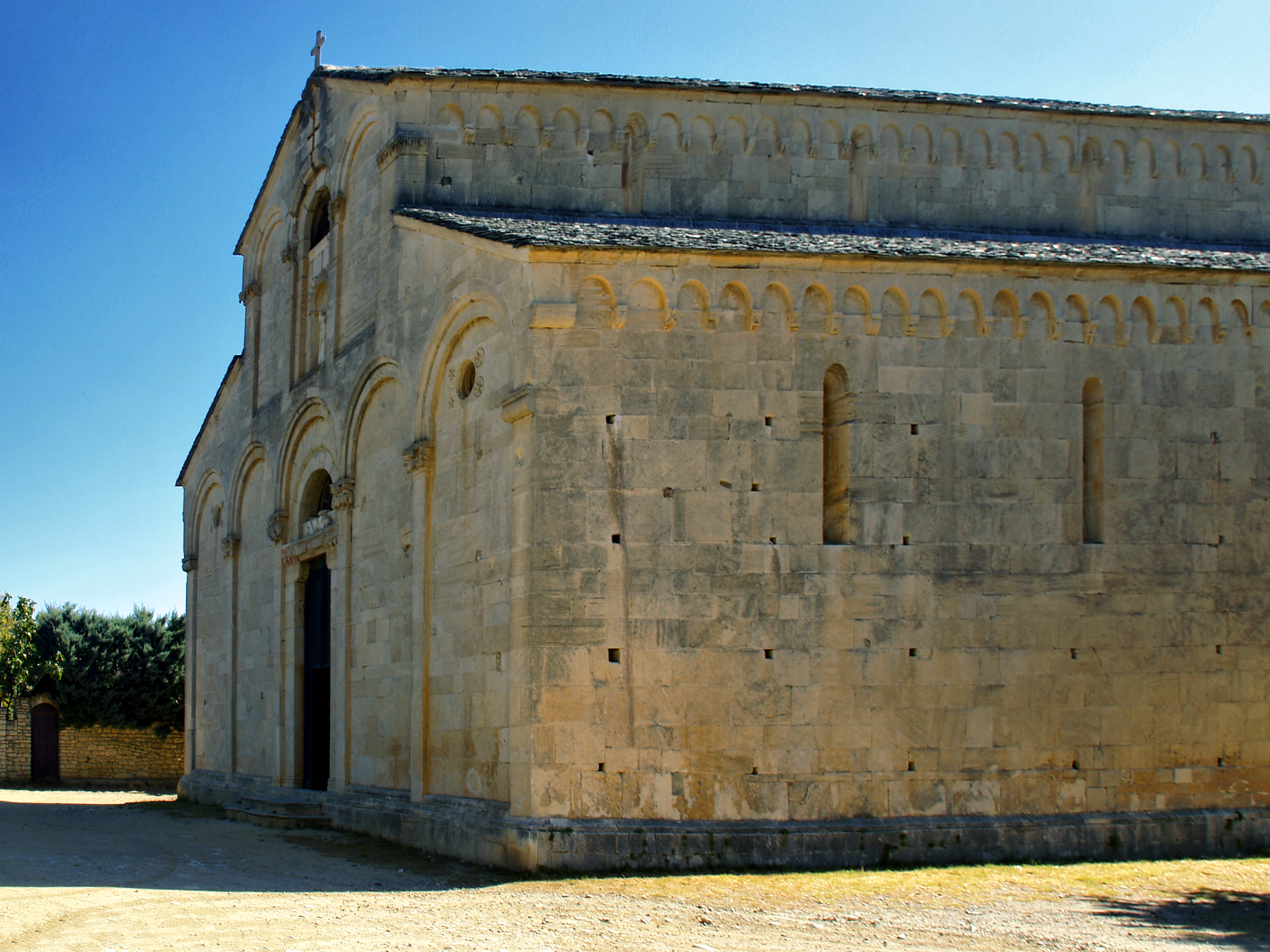
West end
