= Lento, Haute-Corse =

Lento Lentu
- Commune
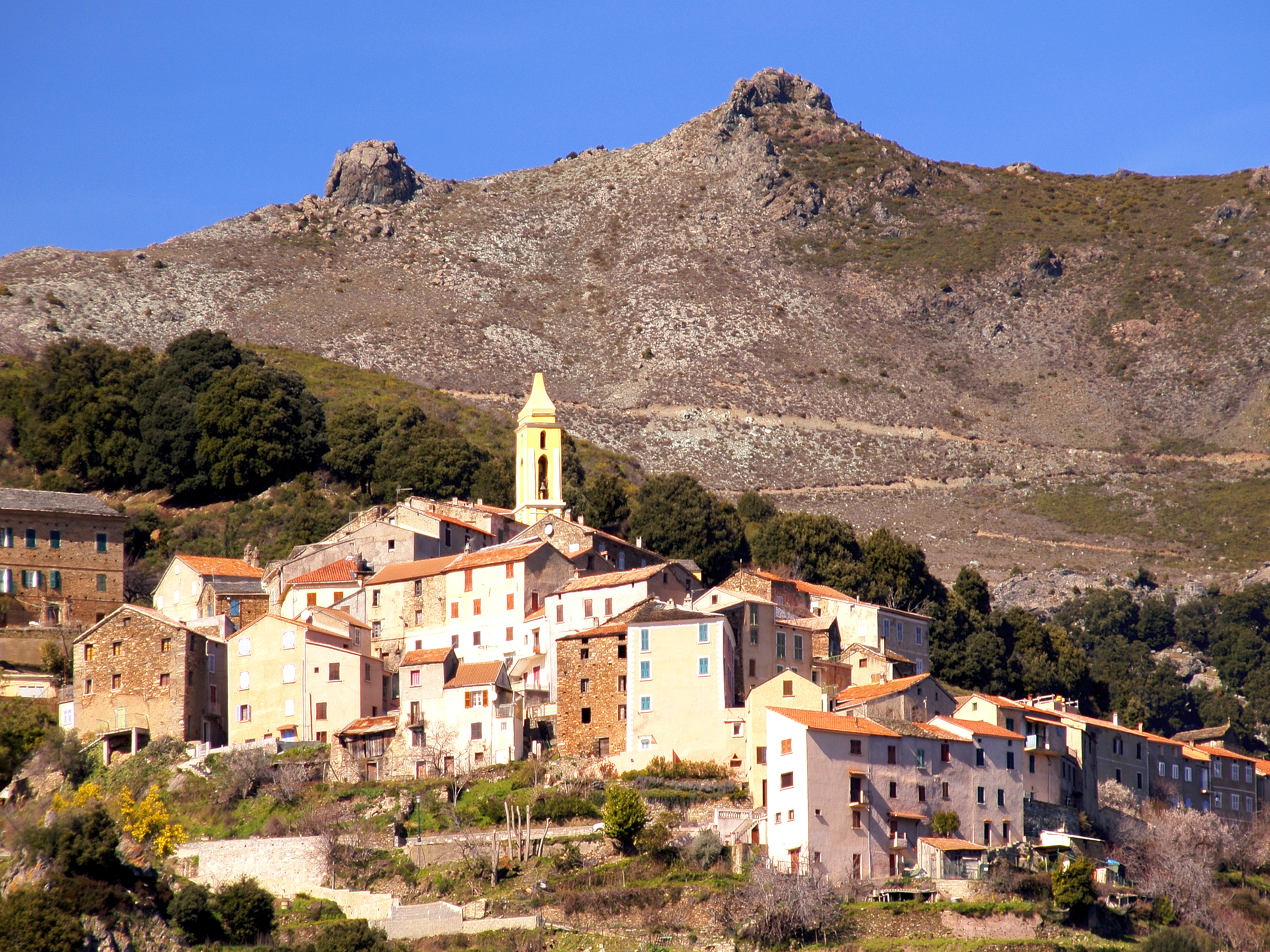
- The church and surrounding buildings in Lento
- Location of Lento
- Location within France Location within Corsica
- Coordinates: 42°31′22″N 9°16′57″E
- Country: France
- Region: Corsica
- Department: Haute-Corse
- Arrondissement: Corte
- Canton: Golo-Morosaglia

Government
  - Mayor (2020–2026): Alain Mazzoni
- Area^{1}: 23.72 km^{2} (9.16 sq mi)
- Elevation: 550 m (1,800 ft)
- Highest elevation: 1,469 m (4,820 ft)
- Lowest elevation: 131 m (430 ft)
- Population (2023): 117
  - Density: 4.93/km^{2} (12.8/sq mi)
- Time zone: UTC+01:00 (CET)
  - Summer (DST): UTC+02:00 (CEST)
- INSEE/Postal code: 2B140 /20252
- ^{1} French Land Register data, which excludes lakes, ponds, glaciers > 1 km^{2} (0.386 sq mi or 247 acres) and river estuaries.

Lento (French pronunciation: [lɛnto]; Corsican: Lentu) is a commune in the Haute-Corse department of France on the island of Corsica. Since 2015, it is part of the canton of Golo-Morosaglia. The writer Marie Ferranti was born in Lento.

== Population ==
Historical population
| Year | Pop. | ±% p.a. |
|---|---|---|
| 1968 | 156 | — |
| 1975 | 143 | −1.24% |
| 1982 | 162 | +1.80% |
| 1990 | 76 | −9.03% |
| 1999 | 91 | +2.02% |
| 2007 | 116 | +3.08% |
| 2012 | 117 | +0.17% |
| 2017 | 103 | −2.52% |
| 2023 | 117 | +2.15% |
Source: INSEE

== See also ==
- Communes of the Haute-Corse department
