= Marie Ferranti =

French writer

Marie Ferranti, real name Marie-Dominique Mariotti (French pronunciation: [maʁi fɛʁɑ̃ti]; born 1962, in Lento, Haute-Corse), is a French writer. She chose the patronym of her maternal great-grandmother as a literary pseudonym.

Her novel La Princesse de Mantoue won the Grand prix du roman de l'Académie française. She was discovered by Pascal Quignard at éditions Gallimard.

She lives and works in the town of Saint-Florent, in the Haute-Corse.

== Works ==
- 1995: Les Femmes de San Stefano, novel, (crowned by the Académie française)
- 1996: La Chambre des défunts, novel
- 2000: La Fuite aux Agriates, novel
- 2002: La Princesse de Mantoue, novel, Grand prix du roman de l'Académie française
- 2002: Le Paradoxe de l'ordre, essai sur l'œuvre romanesque de Michel Mohrt
- 2004: La Chasse de nuit, novel
- 2006: Lucie de Syracuse, novel
- 2006: La Cadillac des Montadori, novel
- 2012: Une haine de Corse. Histoire véridique de Napoléon Bonaparte et de Charles-André Pozzo di Borgo, Grand Prix du Mémorial de la ville d'Ajaccio
- 2013: Marguerite et les grenouilles. Saint Florent, chroniques, portraits et autres histoires, récits
- 2014: Les Maîtres de chant, narration
