= HMS Solebay (1785) =

1785 ship of the Royal Navy

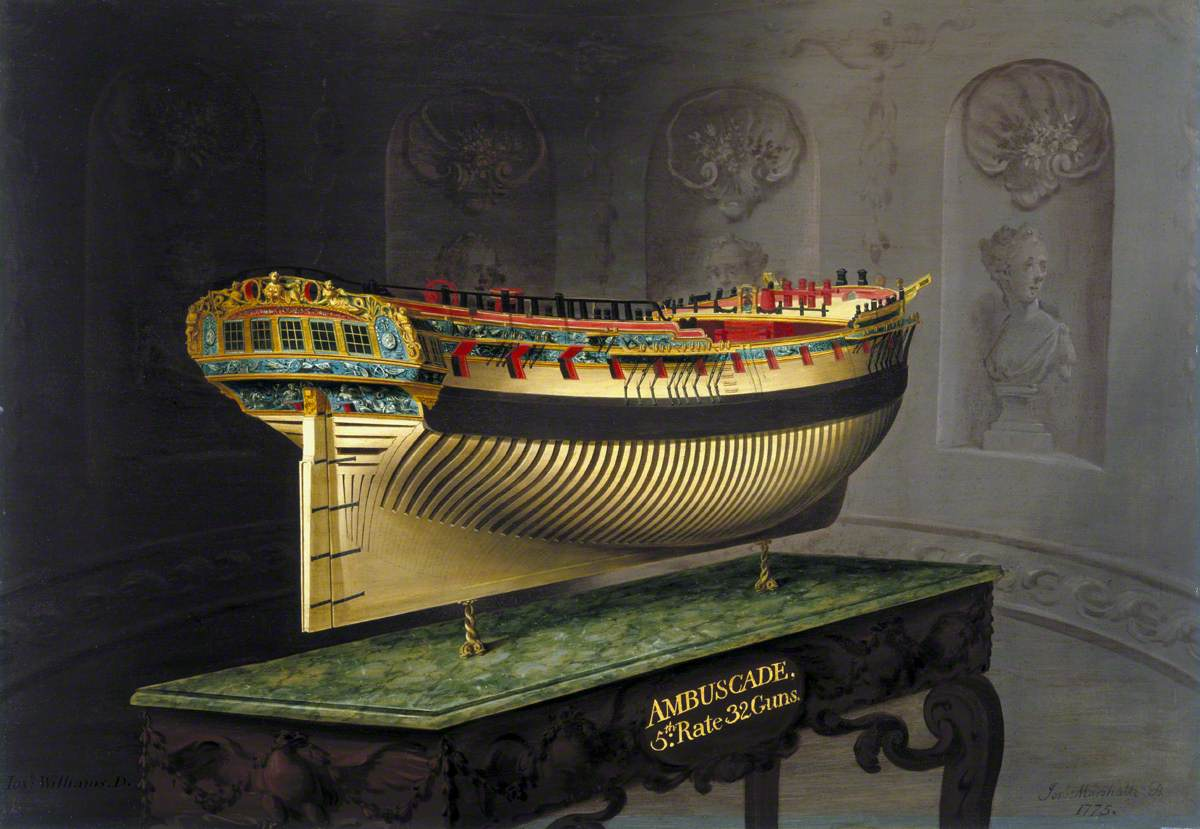
- Painting of a Navy Board model of Ambuscade, an Amazon-class frigate similar to HMS Solebay

History

Great Britain
- Name: HMS Solebay
- Namesake: Battle of Solebay
- Ordered: 23 July 1783
- Builder: Adams and Barnard, Deptford
- Laid down: May 1783
- Launched: 26 March 1785
- Completed: 23 April 1785
- Fate: Wrecked July 1809

General characteristics
- Class & type: Amazon-class frigate (1773)
- Tons burthen: 683 7/94 (bm)
- Length: 126 feet 3 1/2 inches (38.5 m) (gundeck); 104 feet 5 1/2 inches (31.8 m) (keel)
- Beam: 35 feet 0 3/4 inch (10.7 m)
- Depth of hold: 12 feet 2 1/2 inches (4 m)
- Propulsion: Sails
- Sail plan: Fully-rigged ship
- Complement: 220
- Armament: Upper deck: 26 × 12-pounder guns; Quarterdeck: 4 × 6-pounder guns + 4 x 18-pounder carronades; Forecastle: 2 × 6-pounder guns + 2 x 18-pounder carronades

HMS Solebay was a 32-gun Amazon-class frigate, built for the Royal Navy and launched in 1785. She spent much of her career serving in the West Indies, and was present at Martinique, St. Lucia and Guadeloupe, when those islands were captured from the French in 1794. She also saw short spells of service in the English Channel and the North Sea. In May 1809, following the British Parliament's decision to abolish the Atlantic slave trade in 1807, Solebay was assigned to an enforcement squadron and sailed for West Africa. Her mission was cut short in July that year, when she ran aground during an assault on the Senegalese coast, and was abandoned after damage from a shore battery.

== Construction and armament ==
Solebay was a fifth-rate frigate of the Royal Navy. Frigates of the period were three-masted, full-rigged ships that carried their main battery on a single, continuous gun deck. They were smaller and faster than ships of the line and primarily intended for raiding, reconnaissance and carrying of messages. The fifth-rate group carried between 30 and 50 guns, and included both smaller two-deckers and frigates of 32, 36 and 38 guns.

The Amazon class of 1773 were a series of eighteen, 32-gun 12-pounder (5.4 kg) frigates, designed by Sir John Williams and built between 1771 and 1787. When Solebay was ordered on 23 July 1783, she was the fifteenth of her class to be requested by the Admiralty and very nearly the last; only HMS Terpsichore and Blonde would come after, although the design would be revived as the Amazon class of 1795, a modified version that was larger and more powerful. (Note: The Amazon class of 1795 were a series of four frigates that carried 36 guns, with a main battery of 18 pounders. They were 143 feet (43.6 m) along the gun deck, compared to the 126 feet (38.4 m) of the 1773 class, and 925 87/94, compared to 677 62/94 tons burthen.)

Solebay was laid down at Deptford Dockyard in May 1783. She was launched on 26 March 1785 and, because there was no immediate use for her, completed for ordinary there, on 23 April.

Measuring 126 feet 3 1/2 inches (38.5 m) along the gun deck, 104 feet 5 1/2 inches (31.8 m) at the keel, with a beam of 35 feet 0 3/4 inch (10.7 m) and a depth in the hold of 12 feet 2 1/2 inches (4 m), Solebay came in at 683 7/94 tons burthen. She was designed to carry a main battery of 26 number 12-pounder (5.4 kg) long guns on her gun deck, with a secondary armament of four 6-pounder (2.7 kg) guns and four 18-pounder (8.2 kg) carronades on the quarterdeck, and two 6-pounder (2.7 kg) guns and two 18-pounder (8.2 kg) carronades on the forecastle. (Note: The gun-rating of a vessel was the number of long guns it was designed to carry and did not always match its actual armament. Before 1817, carronades were not counted at all unless they were direct replacements for long guns.)

== Service ==
Solebay was called into service in 1786, and fitting out began in May. She was commissioned under Captain John Holloway in July and her refit was concluded on 1 September. On 18 October, she sailed for the Leeward Islands, where she joined a squadron under the captain of HMS Boreas, Horatio Nelson. On 19 December 1787, Solebay with HMS Amphion and Rattler, escorted to Dominica, HMS Pegasus, commanded by the future king, Prince William Henry. Solebay paid off in September 1789 and was refitted and coppered at Woolwich Dockyard. The work was finished in January 1790 and on 3 March, she set sail for the Leeward Islands once more, under her new captain, Matthew Squire, who had received his commission the previous November.

Solebay paid off in 1791, then underwent a refit at Plymouth in July 1792, which took until October the following year, and cost £6,456. Captain William Kelly, assumed command in April 1793, and in 1794, Solebay joined the British fleet under Vice-admiral Sir John Jervis in the West Indies.

On 2 February Jervis' fleet and 6,100 troops under Lieutenant-general Sir Charles Grey left Barbados. The troops were landed on Martinique on 5 February and by 16 March had gained control of the whole island, save the town of Fort Royal and the forts Bourbon and Louis. Seaman and marines from the fleet then joined the troops in laying siege to the town and the forts. Kelly and members of Solebay's crew, aided in the reduction of fort Bourbon and the whole of Martinique had surrendered by 22 March. Leaving a contingent to hold the island, the British left for St Lucia on 31 March, capturing it on 4 April. Jervis then took the fleet to Guadeloupe, forcing the capitulation of Grande-Terre and Basse-Terre on 12 and 20 April respectively. On 19 April, Solebay and HMS Winchelsea escorted troops, aboard HMS Veteran and Vanguard, to the bay of Anse Canot and provided cover for the landings. The initial location for debarkation, Gosier bay on the south coast of Grande Terre, was considered unsafe due to the surf and challenging geography. The troops were landed without loss of life and that same evening, Solebay and Winchelsea returned to Gosier to pick up water and other supplies for the camp. Jervis received intelligence on 26 April that a French frigate and three transport ships had been sighted of Grande Terre, and immediately despatched Solebay and Winchelsea to verify the information.

Solebay was still in the West Indies in February 1795, when she captured a 16-gun privateer but had returned home by May 1797, at which point she underwent a refit at Portsmouth. The work took until October and cost £14,741. In August, she was recommissioned under Captain Stephen Poyntz and in November, set sail for the Leeward Islands once more. She remained on that station until the last quarter of 1800 and made several captures during that time, including a 2-gun schooner, Augustine, off Antigua on 17 March 1798, the 4-gun Destin off Martinique on 13 June and the 8-gun Prosperite at the end of the year. On 24 November 1799, Solebay captured four privateers off San Domingo; the 18-gun Egyptienne, the 16-gun corvette, Eole, the 12-gun Levrier and the 8-gun Vengeur. The latter was previously HM Schooner Charlotte.

Towards the end of 1800, Solebay returned to England and paid off. She was recommissioned in 1801 under Captain Thomas Dundas for service in the English Channel. Much of her time in the Channel was spent on convoy duty. On 9 August 1801, she left Portsmouth harbour with three East Indiamen which she escorted to The Downs. The merchantmen had arrived from Cork at Portsmouth on 3 August and had been waiting for an escort for the next stage of their journey, since. Solebay escorted ships bound for Gibraltar, out of Portsmouth on 26 August 1801 and sailed from there to Sheerness on 10 July 1802. On 10 November 1807 she was forced into Plymouth by a storm that was so violent that it pushed the ship onto her beam ends. The wind, blowing from the south-west, was so strong that it kept all the ships at Plymouth in port. She was finally able to leave at 17:00 on 17 November, part of a squadron under Sir Sidney Smith which also included HMS London of 98 guns, and the seventy-fours Bedford, Monarch, Marlborough and Elizabeth.

On 16 March 1807, the British Parliament passed the Abolition of the Slave Trade Act and the West Africa Squadron was formed the following year to enforce it. Other than during the Peace of Amiens, Britain had been fighting a global conflict against France since 1793, and ships were in short supply. The Admiralty therefore was initially only willing to appoint two vessels to the task, the brig-sloop HMS Derwent and the by now elderly Solebay. Derwent, under Commander Frederick Parker, was quickly despatched, sailing from Portsmouth for West Africa in November, but Solebay had to wait for a suitable captain to become available.

Captain Edward Henry Columbine had been working with the Hydrographer of the Navy, based in London, and was appointed to command Solebay after Lord Castlereagh requested someone with experience of coastal surveying. Columbine boarded his ship, lying at Spithead, on 6 September 1808, and following an inspection reported that she would benefit from a refit. He was particularly concerned with the state of the rigging and the guns, which he feared were badly pitted in the bore. The work was quickly undertaken and Solebay was back on her mooring by 6 October. There were long delays however, while Columbine demanded better provisions for his crew, a 12-pound carronade to use in the ship's boats, and Portsmouth wherries in which to carry out his mapping of the African coast.

In April 1809, William Wilberforce took a personal interest in the stagnation of Columbine's mission, as did Castlereagh, who had wanted the survey work to start the previous year. On 9 April, the Admiralty issued orders for Solebay to escort a convoy of merchantmen bound for Sierra Leone. Still though, she remained at anchor, possibly because the convoy had yet to be assembled. Columbine was also waiting on two other armed vessels that he had been promised for his command, an issue that was partially resolved on 12 April when he was joined by the gun-brig HMS Tigress (1808), carrying fourteen 12-pounder (5.4 kg) carronades.

Eventually, on 5 May, Solebay, Tigress and nine merchant vessels left Spithead for West Africa, arriving at Goree, Senegal, by the middle of June. The garrison's commander, Major Charles Maxwell, concerned about the effect privateers from St Louis were having on coastal trade, proposed an attack on the French colony. Columbine agreed to help and by July, a variety of watercraft had been assembled for the mission. These comprised a collection of small armed vessels along with Solebay, Derwent, Tigress, the colonial schooner, George and the transport Agincourt. In order to make the force appear more powerful, two unarmed merchantmen were also requisitioned. Maxwell provided 160 soldiers from the Royal African Corps, who boarded Agincourt, and on 4 July the flotilla set sail. Arriving at the mouth of the Senegal river at night on 7 July, the ships anchored, it being thought prudent to await daylight before attempting to cross the dangerous sandbar at the entrance. The only navigable portion, which was hard to locate amongst the crashing surf, was a 400 feet (120 m) wide section providing a mere 11 feet (3.4 m) clearance, insufficient for Agincourt. The following morning, the troops, together with 120 sailors and 50 marines were loaded into boats. George passed through first, in order to take soundings, followed by the boats, under the escort of Solebay, Derwent and Tigress. One of the boats capsized during the attempt, killing two officers including Parker, and six seamen, and George ran aground shortly after entering the river. While troops were landed to protect the stricken schooner, the French had retreated 12 miles upstream to the fortified trading post of Babague. It took two days to free the George, Lieutenant Daniel Woodriff of Solebay being given much credit for the successful operation.

On 11 July, the expedition moved off with Solebay's first lieutenant, Joseph Tetley, now in command of Derwent following the death of Parker. At Babague, the garrison, comprising 160 regular soldiers and 240 militia, had stretched a boom across the river. Seven gunboats patrolled behind this, while on shore, there was a battery of twenty-eight 24-pounder (11 kg) long guns, with four mortars, four howitzers and 16 smaller guns. Columbine and a portion of the crew assisted in land operations, while the remainder, under the master, Daniel Lye, took the Solebay close to the enemy position and, supported by the Derwent, began a bombardment. At 20:00, concerned that the French might launch a cutting out expedition from the shore, Lye ordered the ship to be moved further out, but the strong currents took her downriver, where she became entangled with the Derwent. Crews managed to free her but Solebay was swept inshore, where she struck bottom. The anchor was dropped while some of the crew jettisoned ballast and shot in order to refloat her, while the remainder, who were still able to bring the guns to bear, kept up fire on the enemy. A little before 21:00 the wind picked up, so the cable was cut and an attempt was made to sail her out of trouble. The wind suddenly died, however, and the ship was forced back towards the shore where she grounded again. A further attempt was made to lighten the ship but a plan to kedge her off could not be put into action because all the ship’s boats had been used to land troops. When dawn broke, Solebay came under fire from shore batteries, which by mid-afternoon had shot away the rigging, damaged the masts and yards extensively, and holed the hull fourteen times. Later that day, news was received that the French intended to surrender. When Maxwell entered Babague, he found it abandoned and the boom broken. The capitulation was signed on 13 July and St Louis and its dependencies were relinquished to Britain. Over several days stores were removed from Solebay, which was abandoned on 17 July.
