= HMS Resolution (1779) =

Brig of the Royal Navy

History

Great Britain
- Name: HMS Resolution
- Acquired: 1779
- In service: 1779
- Out of service: 1797
- Fate: Foundered June 1797

General characteristics
- Tons burthen: 198 (bm)
- Sail plan: Cutter, later brig (1797)
- Complement: 60 (originally 70)
- Armament: 14 × 4-pounder guns + 10 × ½-pounder swivel guns

HMS Resolution was a cutter that the Royal Navy purchased in 1779. She captured two French privateers in 1781 and a Dutch privateer in 1783 after a single ship action. Resolution captured one more small French privateer in June 1797; later that month Resolution went missing in the North Sea, presumed to have foundered.

== Career ==
Lieutenant J. Douglas commissioned Resolution in 1780.

On 27 March 1780, Resolution and another cutter, Sprightly, captured the cutter Larke.

Next, Sprightly, Resolution, and the tender Union captured the brig Susanna on 8 April.

At some point prior to November 1780 Resolution and Ranger captured the lugger Good Intent.

On 25 August 1781 Resolution captured the French privateers Cerf Volant and Bien Venue, each of ten guns. (Note: Cerf Volant was a 90-ton privateer from Dunkirk, under François-René Granger, with 40 men and 10 guns (six carriage guns and four swivel guns). Granger was reportedly North American.) (Note: Bien Venu, of Dunkirk and 10 carriage guns and six swivel guns, had a crew of 41 men under the command of Captain Louis le Chevalier. At the time of the capture, the British privateer Antigallican was in sight. Resolution took Bien Venu into Tinmouth.)

Lieutenant Israel Pellew took command of Resolution in the North Sea in 1782. On 20 January 1783 Resolution encountered a Dutch privateer some six leagues of Flamborough Head. After a chase of 14 hours caught up with her. An action of an hour and half ensued during which the Dutch vessel had her first captain and first lieutenant killed, and seven men wounded before she struck. The Dutch vessel, named Flushinger, was pierced for fourteen guns and carried twelve 4-pounders; she had a crew of 68 men. Only one seaman was wounded on Resolution.

Pellew retained command when she was transferred to the Irish station. He remained in command until 1787. Resolution was paid off in 1788. In May 1789 Lieutenant Bayntun Prideaux recommissioned her for the Channel.

She was recommissioned in October 1792 and placed under the command of Lieutenant Edward H. Columbine, for the Larne station. She sailed to the Mediterranean in 1794 and remained there until 1796. She was at the Battle of the Hyères Islands (13 July 1795), but only some ships of the line actually participated in the action.

On 16 July 1796 Resolution, Lieutenant Columbine, captured Aurora.

Resolution was part of a squadron under Admiral Cuthbert Collingwood, in Excellent, and also containing Sardine, at Bastia before the British evacuated it in October.

In 1797 Lieutenant William Huggett assumed command. On 3 June 1797 Resolution captured the French privateer Pichegru, of one long 6-pounder gun and 39 men. The capture took place some seven leagues south of the Start. Pichegru was two days out of Saint-Malo and had not captured anything. (Note: Pichegru was a 100-ton privateer from Saint-Malo, commissioned in 1796 or 1797. She was under a Captain I. Branzon with 35 men.) (Note: A prize money notice refers to Resolution as a brig. She may have undergone conversion from cutter to brig in early 1797.)

== Fate ==
Resolution went missing in the North Sea in June 1797, presumed to have foundered.
