= French corvette Sardine =

Sardine
History

France
- Name: Sardine
- Namesake: Sardine
- Ordered: 7 February 1770
- Builder: Toulon Dockyard (Constructeur:Broquier)
- Laid down: June 1770
- Launched: 14 July 1771
- In service: 1772
- Captured: 9 March 1796

Great Britain
- Name: Sardine
- Acquired: 1796 by capture
- Fate: Sold in 1806

General characteristics
- Displacement: 280 tons (French)
- Tons burthen: 300 (bm)
- Length: 34.43 m (113.0 ft)
- Beam: 8.77 m (28.8 ft)
- Draught: 3.68 m (12.1 ft) (unloaded)
- Depth of hold: 4.30 m (14.1 ft)
- Sail plan: Full-rigged ship
- Complement: 86–100
- Armament: 16 × 6-pounder guns

Sardine was a corvette of the French Navy, launched in 1771. The Royal Navy captured her at the Siege of Toulon but the French retook her when the Anglo-Spanish force retreated. The Royal Navy captured her again in 1796. She then served as HMS Sardine until the Royal Navy sold her in 1806.

== French career ==
Sardine was built to a design by Joseph-Marie-Blaise Coulomb. She was pierced for 18 guns but carried 16.

She served in the Mediterranean during the Ancien Régime. In 1792 she was under the command of Lieutenant de vaiseau the chevalier de Bellon de Sainte-Marguerite and served as an escort in the Levant. She was at Smyrna in March, and then cruised the Aegean Sea. Next, she escorted a convoy from Smyrna to Cape Matapan, and then protected French trade between Tripoli (Syria) and Alexandria. Lastly, she escorted a convoy from Cyprus to Marseilles in October.

In August 1793 an Anglo-Spanish force captured Toulon and Royalist forces turned over to them the French naval vessels in the port. When the Anglo-Spanish force had to leave in December, they took with them the best vessels and tried to burn the remainder. Although some reports have the Anglo-Spanish forces capturing her and then leaving her behind, she does not appear on an English list of vessels captured, burnt, or otherwise disposed of.

On 9 December 1795, Sardine was part of Gantaume's squadron. She, the frigate Sensible, and the corvette Rossignol captured the 28-gun HMS Nemesis, which had grounded and after refloating had anchored out of range of the fort in the neutral port of Smyrna. The French warships entered the harbour in disregard of its neutrality and called on Nemesis to surrender, which she did when the French refused to honour the port's neutrality and fired on Nemesis. Three men from Nemesis, a sailor and two Royal Marines, defected to the French and joined Sardine. (Note: Rossignol, which had been launched in 1769, was apparently taken out of service at Smyrna and is last mentioned in February 1796.)

== Capture ==
On 9 March 1796, Nemesis was anchored in the neutral harbour of Tunis, together with Postillon, and Sardine, under the command of Enseigne de vaisseau non entretenu Icard (acting). The British sent a squadron under the command of Vice-Admiral William Waldegrave to recapture Nemesis. Boats from HMS Egmont, Barfleur, and Bombay Castle] attacked the French ships and captured all three. The squadron also included Zealous, Tartar, and the cutter Fox. The British took the three men who had defected from Nemesis to Sardine and hanged them.

Admiral Jervis sent Nemesis, Sardine, and Postillon to Ajaccio. (Lloyd's List reported that Barfleur escorted Nemesis and Sardine to San Fiorenzo. Jervis had Postillon repaired and painted before selling her to Sir Gilbert Elliot the British viceroy of the Anglo-Corsican Kingdom, for onward transfer to the Dey of the Regency of Algiers. Nemesis returned to British service and Sardine was brought into the Royal Navy.

== British service ==
Sardine was brought into British service as the sloop-of-war HMS Sardine and commissioned under Commander W. Wilkinson. By July Jervis had appointed Commander Edward Killwick, of Saturn, to command her. In July 1796, Admiral Lord Nelson took Sardine with him to blockade Leghorn but remarked:

The Sardine cannot move in light airs, she is so very foul; and to say the truth, she has not the men to manage her, although I am sure that Captain Killwick does all in his power.

On 15 September 1796 Sardine captured the Spanish brig St. Juan Baptise. On 20 September Sardine attempted to enter the port at Genoa but was driven away by gunfire. Sardine was part of a squadron under Admiral Cuthbert Collingwood, in Excellent, and also containing the cutter Resolution, at Bastia before the British evacuated it in October.

In early 1797 Dido and Sardine escorted a convoy of 13 merchantmen from Elba to Gibraltar. In March Commander A. Kempe took command of Sardine. Then Commander Edward Killwick replaced Kempe in May. Sardine was formally named and registered on 27 June 1798.

In May 1798 Killwick was appointed to command the Southwark Sea Fencibles. Sardine then essentially disappears from view. As Nelson had already remarked that she was foul, it is highly likely that Killwick had sailed her to Britain where she was paid off, registered, and ignored.

== Fate ==
From 1805, she was at Portsmouth in ordinary. She was offered for sale in September 1806, and was sold later that year and broken up.
