= Cornish Hero (1797 ship) =

Cornish Hero first appeared in easily accessible records when Captain John Hartney acquired a letter of marque on 4 March 1797. She had a burthen of 182 tons and a crew of 80 men, indicating that she was a privateer. She carried fourteen 6–pounder guns and eight swivel guns. On 20 March, Hartney sailed from Falmouth on a cruise.

The French frigate Justice captured Cornish Hero in the Mediterranean in late 1797, and took her into Corfu (Corcyre in French),. The French Navy took her into service as Corcyre. (Note: One source states that Cornish Hero was a Malta-based privateer built in Venice, but that appears to be a conflation with another vessel. When the French fleet sailed to Malta, it took with them some Venetian vessels.) Corcyre, armed with 10 guns, then escorted convoys departing from Corsica and bound for Egypt to support the French campaign in Egypt and Syria.

On 1 or 2 June 1798, HMS Flora captured the 16-gun Corcyre off Sardinia. Her commander was Lieutenant de vaisseau Renault. Corcyre was part of the French fleet sailing to take Malta. The French fleet left Genoa and Citavechia Roads 20–21 May. Corcyre was sailing ahead of the fleet towards Marettimo when Flora captured her.

The Royal Navy did not take Corcyre into service. Cornish Hero became a West Indiaman that was wrecked at Martinique early in 1800. She was on a voyage from Liverpool to the West Indies.
