= Charles William Maxwell =

British soldier and colonial administrator

Lieutenant-General Sir Charles William Maxwell CB (1775 – 23 September 1848, Broadstairs) was a British soldier and colonial administrator.

He was the eldest son of Charles Maxwell of Terraughty, Dumfriesshire and his third wife, Helen Douglas.

He joined the British Army in 1796. He was knighted in 1836 and was appointed Lieutenant General in 1841. He was appointed Colonel of the 3rd West India Regiment in 1843.

== Cape Mesurado raid ==
Cape Mesurado was being used as a base for the slave trade and in 1815 Maxwell, then Governor of Sierra Leone, sent an armed force to raid the settlement, seizing ships, merchandise and enslaved Africans from the factories there. The factory owners were sentenced to fourteen years' transportation to New South Wales by the vice admiralty court.

Preceded by Robert Bones	Governor of Sierra Leone; 1 July 1811 – July 1815	Succeeded by Charles McCarthy
Military offices
Preceded by	Colonel of the 3rd West India Regiment; 1843–1848	Succeeded by Sir Guy Campbell
