= HMS Tigress (1808) =

Gunvessel of the Royal Navy

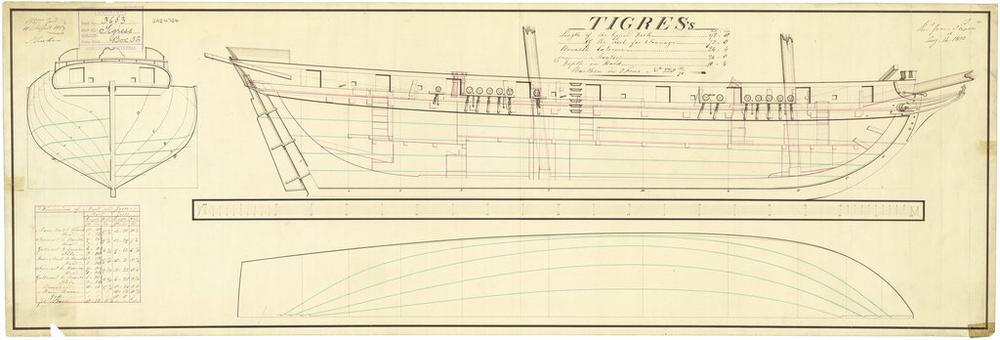
- Lines & profile plan for Tigress, drawn in 1810

History

United States
- Name: Numa
- Builder: Baltimore
- Launched: 1801
- Renamed: Pierre Cézar (1808)
- Captured: 29 June 1808

United Kingdom
- Name: HMS Tigress
- Acquired: 29 June 1808 by capture
- Renamed: HMS Algerine on 21 April 1814
- Fate: Sold on 29 January 1818 for breaking up

General characteristics
- Tons burthen: 22931/94 bm
- Length: 92 ft 9 in (28.3 m) (overall); 72 ft 9 3/4 in (22.2 m) (keel)
- Beam: 24 ft 4 in (7.4 m)
- Depth of hold: 10 ft 9 in (3.3 m)
- Propulsion: Sails
- Complement: 50 (British service)
- Armament: French letter of marque: 4 × 18-pounder carronades + 2 × 6-pounder guns; British service: 14 × 12-pounder carronades

HMS Tigress was the American merchantman Numa and then French letter of marque Pierre Cézar that the Royal Navy acquired by capture and put into service as the gunbrig Tigress. She spent some time on the West African coast in the suppression of the Triangular slave trade. The Admiralty later renamed her as Algerine. She was broken up in 1818.

== Merchantman ==
Tigress was originally launched around 1801 in Baltimore, Maryland, as Numa. There is a record of her taking a half-dozen Irish passengers to the United States in 1803.

Numa sailed in April 1808 from New York for Saint Barthélemy, which was then a Swedish colony, but arrived at Saint-Pierre, Martinique. There French merchants bought her and fitted her out as the letter-of-marque Pierre Cézar (equally Pierre César or Pierre Czar or Pierre Caesar) and armed her with two 6-pounder guns and four 18-pounder carronades, though she was pierced for 18 guns.

On 29 May she sailed from Saint Pierre for L'Orient with a cargo of sugar, coffee, and cotton. One month later, on 29 June, the 40-gun frigate HMS Seine captured her after a four-hour-and-twenty-minute chase off the Spanish coast. Pierre Cézar was a fast sailer and her American mate claimed that the frigate would not have caught her had she not been overloaded. Comet, HMS Unicorn (1794) and Cossack shared in the capture.

== British service ==
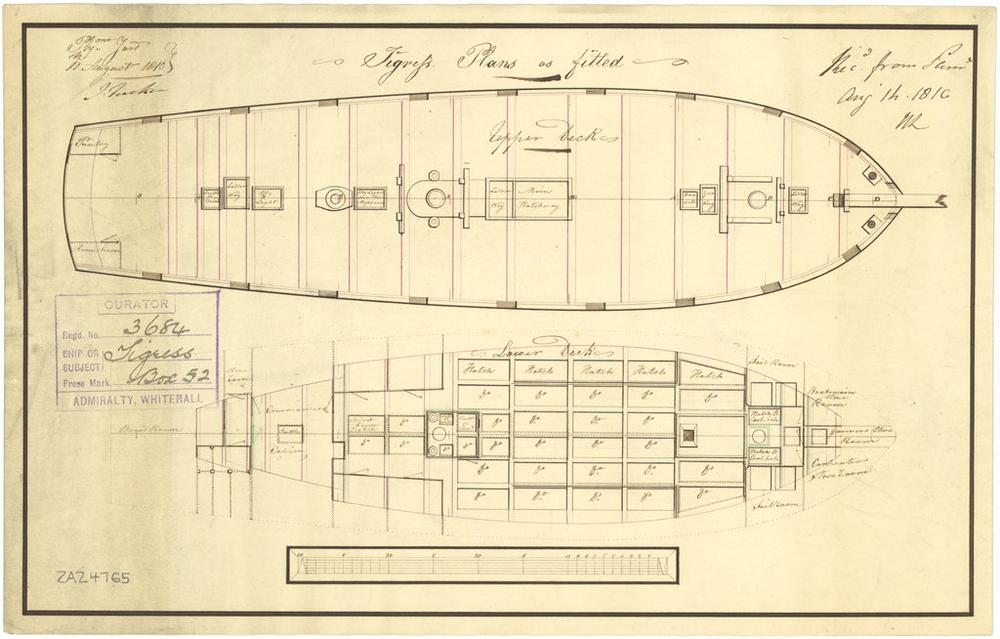
Upper deck plan for the Tigress

The Admiralty bought Pierre Cézar for almost £2266 and took her into service as Tigress, her predecessor Tigress having been lost earlier that year to the Danes, who captured her near Agerso in the Great Belt. The Navy fitted out Tigress at Plymouth, arming her with fourteen 12-pounder carronades and commissioning her in October 1808 under Lieutenant Robert Bones.

Tigress sailed to Spithead where on 12 April 1809 she joined the 32-gun fifth-rate frigate HMS Solebay, preparing to sail to the West African coast as part of the nascent West Africa Squadron. The squadron of 11 vessels left on 5 May.

Early in her time on the West African coast Tigress was involved in an attack on the French colony in Senegal in July 1809, that aimed to curtail the activities of privateers. The attack resulted in the capture of the colony, which remained in British hands until 1817. The expedition's success was bought at the cost of the loss to grounding of Solebay, though Solebay's entire crew was saved. Tigress removed the stores from Solebay, and then cruises the Senegambian coast for several months before sailing to the Canaries for supplies.

On her way back from the Canaries Tigress lost both masts to a gale. On 3 February 1810 Tigress encountered Crocodile, which had come out to join the West Africa squadron. The two vessels sailed in company to Freetown, though Tigress lost her main topmast on the way. From Freetown Tigress sailed to the Rio Pongas and the Îles de Los.

Tigress proceeded finally to make some captures.

- Rayo (24 March 1810); Spanish brig captured off Rio Pongas. She landed 129 slaves at Sierra Leone, though a British or Mixed Commission court returned her to her owners.
- Lucia (3 April 1810): Tigress captured Lucia off Rio Pongas and the Vice admiralty court at Freetown condemned her. There is no record how many slaves, if any the capture freed.

On 10 May Tigress sailed for home and a refit. She returned quickly and made further captures.

- Pez Volador (August 1810): She was a Spanish schooner that Tigress captured off the Îles de Los. Although the court restored Pez Volador to her owners, still 82 slaves received their freedom.
- Marquis de Romana (22 September 1810): Tigress captured the British ship off Badagry and landed 101 slaves at Freetown where the court condemned the slave ship.
- Elizabeth (4 April 1811): Tigress captured Elizabeth, an American vessel, off Cape Mount and brought her into Freetown where the court condemned her. Eighty-seven slaves received their freedom.

The Vice-Admiralty Court at Sierra Leone declared both Marquis de Romana and Elizabeth as "forfeited to His Majesty for offences committed against the Act for the abolition of the slave trade".

From mid-May until end-June, Lieutenant Bones was acting governor of Sierra Leone. While he was acting governor, Tigress remained at Freetown. However her boats continued to patrol for slave ships.

In July Tigress's boats took possession of Capac, which the mercantile brig Telegraph had brought in. The court condemned Capac as "Droits of Admiralty".

Lastly, Tigress seized the Portuguese ship Paquette Volante and the Portuguese schooner Urbano on 26 August off Cabinda. The court returned both to their owners. However, 38 and 59 slaves received their freedom.

Between 18 and 27 September Tigress was in the River Pongas retrieving the schooner George, which had grounded there.

On 20 February 1812 Lieutenant Bones left Tigress; he would receive promotion to commander shortly thereafter. Lieutenant William Carnegie replaced Bones.

Tigress sailed for Cape Coast Castle and Accra on 12 April. There she loaded ivory and gold dust. She finally sailed for Britain on 31 May after almost three years with the West Africa Squadron. Duringher tour of duty she had made eight seizures that had resulted in the freeing of almost 500 slaves.

Tigress returned to England at the end of July 1812. On 5 August Tigress was one of many British ships that shared in the capture of the Asia. (Note: Bones's share may have been £9 10s 10d; an ordinary seaman got 2s 6d. This would amount to about two days wages.) In the autumn Lieutenant William Carnegie took command of Tigress at Plymouth.

== Algerine ==
Tigress went on to serve in the Baltic in 1813 under Lieutenant Robert Henderson. In 1814 the Navy converted Tigress to a 14-gun cutter and on 21 April 1814 renamed her Algerine, Algerine (1810), having been wrecked the previous year.

Algerine was recommissioned in August 1816 under her last commander, Lieutenant William Price. On 12 December, her boats, together with those of the revenue cutter Harpy, Lieutenant Hugh Anderson, picked up 110 kegs of spirits at sea. The London Gazette announced that on 15 August 1817 the monies due as a result of picking up these kegs of spirits at sea would shortly be ready for payment.

On 14 December Algerine was the last vessel to see HMS Mistletoe before Mistletoe disappeared in a storm.

== Fate ==
The Principal officers and Commissioners of His Majesty's Navy offered the "Algerine cutter, of 229 tons", for sale at Portsmouth on 29 January 1818. Algerine sold there on that date to Thomas Pittman for £450.
