= Edward H. Columbine =

English naval officer and hydrographer (fl. 1792–1811)

Captain Edward H. Columbine
- Born: 2 July 1763; Westminster
- Died: 18 June 1811 (aged 47) HMS Crocodile, at sea
- Allegiance: Kingdom of Great Britain
- Branch: Royal Navy
- Service years: 1778–1811
- Rank: Captain
- Commands: HMS Resolution; HMS Ulysses; West Africa Squadron; HMS Solebay; HMS Crocodile
- Known for: Hydrography; Anti-slavery operations
- Conflicts: American Revolutionary War; Battle of the Saintes; French Revolutionary War; Napoleonic Wars
- Education: The King's School, Canterbury
- Spouses: Anna Maria Starr (m. 1787) Anne Curry (m. 1801–1810)

Captain Edward Henry Columbine (2 July 1763 – 18 June 1811) was an English naval officer and hydrographer who served as Governor of Sierra Leone from 12 February 1810 – May 1811.

Columbine was given command of HMS Resolution in 1792–1796 and participated in the Battle of Genoa, 14 March 1795.

Columbine had already been appointed alongside William Dawes and Thomas Ludlam to carry out a review of the forts and Settlements in British West Africa when Lord Castlereagh asked him to take over a governor of Sierra Leone from Thomas Perronet Thompson. Whilst Dawes and Ludlam proceeded to inspect settlements along the West African Coast, Columbine stayed in Sierra Leone to deal with the colonies affairs.

Preceded by Thomas Perronet Thompson	Governor of Sierra Leone; 12 February 1810 – May 1811.	Succeeded by Robert Bones (acting)
