= Saint-Florent, Haute-Corse =

Saint-Florent San Fiurenzu (Corsican)
- Commune
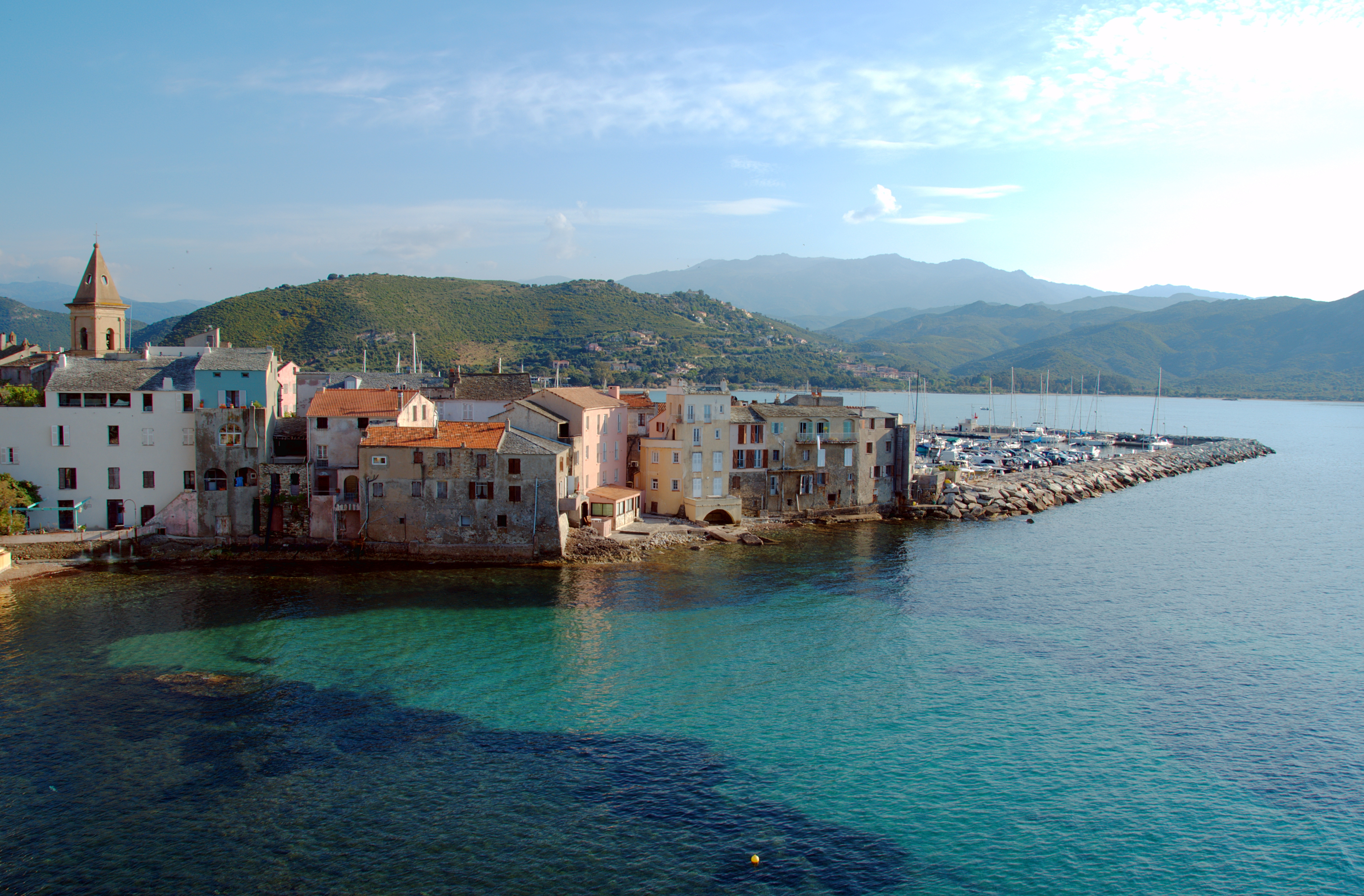
- Citadel

- Coat of arms
- Location of Saint-Florent
- Location within France Location within Corsica
- Coordinates: 42°40′54″N 9°18′11″E
- Country: France
- Region: Corsica
- Department: Haute-Corse
- Arrondissement: Calvi
- Canton: Biguglia-Nebbio

Government
  - Mayor (2020–2026): Claudy Olmeta
- Area^{1}: 17.98 km^{2} (6.94 sq mi)
- Elevation: 10 m (33 ft)
- Highest elevation: 356 m (1,168 ft)
- Lowest elevation: 0 m (0 ft)
- Population (2023): 1,694
  - Density: 94.22/km^{2} (244.0/sq mi)
- Demonym(s): French: Saint-Florentin, Saint-Florentine; Italian: Sanfiorenzinco, Sanfiorenzinca; Corsican: Sanfiurenzincu, Sanfiurenzinca
- Time zone: UTC+01:00 (CET)
  - Summer (DST): UTC+02:00 (CEST)
- INSEE/Postal code: 2B298 /20217
- ^{1} French Land Register data, which excludes lakes, ponds, glaciers > 1 km^{2} (0.386 sq mi or 247 acres) and river estuaries.

Saint-Florent (French pronunciation: [sɛ̃ flɔʁɑ̃]; Italian: San Fiorenzo, [saɱ fjoˈrɛntso]; Corsican: San Fiurenzu, [saɱ fjuˈrɛntsu]) is a commune in Haute-Corse department on the island of Corsica, France. Originally a fishing port located in the gulf of the same name, pleasure boats have now largely taken the place of fishing vessels.

Today, it is a popular summer vacation spot for many tourists because of its proximity to the Patrimonio vineyards and the Saleccia beach.

== History ==
Saint-Florent was created by the Genoese in the 16th century as a base to carry out repressive operations against the Corsican patriots in the surrounding villages. France later used it to disembark hordes of mercenaries and colonists during August 1764 in order to subjugate the independent Corsican people. After the defeat at Ponte Novu Bridge, the army of Pasquale Paoli, sometimes called "the Father of Corsica", with the aid of the fleet of Horatio Nelson, reconquered Saint-Florent in 1794 during Corsica's brief Anglo-Corsican rule.

== Population ==
Historical population
Year	Pop.	±% p.a.
1968	805	—
1975	1,065	+4.08%
1982	1,217	+1.92%
1990	1,350	+1.30%
1999	1,474	+0.98%
2007	1,635	+1.30%
2012	1,609	−0.32%
2017	1,655	+0.57%
2023	1,694	+0.39%
Source: INSEE

== Climate ==
Saint-Florent has a typically Mediterranean climate - mild winters with temperatures rarely dropping below zero give way to long, warm, dry summers with temperatures peaking at around 35 °C (95 °F) in July and August.

== Sights ==
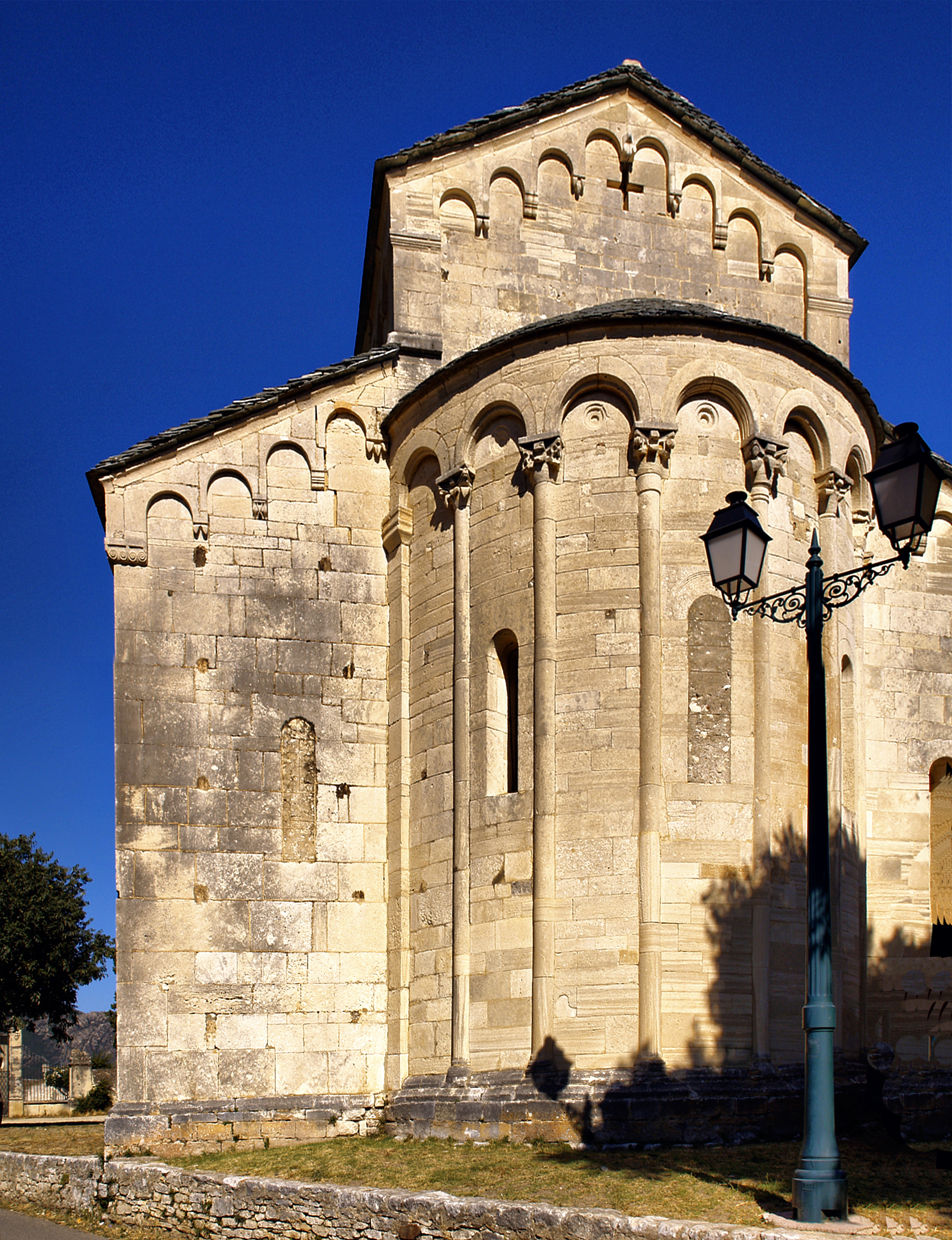
Saint-Florent Cathedral

The monuments of Saint-Florent are the Genoese citadel constructed in 1440 at the same time as the city, and the Romanesque Saint-Florent Cathedral, or the cathedral of the Nebbio, now the church of Santa Maria Assunta.

Near the village are the Genoese towers Torra di Mortella and Torra di Fornali.

== Notable people ==
- Louis Bizarelli, former politician, was born at Saint-Florent in 1836.
- Lizzy Mercier Descloux, musician and singer, spent her last years in Saint-Florent. She died there in 2004.
- Marie Ferranti, author, lives and works in Saint-Florent.
- Antoine Gentili, general and exile companion of Pasquale Paoli.

== See also ==
- Communes of the Haute-Corse department
