= French frigate Justice =

Virgine-class frigate

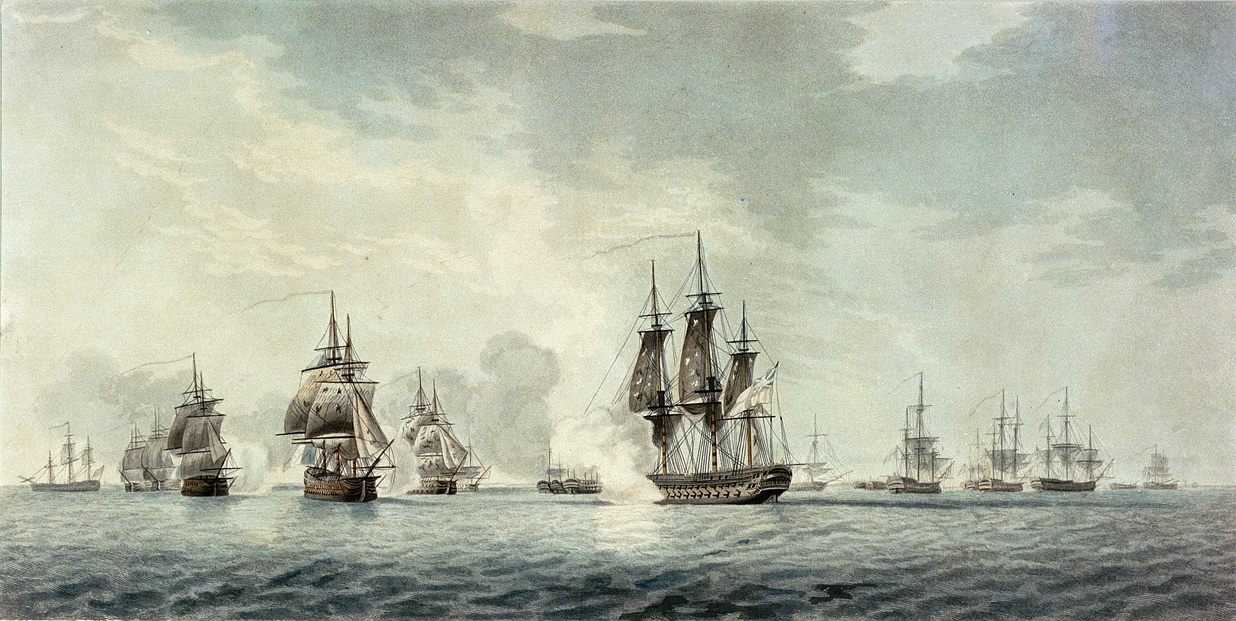
- Justice (second from left) at the Battle of the Nile, 1798

History

France
- Name: Courageuse
- Builder: Jacques-Nöel Sané, Brest
- Laid down: December 1793
- Launched: August 1794
- In service: December 1794
- Out of service: 27 September 1801
- Renamed: Justice
- Captured: 27 September 1801
- Fate: Transferred to the Ottoman Navy after capture

General characteristics
- Class & type: Virginie-class frigate
- Displacement: 1,390 tonneaux
- Tons burthen: 720 port tonneaux
- Length: 47.4 m (156 ft)
- Beam: 11.9 m (39 ft)
- Draught: 5.5 m (18 ft)
- Armament: 40 guns (though pierced for 44 guns) 28x18 pounder cannon and 12x12 pounder cannon

Courageuse was a 40-gun Virginie-class frigate of the French Navy, completed in 1794 and renamed Justice in April 1795. The British and Ottomans captured her in 1801 at the siege of Alexandria and she became a prize to the Ottomans.

== Career ==
Justice was named Courageuse on 5 October 1794 in error; there was already a Courageuse in service. She was renamed Justice on 20 April 1795.

Between January and September 1796 Justice was in the Dardanelles, under the command of capitaine de vaisseau Dalbarde, and sailed from Constantinople to Toulon. From 14 May 1797 to 11 June she as at Toulon, cruising the Italian coast. From 27 June to 21 April 1798 Justice sailed from Toulon to Corfu, then to the Adriatic, and lastly she participated in the French expedition to Egypt.

In late 1797 Justice captured the British privateers Cornish Hero and Fortune and took them into Corfu.

Between 23 July 1798 and 25 July Justice was at Aboukir. After the frigate Junon ran aground in Aboukir, Justice escorted her to Alexandria for repairs.

On 2 August Justice was under the command of Captain Jean Villeneuve and participated in the battle of the Nile. She and Diane sailed in the morning and so escaped. Justice arrived at Valletta on 28 August 1798.

Between 24 August 1800 and 1 September she sailed from Malta to Toulon, a little before the island fell to the British.

Between 24 January 1801 and 3 February Justice sailed from Toulon to Alexandria in company with Égyptienne to resupply the French army there. Justice succeeded in evading the British blockade.

== Fate ==
She was in Alexandria when the British captured Alexandria on 2 September 1801. The British and their Ottoman allies agreed to a division of the spoils; the British received Egyptienne (50) and Régénérée (40), and the ex-Venetian frigate Léoben (26), and (ex-Venetian Medusa) (26), while Captain Pacha (sic) received Causse (ex-Venetian Vulcano) (64), Justice (46), Mantoue (ex-Venetian Cerere) (26), and the ex-Ottoman corvettes Halil Bey, Momgo Balerie, and Salâbetnümâ. Admiral Lord Keith commander of the naval forces, gave the value of Justice for prize money purposes at £17,095 2s 2d.
