= HMS Cyclops (1779) =

Enterprise-class Royal Navy frigate

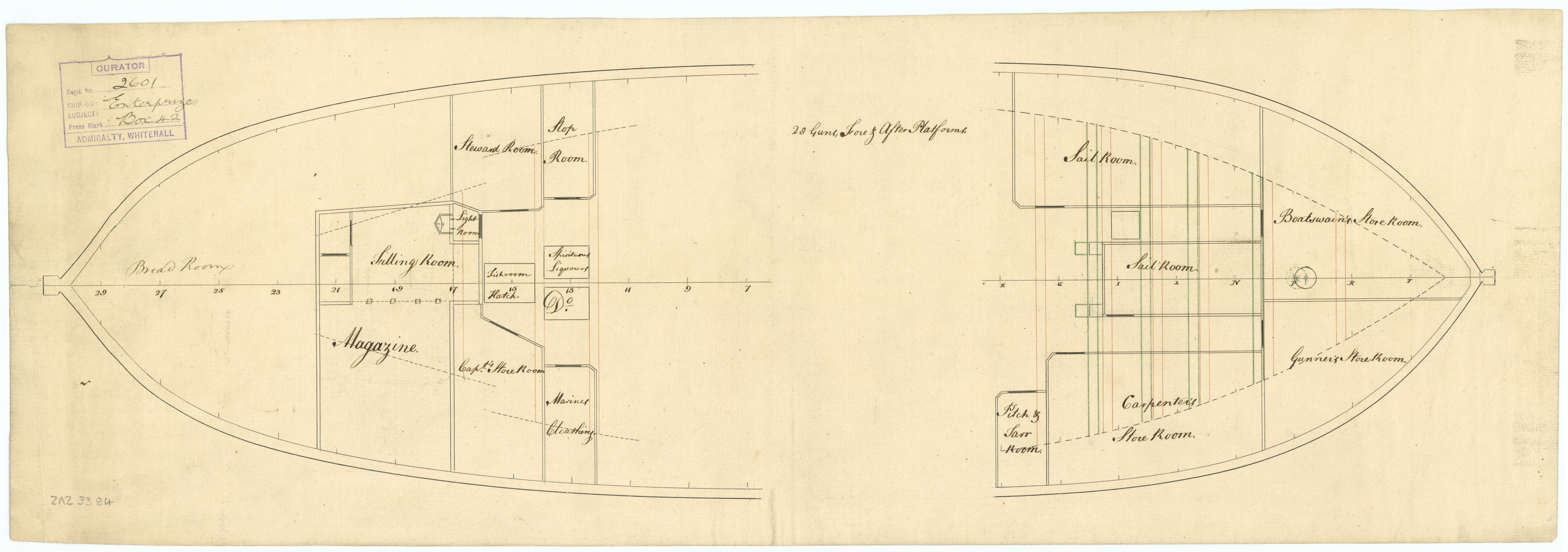
- Cyclops

History

Great Britain
- Name: HMS Cyclops
- Ordered: 6 March 1778
- Builder: James Menetone & Son, Limehouse
- Laid down: 3 April 1778
- Launched: 31 July 1779
- Completed: 26 September 1779 (at Deptford Dockyard)
- Commissioned: July 1779
- Honours and awards: Naval General Service Medal with clasp "Egypt"
- Fate: Sold for breaking up 1 September 1814

General characteristics
- Class & type: 28-gun Enterprise-class sixth-rate frigate
- Tons burthen: 602 80/94 (bm)
- Length: 120 ft 6 in (36.73 m) (overall); 99 ft 6 in (30.33 m) (keel)
- Beam: 33 ft 9 in (10.3 m)
- Depth of hold: 11 ft (3.4 m)
- Sail plan: Full-rigged ship
- Complement: 200 officers and men
- Armament: Upper deck: 24 × 9-pounder guns; QD: 4 × 6-pounder guns + 4 × 18-pounder carronades; Fc: 2 × 18-pounder carronades; Also:12 × swivel guns

HMS Cyclops was a 28-gun Enterprise-class sixth-rate frigate of the Royal Navy. The Cyclops was first commissioned in July 1779 under the command of Captain John Robinson.

In January 1783 she captured the French 14-gun brig Railleur on the North American station.

Because Cyclops served in the navy's Egyptian campaign between 8 March 1801 and 2 September, her officers and crew qualified for the clasp "Egypt" to the Naval General Service Medal, which the Admiralty authorised in 1850 to all surviving claimants. (Note: A first-class share of the prize money awarded in April 1823 was worth £34 2s 4d; a fifth-class share, that of a seaman, was worth 3s 11½d. The amount was small as the total had to be shared between 79 vessels and the entire army contingent.)
