= Action of 24 June 1795 =

Minor naval engagement during the French Revolutionary Wars

- Part of the French Revolutionary Wars
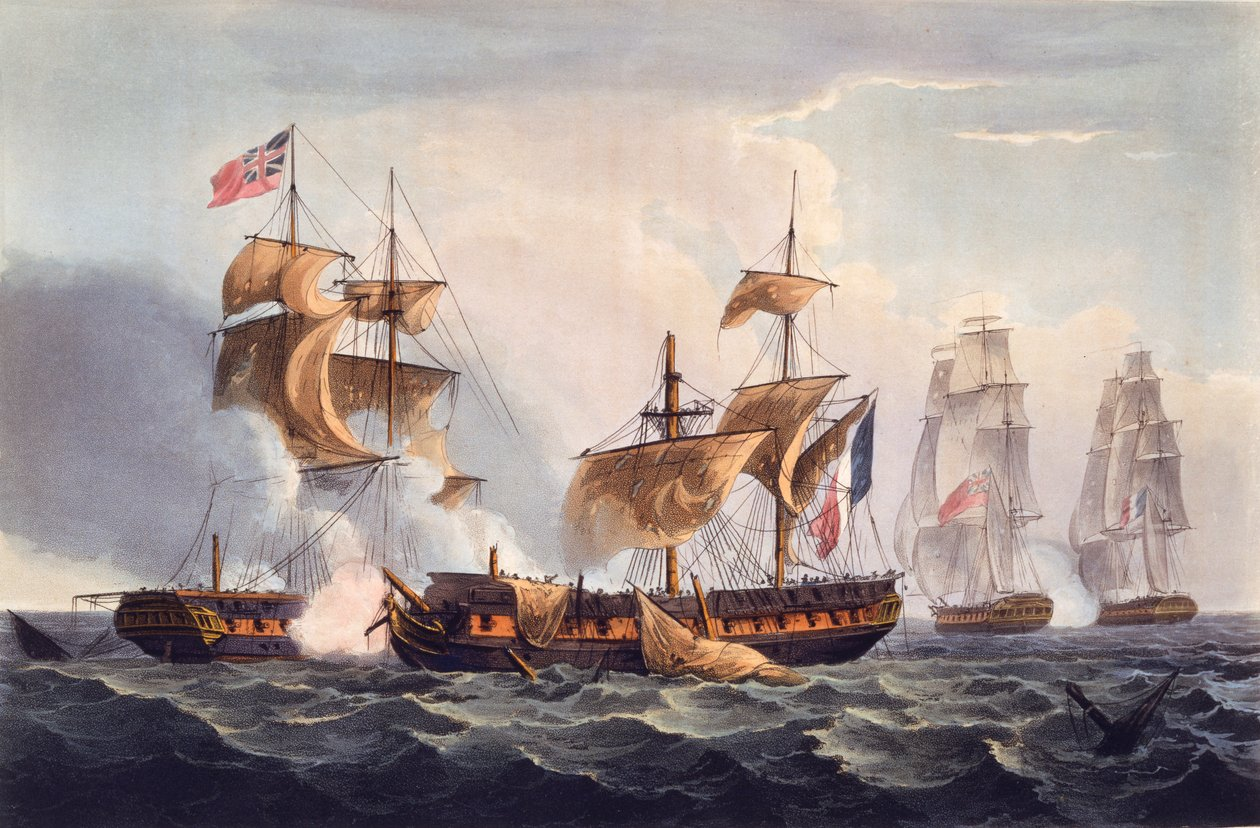
- Capture of La Minerve off Toulon, 24 June 1795; Thomas Whitcombe, 1817
Date	24 June 1795
Location	Off Toulon, Mediterranean Sea 41°08′N 05°30′E
Result	British victory

Belligerents
Great Britain	France

Commanders and leaders
George Towry	Jean-Baptiste Perrée

Strength
2 frigates	2 frigates

Casualties and losses
6 killed 16 wounded	30 killed and wounded 1 frigate captured

The action of 24 June 1795 was a minor naval engagement fought in the Western Basin of the Mediterranean Sea on 24 June 1795 during the French Revolutionary Wars. During 1795 the Royal Navy and French Navy Mediterranean Fleets were vying for supremacy in the region, the French operating from the fortified port of Toulon and the British from the allied Spanish base of Port Mahon on Menorca. A minor British victory at the Battle of Genoa in March had not resolved the conflict, both sides suffering damage. The British, under Admiral William Hotham, subsequently withdrew to Menorca to meet a squadron of reinforcements while the French, under Contre-amiral Pierre Martin at Toulon, suffering from ill-discipline, had also been reinforced. By June, both fleets were ready to return to the Ligurian Sea.

To scout their opponents, Hotham at Menorca and Martin at Toulon both sent out small frigate squadrons to determine whether the enemy fleets were at sea. Hotham sent the small frigates HMS Dido and HMS Lowestoffe and Martin the larger Minerve and Artémise. On 24 June, at almost the midpoint between the two naval bases, these scouting squadrons encountered one another. Although the French initially retreated, once it became clear that their opponents were noticeably smaller they wore round and attacked.

Under fire, Minerve attempted to ram Dido. Manoeuvering to avoid destruction, Captain George Henry Towry turned aside and instead found his rigging impaled on the French ship's bowsprit. After 15 minutes of hand-to-hand combat, the French bowsprit shattered under the strain. Dido too was left badly damaged, but the delay allowed Lowestoffe to come up and rake Minerve, causing such severe damage that the French ship was rendered unmanageable. On seeing his companion in this situation, Captain Charbonnier of Artémise, which had played an ineffectual part in the combat, withdrew, briefly and distantly pursued by Lowestoffe. Isolated and immobile, Minerve was then battered into surrender by Lowestoffe. The captured frigate was commissioned into the Royal Navy under the same name, and served until she was recaptured by the French at the action of 2 July 1803.

== Background ==
In the summer of 1795 the Mediterranean theatre of the French Revolutionary Wars was contested by significant fleets from the Royal Navy and French Navy. The French Mediterranean Fleet, based in the fortified port of Toulon had been badly damaged during the chaotic final days of the siege of Toulon in the autumn of 1793, and had required almost a year to repair and refit. The British Mediterranean Fleet, commanded from late 1794 by Vice-Admiral William Hotham, had maintained a blockade on the port, operating from the allied Spanish base at Port Mahon on Menorca and, more distantly, from Gibraltar. British efforts in 1794 were focused on capturing the island of Corsica through sieges at Bastia, Calvi and San Fiorenzo. After a determined resistance the last French stronghold on the island fell on 10 August.

In February 1795 the French Mediterranean Fleet was again in suitable condition for offensive operations, 15 ships of the line sailing for an attack on Corsica. Under Contre-amiral Pierre Martin, this fleet successfully captured the British 74-gun ship of the line HMS Berwick at the action of 8 March 1795, but was defeated by Hotham's fleet at the Battle of Genoa on 14 March, losing two ships and retreating to the French coast. In the aftermath of the battle the British fleet was hit by a storm off La Spezia and the 74-gun ship of the line HMS Illustrious was wrecked, Hotham gathering his surviving ships first at San Fiorenzo and then Leghorn, before sailing to Menorca in early June to meet with a large squadron of reinforcements from the Channel Fleet under Rear-Admiral Robert Mann. Meanwhile, Martin reconstituted his scattered force in the shelter of the Hyères Islands. In April he was joined by a large squadron of reinforcements from the French Atlantic Fleet, but any immediate operations were postponed by a strike action by the sailors of his fleet in May. Once this had been resolved, Martin put to sea once more on 7 June.

The location of the enemy was an urgent priority for both admirals, and each dispatched a small squadron of two frigates in search of the rival fleet. Hotham sent the small 28-gun 12-pounder HMS Dido under Captain George Henry Towry and the 32-gun HMS Lowestoffe under Captain Robert Gambier Middleton with instructions to scout Toulon and the Hyères Islands and determine whether Martin was still at anchor. Martin sent the larger 40-gun frigate Minerve under Captain Jean-Baptiste Perrée and the 36-gun Artémise under Captain Charbonnier with orders to search the seas around Menorca for Hotham's fleet.

== Action ==
At 04:00 on 24 June, at position 41°08′N 05°30′E, almost the midpoint between Menorca and Toulon, the frigate squadrons sighted one another. Dido, the leading British ship, sent coded signals to the French, who failed to answer, confirming their nationality. As the British advanced, the French tacked away, and rapidly outdistanced the British ships. At 08:00, however, with visibility improving, the diminutive size of the British ships became apparent and the French squadron turned back and bore down on Dido and Lowestoffe. At 08:30, Minerve was close enough to Dido to fire a broadside, although Towry elected not to return fire until Minerve had closed further. By 08:45 he had successfully manoeuvered into a position in front of Perrée's bow and fired at close range.

Seeing the smaller ship directly in front of him, the French captain spread all sail and threw Minerve forwards, attempting to ram Dido amidships. If the attack had been successful, Dido would likely have been crushed by the weight of the larger frigate, but Towry was able to respond by throwing the wheel hard to port and turning away from the blow. The frigates were so close that Minerve's bowsprit became tangled in the rigging of Dido's mizzenmast. The effect was to throw Dido hard against Minerve's starboard bow and lift the smaller ship almost out of the water, her weight suspended from Minerve's bowsprit. Covered by cannon fire from the forward 18-pounder long guns and heavy musketry, the French crew attempted to scramble along the bowsprit and onto Dido's deck, the boarding action prevented by sailors armed with pikes. The attack was dangerous, wave action causing the suspended Dido to slam repeatedly against the hull of Minerve, and at approximately 9:00 the bowsprit finally snapped under the strain, fatally plunging at least eight French sailors attempting to board Dido into the gap between the ships. It also dislodged Dido's mizzenmast, which collapsed.

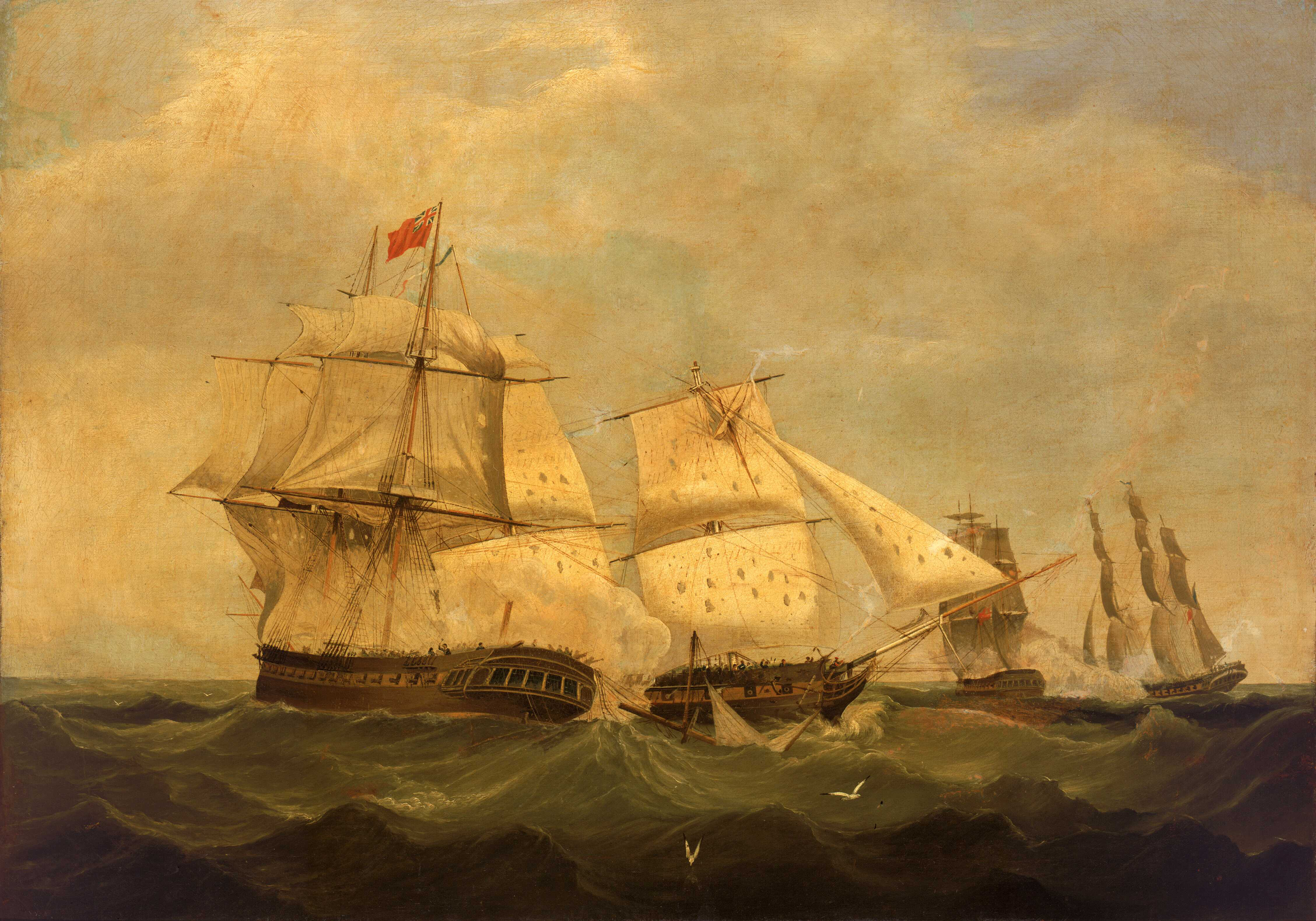
HMS 'Dido' and 'Lowestoft' in action with 'Minerve' and 'Artemise', 24 June 1795

As the crews cut their ships free of the wreckage Minerve and Dido scraped alongside one another, their cannon opening fire once more at point blank range. The greater height of the French ship conferred an unexpected advantage as its higher spars ripped Dido's topsails off her masts, allowing Minerve to pull away from the British ship. At this stage Lowestoffe, which had been hitherto prevented from joining the combat by the position of Dido, now arrived off Minerve's bow and opened fire from close range. In less than eight minutes this raking fire had brought the foremast and the main and mizzen topmasts crashing to the deck, rendering Minerve unable to manoeuvre. As this combat developed, Artémise had passed by at some distance, opening an ineffectual fire. Seeing that Minerve was badly damaged, Captain Charbonnier turned his ship and retreated northwards. Seeing the French ship withdraw, Towry ordered Middleton to pursue, Lowestoffe breaking off action with Minerve at 09:15 and chasing Artémise, which opened fire with its stern-chasers, damaging Lowestoffe's mizzenmast. Middleton replied with his own bow-chasers, but they had little effect and the faster Artémise soon pulled away from Lowestoffe. At 10:30 the chase was abandoned and Middleton returned to the isolated and battered Minerve.

Although he was now alone with no hope of escape, Perrée had not struck his colours. Middleton was, however, able to bring Lowestoffe close to Perrée's stern and resume his raking fire. At 11:45, with his mizzenmast smashed overboard and Dido slowly approaching, the French captain acknowledged the inevitable and hailed Middleton that he had surrendered. Artémise was still distantly in sight, but made no attempt to intervene in the final stage of the battle. British casualties amounted to six killed and 13 wounded on Dido and three wounded on Lowestoffe. Losses on Minerve were not accurately recorded, but were believed to be approximately 30 killed and wounded, including those who were killed after falling from the bowsprit into the gap between Dido and Lowestoffe. Casualties on Artémise were thought to be negligible.

=== Squadrons ===
In this table, "Guns" refers to all cannon on the ship, including the maindeck guns that formed the basis for calculating its rate, as well as any carronades the ship carried. "Broadside weight" refers to the total weight of shot which the ship could fire in a single simultaneous discharge of an entire broadside.

Ship	Commander	Navy	Guns	Tons (bm)	Broadside weight	Complement	Casualties		
Ship	Commander	Navy	Guns	Tons (bm)	Broadside weight	Complement	Killed	Wounded	Total
HMS Dido	Captain George Henry Towry	Royal Navy	32	595	156 pounds (71 kg)	193	6	13	19
HMS Lowestoffe	Captain Robert Gambier Middleton	Royal Navy	36	717	210 pounds (95 kg)	212	0	3	3
Minerve	Captain Jean-Baptiste Perrée	French Navy	42	1102	370 pounds (170 kg)	318	c.30		
Artémise	Captain Charbonnier	French Navy	40	600	283 pounds (128 kg)	c.300	negligible		

== Aftermath ==
The damage to Dido's masts necessitated abandoning the mission and retiring to Port Mahon with the captured Minerve. Information obtained from prisoners determined however that the French fleet had sailed from Toulon and were at sea. As soon as the squadron reached port on 27 June, Towry ordered the cutter HMS Fox to take a report to Hotham's fleet, which was anchored off the Tour de Mortella on Corsica. Hotham then sent Captain Horatio Nelson to scout for the French fleet off Genoa with ship of the line HMS Agamemnon and a small squadron. On 7 July he discovered Martin's force, and Agamemnon retreated back to Hotham's fleet with the French in pursuit. On 8 July Hotham sailed to meet them, and on 13 July the Battle of the Hyères Islands resulted in a minor British victory, with one French ship sunk, and Martin retired to Toulon. Although a squadron sailed for the Atlantic in September, the main Toulon fleet did not leave harbour again during the course of the year.

British historian William James calls the engagement "a gallantly fought action on the part of the British". He cites Towry's decision to attack Minerve with Dido as "noble in the extreme", pointing out that Minerve was almost twice the size of the British ship and carried more than 120 additional crew. James also considered that had Artémise participated fully in the engagement then Dido would certainly have been captured by the French squadron. On returning to Toulon, Captain Charbonnier faced a court-martial for his failure to support Perrée, but was ultimately acquitted.

Minerve was repaired at Port Mahon and then Ajaccio, subsequently commissioned into the Mediterranean Fleet under the same name with Towry in command. Minerve remained an active warship in the Royal Navy until she was recaptured by the French off Cherbourg-en-Cotentin at the action of 2 July 1803. In the aftermath of the engagement the first lieutenants of both British ships were promoted to commander, and more than five decades after the battle the Admiralty recognised the action with the clasps "DIDO 24 JUNE 1795" and "LOWESTOFFE 24 JUNE 1795" attached to the Naval General Service Medal, awarded upon application to all British participants still living in 1847.

== Bibliography ==
- Clowes, William Laird (1997) [1900]. The Royal Navy, A History from the Earliest Times to 1900, Volume IV. London: Chatham Publishing. ISBN 1-86176-013-2.
- Gardiner, Robert, ed. (2001) [1996]. Fleet Battle and Blockade. London: Caxton Editions. ISBN 978-1-84067-363-0.
- James, William (2002) [1827]. The Naval History of Great Britain, Volume 1, 1793–1796. London: Conway Maritime Press. ISBN 0-85177-905-0.
- James, William (2002) [1827]. The Naval History of Great Britain, Volume 3, 1800–1805. London: Conway Maritime Press. ISBN 0-85177-907-7.
