= Tarleton (disambiguation) =

Tarleton is a village in Lancashire, England.

Tarleton may also refer to:

- Tarleton, Tasmania, a rural and residential locality in Australia
- Tarleton Gillespie, communications researcher and author
- Tarleton Hoffman Bean (1846–1916), American ichthyologist
- Tarleton (surname), several people
- List of ships named Tarleton, several ships
- Tarleton State University, a public university in Stephenville, Texas
- Lake Tarleton, in New Hampshire

== See also ==
- Tarlton (disambiguation)
