= List of ships named Auspicious =

Several vessels have been named Auspicious:

- Auspicious (1797 ship) was launched at King's Lynn, was burnt in 1797 but rebuilt in 1801, made several voyages for the British East India Company, and was sold in 1821.
- Auspicious (1799 ship) was launched at Newcastle and was wrecked at Heneaga on 16 August 1801 in an incident in which strong currents at night claimed five other merchantmen and one of their escorts, HMS Lowestoffe.
