= Tarleton (1780 Glasgow ship) =

History

Great Britain
- Name: Tarleton
- Owner: Crosbie
- Launched: 1780 at Glasgow
- Fate: Captured 19 October 1782

France
- Name: Tarleton
- Acquired: 1782 by capture
- Fate: Captured by the British at Toulon, 29 December 1793

Great Britain
- Name: HMS Tarleton
- Acquired: by capture, December 1793
- Fate: Sold 1796

General characteristics
- Type: Brig-sloop
- Tons burthen: 130, or 140 (bm)
- Complement: 40-50
- Armament: Privateer:14 × 3-pounder guns + 6 swivel guns; French service:14 × 4-pounder guns; HMS:14 × 6-pounder guns

Tarleton was a 14-gun brig launched in 1780 at Glasgow. She was a letter of marque that made one capture. The French captured Tarleton in October 1782 in the Caribbean. They took her back to France in 1783 and she was subsequently stationed at Brest, where she served in the Mediterranean. The British recaptured her at Toulon in 1793 and she then served in the Mediterranean until no later than 1798 when she disappears from the lists.

== Origins ==
Tarleton's origins are uncertain. Though the name was unusual, it was not unique at the time. There were at least two Tarleton's in French hands in early 1783, with different commanders.

Supposedly the Tarleton of this article had been a vessel the Royal Navy had captured and lost to the French in 1782. However, there are no readily accessible Royal Navy records of any capture, service, or subsequent loss. There was a mercantile Tarlton [sic], of New York, with Young, owner, that escaped Yorktown shortly before its fall in 1781. The ambiguous report of "Jonas Rider, a Black Man", raises the possibility that the French captured this vessel, only to lose it to the British. If the French then recaptured it, it may have been the Tarleton that the Royal Navy reportedly captured and lost in 1782.

=== Tarleton (I) ===
The Archives of the State of Maryland record on 3 January 1783 that two armed vessels, Pole Cat and Tarleton, had arrived from Baltimore and sailed into Chesapeake Bay to drive out the British forces there. On 25 February there was a memo to Captan de Barrass, of Tarleton. On 19 March a second memo mentioned Captain de Barrass of the sloop Tarleton. Lastly, a memo on 19 May discusses the return to Tarleton of her sick that have recovered.

=== Tarleton (II) ===
In late 1782 Tarleton, Captain Lecamus, was at Saint Domingue when the governor sent her to Boston. On 3 January 1783, the French brig Tarleton, of 14 guns, and under the command of lieutenant de vaisseau le Camus, encountered an 18-gun brig that escaped Tarleton only by its superior sailing. Tarleton forced the enemy brig to abandon a Spanish prize that it had taken. Tarleton suffered one man wounded in the engagement. The mention does not make clear where this occurred, but a second mention is more specific.

On 9 February, Tarleton was leaving Port-au-Prince, having returned there for repairs. As she left to resume her voyage to Boston, she encountered a British frigate and a brig. M. de Camus sailed Tarleton into a cove. There he found two guns that he combined with four of his own to form a shore battery. With this he forced the English vessels to sail off. Eventually she did reach Boston.

The issue then is, if one Tarleton was in the Chesapeake between January and May 1783, which was the Tarleton that was at Saint-Domingue in January–February 1783? The most likely candidate is Tarleton, launched in 1780 at Glasgow.

She was of 140 tons (bm), was armed with fourteen 3-pounder guns, and her owner was Crosbie. As a privateer under the command of A. Taylor she captured the American vessel Tom Lee, Buchanan, master, on 23 March 1781 after an engagement of two and a half hours during which Tom Lee suffered one man killed; Tarleton had no casualties. Tom Lee had been sailing from Baltimore to Nantes with 140 hogsheads of tobacco valued at £9000. Tom Lee was armed with 12 guns and had a crew of 45 men. Shortly after this M. Reed became master and her trade became Liverpool-Barbados. She made a voyage to Saint Lucia and return but on 19 October 1782 the French captured her and took her into Cap François. Her captor was apparently Aigrette.

Her entry in the 1783 volume of Lloyd's Register carried the annotation "Taken".

The remaining question then is, which of the two Tarletons is the one that the French navy took back to France?

== French service ==
When Tarleton reached Boston, she arrived too late to meet with the troops of Louis-Philippe de Vaudreuil, Lieutenant General of the Naval Armies, or even to meet them at sea. The force of 4000 men under General Rochembeau had left Boston on 20 December, bound for the Gulf.

On 29 April 1783 enseigne de vaisseau Aristide-Aubert du Petit-Thouars took command of Tarleton, which he described as a brig of fourteen 4-pounder guns. He exchanged with de Camus, who transferred to the 32-gun frigate Amazone. Tarleton and Amazone then escorted a convoy from Saint-Domingue to Brest, France. On his arrival, Petit-Thouars suggested that he be given command of Tarleton for a voyage of exploration. However, the navy paid-off Tarleton at Brest. Later, in 1784, the navy transferred her to the Mediterranean Fleet at Toulon.

Between 1784 and 1788, Tarleton was under the command of Capitaine de fregate Comte Laurent-Jean-François Truguet. She carried the French ambassador Choiseul-Gouffier, and his suite, to his post at Constantinople. She then sailed around the Bosphorus, Marmara, and the whole of the Middle East. Truguet mapped the coasts of the Ottoman Empire and took Choiseul-Gouffier on an exploration of what was believed to be the area where Troy had stood. While in command of Tarleton, Truguet wrote a monograph on tactics and another on naval maneuvers; these were translated into Turkish and printed at Constantinople.

In 1790 or so, Tarleton was under the command of Sous-lieutenant de vaisseaux Féraud. He sailed her from Toulon to Milo, Sicily, via Tunis and Malta. Then she escorted French merchant vessels sailing from Smyrna to Cerigo.

Tarleton then reappears at the siege of Toulon, under the command of "Maselet". There Royalist forces turned over to the Anglo-Spanish force the French naval vessels in the port. Royalist Lieutenant de vaisseau Louis-Joseph-Felix-Nöel Damblard de Lansmatre then commanded her in October as part of a small squadron that patrolled the Îles d'Hyères to suppress piracy. When the Anglo-Spanish force had to leave in December, they took with them the best vessels, including Tarleton (or Tarleston), and tried to burn the remainder. (Note: Tarleton, under Damblar, was listed on 19 December as part of Rear Admiral Trogoff's squadron. Although the item in the Naval Chronicle lists the then (1799) disposition of most of the vessels of this squadron, it does not mention Tarleton, which is unsurprising as by then she had been sold.)

== British service ==
After the Siege of Bastia had ended in May 1794, Admiral Lord Hood, sought out a French squadron consisting of seven ships of the line and some frigates. Hood sighted them on 10 June and drove them into Gourjean Bay. (Note: Gourjean, or Jouan, is the bay east of Île Sainte-Marguerite.) The Weather prevented a conventional attack and Lieutenant Charles Brisbane of Britannia, proposed a fire ship attack. Hood accepted the plan and the British converted Tarleton into a fireship under Brisbane's command. However, on the eve of the attack, the French sortied, forcing Hood to abandon the plan and to retire.

Hood nevertheless promoted Brisbane to commander on 1 July and to command of Tarleton. He served in her during the remainder of that year and part of the next in the squadron acting in the Gulf of Genoa, under the immediate orders of Nelson.

Brisbane and Tarleton spent some time blockading Gourjean Bay, and then protecting the trade between Bastia and Leghorn.

On the morning of 9 March 1795, Admiral Hotham put to sea heading for Corsica in search of the French fleet. As yet unaware of the fate of Berwick, he sent Tarleton ahead to San Fiorenzo to order Berwick to join him off Cap Corse. Tarleton reported back to the fleet that night, giving Hotham news of Berwick's capture, and presumably an updated location of the French fleet, as Hotham changed his course, heading north-west. The following morning on 10 March the British came in sight of the French fleet, now beating northwards back to Toulon against a south-west wind.

At the subsequent battle of Genoa (14 March 1795), Tarleton was in the seaboard or weather division under Vice-Admiral Samuel Goodall. After the battle, Meleager was towing Illustrious when she broke free of her tow. Then the accidental firing of a lower deck gun damaged the ship so that she took on water. Illustrious attempted to anchor in Valence Bay (between Spezia and Leghorn) to ride out the bad weather that had descended upon her. Her cables broke, however, and she struck on rocks and had to be abandoned. Lowestoffe and Tarleton took off her stores, and all her crew were saved.

Shortly thereafter, Brisbane removed to the sloop Moselle.

Captain Robert Redmill took command of Tarleton in July 1796. Redmill remained in command only a short time before transferring to another vessel. In September Lieutenant William Proby replaced Redmill. By this time Tarleton was in a wretched state, leaky and rotten. In December Admiral Jervis observed that she was "in extreme danger" of sinking even while undertaking a short voyage between two Mediterranean ports.

== Fate ==
On 21 October 1796 Captain Nelson wrote to Admiral Jervis that he, Nelson, was sending Tarleton to Jervis so that, as Jervis wanted, he could transfer Proby to Téméraire. (Note: Téméraire was a cutter or xebec that HMS Dido captured in 1795 in the Mediterranean. The French navy had commissioned her in October 1793 as the 6-gun Révolutionaire and renamed her in 1794. She was broken up in 1803.) Nelson wrote on 29 December that he expected to be able to sell Tarleton and Mignonne. However, on 2 December Jervis wrote from Gibraltar to Lord Spencer, First Lord of the Admiralty, that he, Jervis, intended to transfer Proby to Peterell, and that Tarleton had been sold. The British ended up burning Mignonne in 1797.
