= Temeraire =

Temeraire or Téméraire (French for "reckless") may refer to:

- HMS Temeraire, several ships of the Royal Navy
- French ship Téméraire, several ships of the French Navy
- Téméraire-class ship of the line, a class of ships designed and built for the French Navy
- The Fighting Temeraire, a painting by J. M. W. Turner
- Temeraire (series), a series of alternate history/fantasy novels by Naomi Novik
  - His Majesty's Dragon, released as Temeraire in the UK, the first novel in the series
