= French ship Révolutionnaire =

Five ships of the French Navy have borne the name Révolutionnaire ("Revolutionary"):

- French ship Révolutionnaire (1793) was a xebec commissioned in 1793 and renamed Téméraire. The British Royal Navy captured her in 1795 in the Mediterranean and she served there as HMS Temeraire and then HMS Transfer until she was broken up in 1803.
- French corvette Révolutionnaire (1793), a 20-gun Jean Bart-class corvette (See HMS Arab), launched in 1793, that the Royal Navy captured in December, that the French recaptured in 1794 and renamed Reprise in 1795, and that was broken up in 1797.
- French felucca Révolutionnaire (1793), a felucca (1793–1794)
- Bretagne, a 110-gun ship of the line, was renamed Révolutionnaire in 1793.
- French frigate Révolutionnaire (1794), a 40-gun Seine-class frigate taken by the Royal Navy.
