= French ship Le Téméraire =

Numerous French vessels have borne the name Téméraire ([te.me.ʁɛʁ]; "bold" or "reckless"). Note that several British ships have had the same name (although without the accents over the letter "e"), see HMS Temeraire.

== Naval vessels ==
Twelve ships of the French Navy

- French ship Téméraire (1671), a 54-gun ship of the line (1669–1694).
- French ship Téméraire (1695), a 50-gun ship of the line (1695–1718).
- French ship Téméraire (1726), a West Indiaman (1726–1737).
- French ship Téméraire (1749), a 74-gun ship of the line (1748–1794). She was captured by the English HMS Warspite at the Battle of Lagos on the 19 August 1759, and became HMS Temeraire.
- French cutter Téméraire (1780), a cutter (1780–1784).
- French ship Téméraire (1782), a ship of the line (1782–1801), lead ship of the Téméraire class. She took part in the bataille du 13 prairial an 2.
- French cutter Téméraire (1795), a cutter launched as Révolutionnaire and renamed in 1795. Captured by HMS Dido on 13 April 1795. Recaptured the next month.
- Téméraire, a xebec. HMS Dido captured her on 9 July 1795 and the British Royal Navy took her into service as HMS Transfer. She was sold in 1803.
- French torpedo boat Téméraire (1889), a torpedo boat (1889–1911).
- French destroyer Téméraire, a torpedo boat (1911–1936), built for Argentina as San Juan, requisitioned for the war and renamed to Téméraire in 1914.
- French torpedo boat Téméraire (1944), a torpedo boat (1944), sunk in a bombing in Toulon in August 1944.
- French submarine Le Téméraire (S617), the second submarine of the Triomphant class, presently in active service.

== Privateers ==
- Téméraire was a privateer of 10 guns and 50 men under the command of lieutenant de frégate Le Fer that HMS Cormorant captured on 30 July 1782 off Cape Clear. She was nine days out of Brest, France, with dispatches for the combined fleet that she threw overboard, together with eight guns, before her capture.
- French ship Téméraire (1803), a privateer aviso (1803–1811).
- French ship Téméraire (1809), a privateer of two guns and 30 men that HMS Hind captured on 29 September 1809 off Melazzo. She was four days out of Naples and had not made any captures.
- French ship Téméraire (1810), a privateer schooner of 10 guns, six large swivel guns, and a crew of 35 men. She was a new vessel, three days out of Brest, and had taken no prizes when HMS Fawn captured her on 11 October 1810.
- French ship Téméraire (1812), a privateer in 1812.

== See also ==
- HMS Temeraire
