= Auspicious (1799 ship) =

Great Britain
- Name: Auspicious
- Owner: J. Lyall
- Builder: William Rowe, St Peter's, Newcastle-upon-Tyne
- Launched: 1799
- Fate: Wrecked 10 August 1801

General characteristics
- Tons burthen: 463, or 465 (bm)
- Armament: 10 × 6-pounder + 2 × 12-pounder guns + 2 × 18-pounder carronades

Auspicious was launched at Newcastle in 1799 and was wrecked at Heneaga on 16 August 1801. She was part of a convoy sailing from Jamaica to England when strong, unsuspected currents drove her, five other merchantman, and one of their escorts, the frigate HMS Lowestoffe on to the shore.

Auspicious entered Lloyd's Register in 1799 with Stranach, master, J. Lyall, owner, and trade London transport. In 1801 Auspicious was under the command of J. Proctor and sailing to Jamaica, that is, as a West Indiaman.

== Loss ==
In July 1801 Auspicious was part of a convoy sailing back from the West Indies to England. The convoy assembled off Port Antonio and got under way on 27 July. The escorts consisted of HMS Lowestoffe, Acasta, the sloop Bonetta, and the schooners Musquito (or Muskito), and Sting.

On 8 August, the convoy was off Môle-Saint-Nicolas and set off for the Caicos Passage. Two days later they sighted Great Inagua. That night a strong current was noted on Lowestoffe. Despite efforts to steer her taking the current into account and dropping her anchors to keep her from grounding, she struck. Her crew cut away masts and threw guns overboard, but the inflow of water overwhelmed the pumps. Her crew took to her boats and landed on the shore. Daybreak revealed that Lowestoffe had been wrecked on Heneaga, and that several merchantmen too had been wrecked. Five men on Lowestoffe were lost when a boat capsized in the surf.

None of the merchantmen suffered any fatalities. The merchantmen that were wrecked were:

Vessel	Year launched	Burthen	Master	Owner	Place launched
Auspicious	1799	463	Proctor	Lyall	Newcastle
Bushy Park	1792	371	Brown	Milligan	River Thames
Fanny			Melville		
Jason	1799	406	W. Watt	Hibbert	River Thames
Milton	1800	407	Robley, or J. Robby	Boltons	Hull
Swansea	1798	345	Warden	Cox & Co.	Yarmouth

In the late afternoon of 11 August, Acasta left Bonetta and three of her own boats to help the wrecked vessels and then took command of the convoy. Bonetta took the survivors back to Jamaica.

The subsequent court-martial at Port Royal on 3 September, ruled that a sudden change in the current after dark had caused the loss. The board acknowledged that Captain Pamplin of Lowestoffe had sailed in a judicious manner and exonerated him and his officers from blame both for the loss of Lowestoffe and the vessels in convoy.
