= George Towry =

Captain George Towry
- Born: 4 March 1767
- Died: 9 April 1809 (aged 42); Somerset Place, London
- Military career
- Allegiance: United Kingdom
- Branch: Royal Navy
- Service years: 1780–1809
- Conflicts: American Revolutionary War; Great Siege of Gibraltar; French Revolutionary Wars; Action of 24 June 1795; Battle of Cape St Vincent; Napoleonic Wars

Captain George Henry Towry (4 March 1767 – 9 April 1809) was a Royal Navy officer of the late eighteenth and early nineteenth century who is best known for his service as commander of the frigate HMS Dido, in the action of 24 June 1795 in the Western Mediterranean Sea during the French Revolutionary Wars, when, in company with HMS Lowestoffe he successfully fought and defeated the French frigates Minerve and Artémise, capturing Minerve and driving off Artémise. He later commanded HMS Diadem at the Battle of Cape St Vincent in 1797 and served during the Napoleonic Wars on the Transportation Board.

== Life ==
Towry was born in March 1767, educated at Eton College and joined the Royal Navy at 13 under the patronage of Lord Longford. He served during the American Revolutionary War aboard HMS Alexander and participated in the relief of the Great Siege of Gibraltar in 1782. Following the end of the war he continued in service under the Duke of Clarence and at the outbreak of the French Revolutionary Wars he was attached to the Mediterranean Fleet under the patronage of Lord Hood. He was rapidly promoted and by 1794 was a post captain in command of the small 28-gun frigate HMS Dido. Dido was the only ship of the Mediterranean Fleet to exchange fire with French ships during Martin's cruise of 1794, but was unable to prevent the French escaping into Gourjean Bay.

In June 1795, Dido was ordered, with HMS Lowestoffe, to detach from the fleet off Menorca and search for the French Mediterranean Fleet near Toulon. On 24 June 1795, at roughly the midpoint between Menorca and Toulon, Towry encountered a French squadron of two frigates on an identical mission from the French commander Contre-amiral Pierre Martin. The squadrons engaged, Dido narrowly avoiding being crushed during a ramming attempt by Minerve and becoming entangled in the French ship's rigging. Driving off boarding attempts, Dido snapped off the French bowsprit and together with Lowestoffe then battered Minerve into surrender. the other French ship, Artémise, played little part in the engagement and was easily driven off. Towry brought his prize back to the British fleet, where it was recommissioned as a Royal Navy frigate with the same name and Towry placed in command.

In 1796, Towry was given command of the 64-gun ship of the line HMS Diadem and in February 1797 commanded her at the Battle of Cape St Vincent where the Spanish Fleet was defeated. Shortly afterwards Diadem returned to Britain and Towry took command of HMS Uranie and HMS Cambrian before the Peace of Amiens in 1802.

At the outbreak of the Napoleonic Wars Towry was given command of HMS Tribune, but after a winter patrol he became ill and was forced to withdraw from active service. He was given a sinecure on the Transport Board and continued in this position until its dissolution. In 1802 he married a Miss Chamberlayne and had a marriage noted for its "greatest harmony and most perfect happiness" until her untimely death in 1806 which left him grief-stricken. They had three children, two of whom survived infancy. Towry died of natural causes at his father's house in April 1809 and was buried at St Marylebone Parish Church.
