= HMS Temeraire =

Six ships and two shore establishments of the Royal Navy have been called HMS Temeraire. The name entered the navy with the capture of the first Temeraire (French for "the daring one") from the French in 1759:

- HMS Temeraire (1759) was a 74-gun third-rate ship of the line captured from the French after the Battle of Lagos on 19 August 1759 and sold in 1784.
- HMS Temeraire was a cutter or xebec that HMS Dido captured in 1795 in the Mediterranean. The French Navy had commissioned her in October 1793 as the 6-gun Révolutionaire and renamed her Téméraire in 1794. She served under this name until being broken up in 1803.
- HMS Temeraire (1798) was a 98-gun second rate launched in 1798. She fought in the Battle of Trafalgar and was later used as a prison ship and then a receiving ship, and was broken up in 1838, recorded in The Fighting Temeraire Tugged To Her Last Berth To Be Broken Up by J.M.W. Turner.
- HMS Temeraire (1876) was an iron-hulled screw-propelled ship launched in 1876. She carried two disappearing guns on board. She became a training ship and was renamed Indus II in 1904, Akbar in 1915, and was sold in 1921.
- HMS Temeraire (1907) was a Bellerophon-class battleship launched in 1907 and sold in 1921.
- HMS Temeraire (1939) was to have been a Lion-class battleship. She was laid down in 1939 but construction was suspended later that year, and she was cancelled in 1944.
- HMS Temeraire was the Upper Yardmen training establishment at Port Edgar, South Queensferry, Scotland between 1955 and 1960.
- HMS Temeraire is the Directorate of Naval Physical Training and Sport (DNPTS) in Portsmouth. It was established in 1910 and commissioned as HMS Temeraire in 1971.

== See also ==
- French ship Le Téméraire
