= Robert Gambier Middleton =

Royal Navy officer (1774–1837)

Captain Robert Gambier Middleton
- Born: November 1774
- Died: 21 August 1837 (aged 62); Limpsfield, Surry, England
- Spouse: Susan Leake (m. 1802–1837)
- Military career
- Allegiance: United Kingdom
- Branch: Royal Navy
- Service years: c.1793–1832
- Rank: Captain
- Commands: HMS Lowestoffe; HMS Flora; North Foreland Sea Fencibles; Gibraltar Dockyard
- Conflicts: French Revolutionary Wars; Siege of Toulon; Action of 24 June 1795; Egypt Campaign; Battle of Abukir; Napoleonic Wars

Captain Robert Gambier Middleton (November 1774 – 21 August 1837) was an officer in the Royal Navy who distinguished himself in the Napoleonic Wars.

== Early life ==
Robert Gambier Middleton was the son of George Middleton, Collector of the Customs in Leith, and Elizabeth Wilson, daughter of George Wilson N.B. Esq, of Stottencleugh. He was adopted at an early age by his uncle Charles Middleton and aunt Margaret Middleton, née Gambier. Following a career of active naval service, his uncle, Charles Middleton, became Comptroller of the Navy in 1776 and went on to be First Naval Lord and then First Lord of the Admiralty.

== Naval career ==
Middleton served as a lieutenant on HMS Britannia in Lord Hood's fleet at the occupation and evacuation of Toulon in 1793. (Note: In the Royal Naval Biography entry, Footnote 1, the accuracy of this is open to question as records did not include first names.) He served as a second lieutenant on HMS Aquilon in 1793 and commander and commanding officer on HMS Eclair in 1794 On 11 August 1794 he obtained the rank of post-captain, commanding HMS Ariadne.

In June 1795, Middleton took command of HMS Lowestoffe and took part in the Action of 24 June 1795.

In October of the same year, he took command of HMS Flora and on 10 July 1796 the ship was involved in the occupation of Portoferraio by British troops. During his command, Flora was involved in capturing many enemy privateers and merchantmen. In the case of the French brig Le Mondovi, which had sought shelter in the harbour of Cerigo this involved sending boats into the harbour to cut her out, an operation which succeeded despite heavy fire from two batteries at the harbour entrance.

On the 8 March 1801, Flora took part in the landing of British troops led by Sir Ralph Abercromby in Aboukir Bay, during which several members of her crew were killed and wounded. In the subsequent Battle of Alexandria Abercromby suffered a wound which proved to be fatal. His body was carried to Malta on board Flora, where it was buried on St John's Bastion within Fort Saint Elmo. The Flora returned to England in the course of the following month, and in May he relinquished command of the ship.

In 1803, on the resumption of hostilities, there was a threat of invasion. He was put in command of the Sea Fencibles on the North Foreland district, and in 1805, after his uncle had been promoted to First Lord of the Admiralty, he became Dockyard Commissioner in Gibraltar. During the time when he was in Gibraltar, in the aftermath of the Battle of Trafalgar, his wife, who accompanied him, wrote a total of 55 letters to her sister, which provide an insight into her life there. In 1808 he obtained a seat on the Navy Board, where he remained until it was consolidated with the Admiralty in 1832, at which time he held the office of Storekeeper General. He then went on the list of retired Rear Admirals.

== Family ==
On 11 December 1802, Robert Gambier Middleton married Susan Maria Leake, daughter of John Martin Leake of Thorpe Hall and Mary Calvert, at Marleybone Church in Essex. Susan was a younger sister of William Martin Leake. Robert and Susan had ten or twelve children, with 7 known to have survived infancy. He died in Moorhouse, Limpsfield on 21 August 1837.
