= French frigate Artémise (1794) =

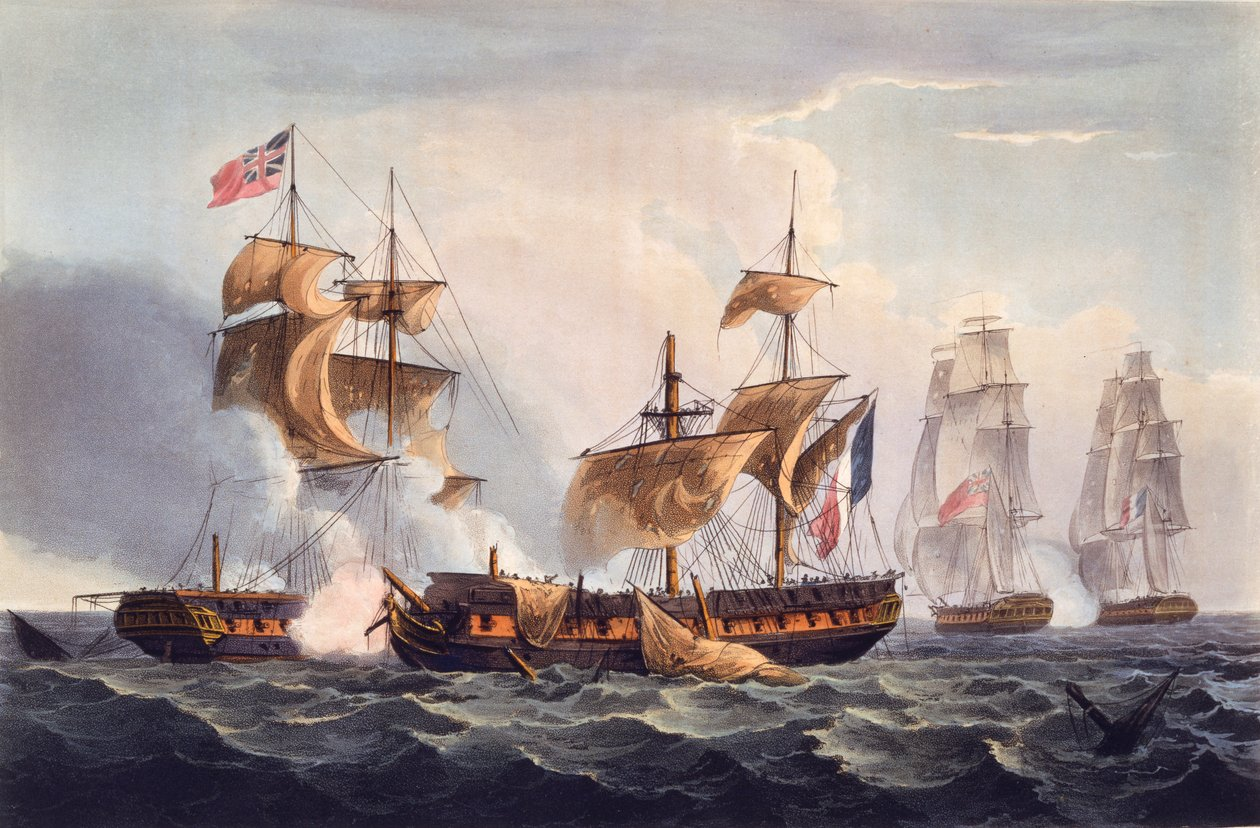
- Artémise (first from right) at the action of 24 June 1795

History

France
- Name: Artémise
- Namesake: Artemisia I of Caria/Artemis
- Builder: Toulon
- Laid down: December 1791
- Launched: 25 September 1794
- In service: November 1794
- Fate: Scuttled on 2 August 1798 after the Battle of the Nile to avoid capture

General characteristics
- Class & type: Magicienne-class frigate
- Displacement: 1,100 tonneaux
- Tons burthen: 600 port tonneaux
- Length: 44.18 m (144.9 ft) (overall); 38.66 m (126.8 ft) (keel)
- Beam: 11.21 m (36.8 ft)
- Draught: 5.2 m (17 ft) (laden)
- Complement: 265-285
- Armament: UD:26 × 12-pounder long guns; Spar deck:6 × 6-pounder long guns (by 1798, 4 more added); Also: 2 × 36-pounder obusiers (by 1798, 2 more added~)

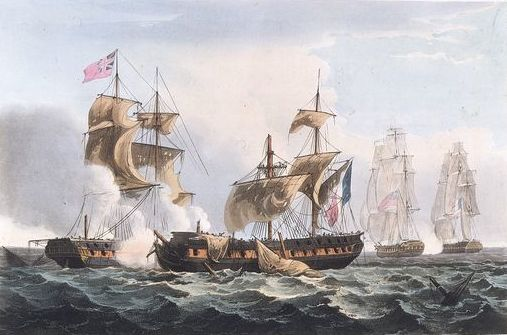
Capture of La Minerve off Toulon, 24 June 1795 by Thomas Whitcombe. In the foreground the damaged and dismasted Minerve duels with HMS Dido, while in the background far left Artémise flees, pursued by Lowestoffe

Artémise was a 32-gun Magicienne-class frigate of the French Navy.

She was under construction in Toulon when the Coalition seized the city in August 1793. They evacuated the city in December 1793, leaving her behind. The French named her Aurore on 24 July 1794, but then renamed her Artémise when they launched her on 25 September.

At the action of 24 June 1795, along with the 40-gun Minerve, she took part in an action against HMS Dido and Lowestoffe, escaping while Minerve was captured. Her captain was court-martialled for leaving Minerve but kept his command.

In 1798, she took part in the Expedition of Egypt. During the Battle of the Nile on 2 August 1798 HMS Orion and HMS Theseus engaged her; outgunned, her crew set fire to her to prevent the British from capturing her.
