= HMS Bonetta (1798) =

Sloop of the Royal Navy

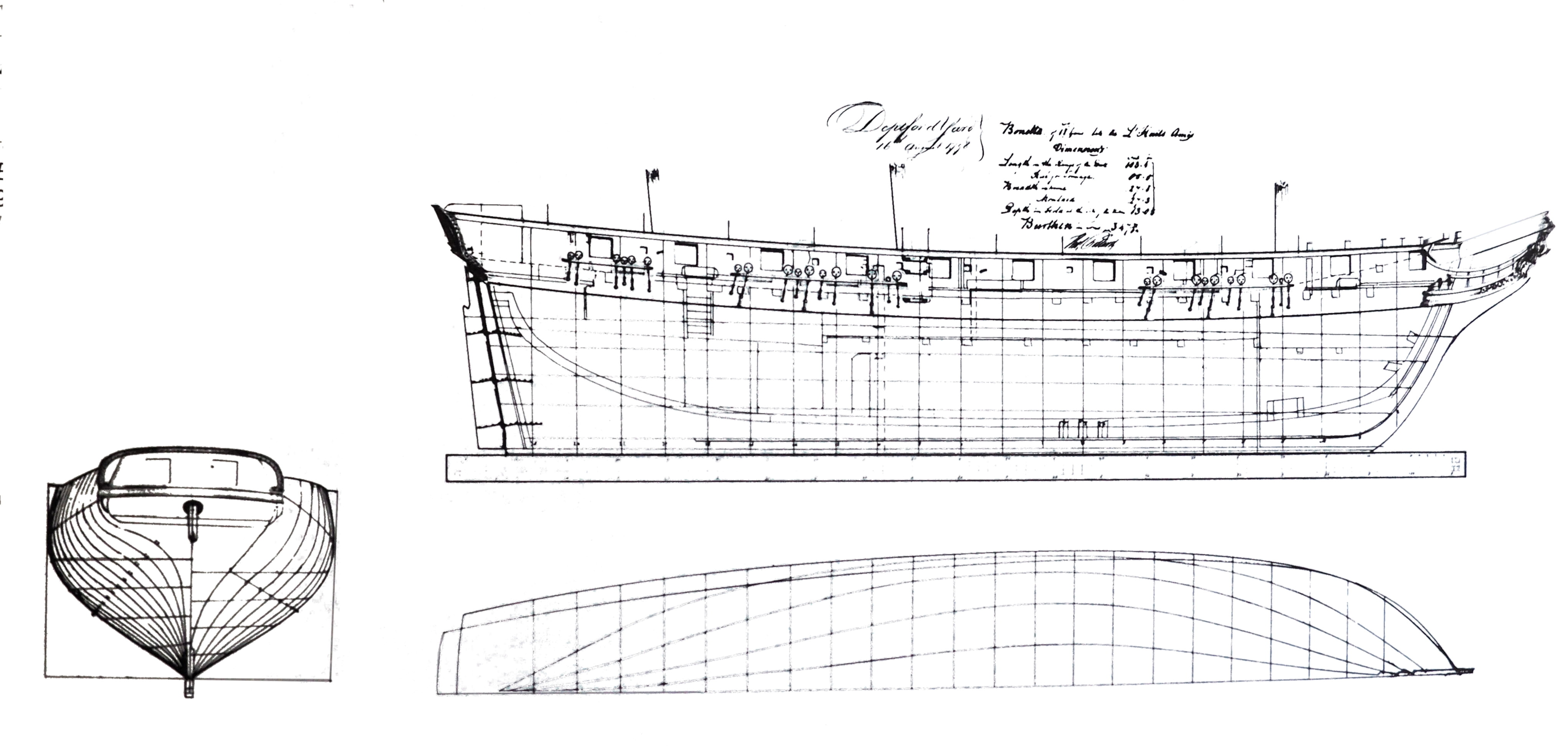
- Plans and elevation of Huit Amis as recorded in British sources after her capture

History

France
- Name: Huit Amis
- Namesake: "Eight friends"
- Builder: Bordeaux
- Launched: 1798
- Captured: 10 May 1798

Great Britain
- Name: HMS Bonetta
- Namesake: Atlantic bonito
- Acquired: May 1798 by capture
- Commissioned: August 1798
- Fate: Wrecked 25 October 1801

General characteristics
- Tons burthen: 34770/94 (bm)
- Length: Overall:103 ft 1 in (31.4 m); Keel:85 ft 5 in (26.0 m)
- Beam: 27 ft 8 in (8.4 m)
- Depth of hold: 13 ft 0 1/2 in (4.0 m)
- Complement: Privateer: 160; Royal Navy: 121
- Armament: Privateer: 18 × 6–pounder guns + two smaller guns; Royal Navy:18 × 6-pounder guns

HMS Bonetta was the French privateer Huit Amis, launched at Bordeaux in 1798 that the British Royal Navy captured in May. In her brief naval career she captured a number of small prizes, one of them a 2-gun privateer. Bonetta was wrecked in 1801.

== French service and capture ==
Huit Amis was purpose-built for privateering, quite new, and on her first cruise when HMS Endymion captured her on 10 May 1798 on the Irish Station. Huit Amis was provisioned for a four-month cruise, had been out 20 days, but had taken nothing. Her commander was Bernard Benquey.

== Royal Navy ==
Huit Amis arrived at Deptford on 11 July 1798 and was registered and taken into the Navy on that day. Commander Henry Vansittart commissioned her in August while she was undergoing fitting.

Bonetta sailed for Newfoundland on 8 June 1799. Then on 10 October Bonetta sailed from Portsmouth with a convoy for Newfoundland. From there she was to sail to Halifax, Nova Scotia with horses for His Royal Highness the Duke of Kent.

She sailed via Portugal and in early January 1800 a report arrived that the fleet had tried to get over the bar at Oporto but that only two vessels of the convoy had been able to do so due to the severity of the surf. Bonetta and the rest of the convoy had been beating to and fro off the port for 52 days. Three Portuguese Brazilmen had stuck on the bar and had been beaten to pieces.

Bonetta sailed for Jamaica in April 1800.

At some point in the first half of 1800 Bonetta recaptured the American schooner Fame, of Charlestown. She was carrying flour, soap, candles, and claret. Bonetta also detained the American schooner Maria, belonging to Kingston. She was sailing from the Bay of Honduras.

In June Bonetta destroyed the Spanish felucca Del Carmen. Del Carmen was armed with two 4-pounder guns and had a crew of 30 men.

At around the same time Bonetta captured a number of small merchant vessels:

- Danish schooner Friendship of 80 tons, carrying provisions and dry goods;
- Danish schooner Liberty, of 100 tons, carrying provisions and dry goods;
- Spanish polacca San Josef, of 100 tons, carrying cocoa;
- Spanish xebec Del Carmen, of 20 tons, in ballast;
- Spanish schooner Conception, in ballast;
- Spanish schooner Doncella, in ballast; and,
- American schooner Betsey, of 110 Tons, carrying provisions.

On 13 February 1801 Vansittart was promoted to post captain and command of HMS Abergavenny, stationed at Port Royal, though he may not have taken command until November. In June Commander J.Managhan replaced Vansittart, only to be replaced by Commander Thomas New.

Lowestoffe sailed from Kingston, Jamaica on 22 July 1801, and met a convoy five days later at Port Antonio. The escorts consisted of Lowestoffe, Acasta, Bonetta, and the schooners Musquito (or Muskito), and Sting. On 10 August Lowestoffe ran broadside onto Little Inagua (“Heneaga”) Island. The change in currents that caused Lowestoffe to wreck also caused the wreck of five, or six merchantmen. In the late afternoon of 11 August Acasta left Bonetta and three of her own boats to help the wrecked vessels and then took command of the convoy.

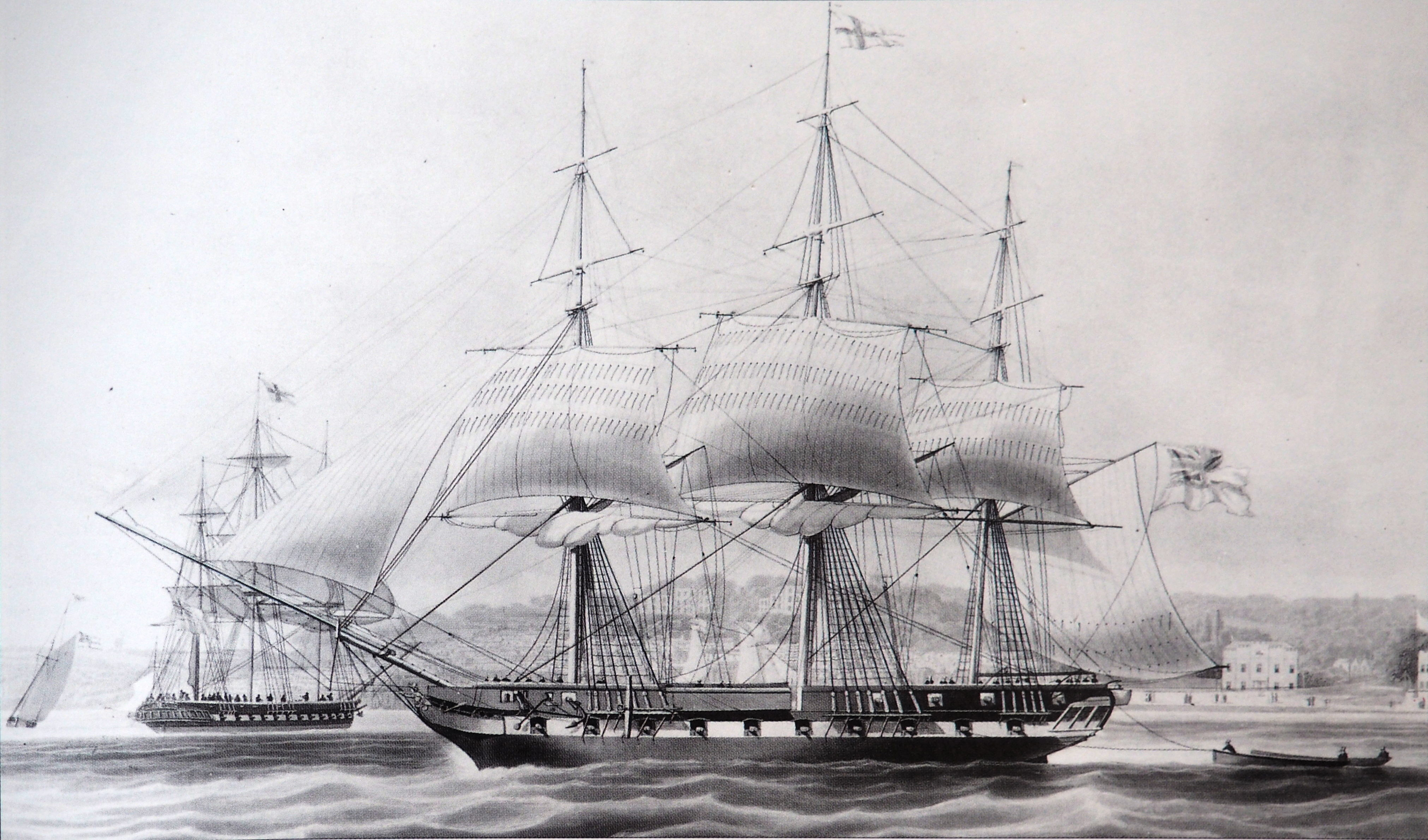
RYS Falcon (1824), design inspired by Huit Amis

== Loss ==
During the night of 25 October 1801 Bonetta ran aground on a reef in the Jardines south of Cuba. She bilged, fell on her side, and was wrecked. The subsequent courtmartial absolved Commander New of all responsibility. However, it found the second officer, who had been on duty, guilty of ignoring New's orders and sleeping on watch. It ordered him to forfeit all pay due to him, to be dismissed the service, never to serve in the Navy again, and to spend two years in the Marshalsea prison.

== Legacy ==
The design of Huit Amis would inspire that of RYS Falcon, launched in 1824.
