= List of ships named Tarleton =

Several British merchant vessels have borne the name Tarleton, several of which were associated with the Tarleton family of Liverpool, who for three generations engaged in the trade in enslaved people: (Note: Thomas Tarleton is recorded as having owned slave ships from 1717. His brother John also had ownership interests, sometime with his brother. Thomas was the father of John Tarleton (slave trader). John and Jane (Parker) Tarleton were parents of John Tarleton (MP), Banastre Tarleton, Thomas Tarleton, Bridget (Tarleton) Falconer (also spelt Bridgett and Falkner), and Clayton Tarleton. Banastre Tarleton did not engage in trading enslaved people. However, as an MP, he opposed abolition on behalf of his constituents (amongst which were his family). John (the MP), and his brothers Thomas and Clayton had ownership interests in ships engaged in the trade.)

- Tarleton (1780 ship) was built in France in 1778. By 1780, she was in English hands and trading between Liverpool and Jamaica. Between 1785 and 1788, she made two voyages transporting enslaved people. She foundered on 28 November 1788, off St David's Head on her way from Liverpool to Africa.
- Tarleton, of 130 tons (bm), entered Lloyd's Register in 1779, with owner and master J. Devereux, and trade London-New York. Early listings gave her year of launch as 1776, and the place as New York. However, by 1783, her place of launch was given as Virginia. Also, there are indications that she may have originally borne the name Saratoga. During the war years her armament was four 4-pounder and four 6-pounder guns. She was last listed in 1786.
- Tarleton (1780 Glasgow ship) was launched at Glasgow in 1780. She was a privateer and merchantman that the French captured in 1782, in the Caribbean, and took into the French Navy. They took her back to France where she served in the Mediterranean. The British captured her at the Siege of Toulon and took her into service as HMS Tarleton, but sold her in 1796, as unfit for further service.
- Tarleton (1789 ship) was launched in 1789, at Liverpool for Tarleton & Co. She was a West Indiaman but also made a voyage as a privateer and another transporting enslaved people. The French captured her in 1797, after she had landed her captives. She returned to British ownership c. 1803, and traded generally until she wrecked at the Cape of Good Hope in April 1818.
- Tarleton (1796 ship) was launched in 1796, at Liverpool for Tarleton & Co. She made two voyages as a transport of enslaved people before she was lost at Cape Palmas in late 1798.

== See also ==
- Banastre (1787 ship) - vessel possibly named for Banastre Parker or Banastre Tarleton
