= Tarlton =

Tarlton may refer to:

== Places ==
- Tarlton, Gauteng, a settlement in South Africa
- Tarlton, Gloucestershire, a location in England
- Tarlton, Ohio, United States
- Tarlton International Raceway

== People ==
=== Given name ===
- Tarlton Rayment (1882-1964), Australian artist, author, broadcaster, poet, naturalist, entomologist and beekeeper

=== Surname ===
- Donald K. Tarlton (1943–2026), Canadian entertainment businessman
- Richard Tarlton (1530-1588), English actor

== See also ==
- Tarleton, a village in Lancashire, England
- Tarleton (surname)
