= Tarleton (surname) =

Tarleton or Tarlton is a surname. Notable people with the surname include:

- Banastre Tarleton (1754–1833), British soldier and politician, namesake of the Tarleton helmet
- Cullie Tarleton, American businessman and politician
- Donald K. Tarlton (born 1943), Canadian businessman
- Francis Alexander Tarleton (1841–1920), Irish mathematical physicist
- Gael Tarleton (born 1959), American politician
- John Tarleton (American settler) (ca. 1808–1895), American rancher
- John Tarleton (Royal Navy officer) (1811–1880), British naval officer
- Ken Tarleton (1900–1984), Australian rugby union player
- Nel Tarleton (1906–1956), English boxer
- Richard Tarlton (died 1588), English actor

== See also ==
- Tarleton, village in Lancashire, England
- Tarlton (disambiguation)
