= HMS Musquito (1799) =

History

France
- Name: Hunter
- Captured: 1799

Great Britain
- Name: HMS Musquito
- Acquired: By capture 1799
- Fate: Sold 1802

General characteristics
- Type: Schooner
- Armament: 12 guns

HMS Musquito (or Mosquito) was a 12-gun schooner, previously a French privateer. The Royal Navy captured her in 1799. Musquito having just been lost to capture, the navy took their capture into service as Musquito. During her brief service on the Jamaica station Musquito captured several merchantmen and a small armed vessel. The Navy sold her in 1802.

== Capture ==
The Royal Navy captured a privateer, possibly Hunter, in the West Indies in 1799. (Note: There is no other record that would definitively determine the name of the vessel that became Musquito. One possible origin is the French privateer Chasseur that Aimable and Scourge captured on 8 April 1798 off Porto Rico. Chasseur was a schooner of two guns and 18 men. It is not clear why the Navy did not use the name Hunter or Chasseur as neither belonged to a serving naval vessel.)

== Career ==
At some point in May 1799, Musquito and Squirrel captured a Spanish schooner from Port au Plat that was carrying dollars.

In second-half of 1799, Musquito captured the French schooner Byoneuse, which was sailing from Jérémie to Saint Jago de Cuba with a cargo of coffee and household furniture.

During the same period Musquito also captured the French schooner Floretta, of two guns and a crew of ten men. Floretta, of 28 tons (bm), had been sailing from Barracoa to Cape François with a cargo of flour.

In early 1800 Musquito recaptured the American schooner Experiment, which was carrying rum and sugar.

The Naval Chronicle listed the commander of the Musquito schooner in late 1801 or early 1800 as Lieutenant J. Bennett.

In July 1801 Lowestoffe, Acasta, the sloop Bonetta, and the schooners Musquito (or Muskito), and Sting joined to escort a convoy to Britain. On 10 August Lowestoffe grounded, as did five merchantmen. In the late afternoon of 11 August Acasta left Bonetta and three of her own boats to help the wrecked vessels and then took command of the convoy.

== Fate ==
The navy sold Musquito at Jamaica on 25 August 1802 for £750.
