= HMS Lowestoffe (1761) =

British fifth-rate frigate

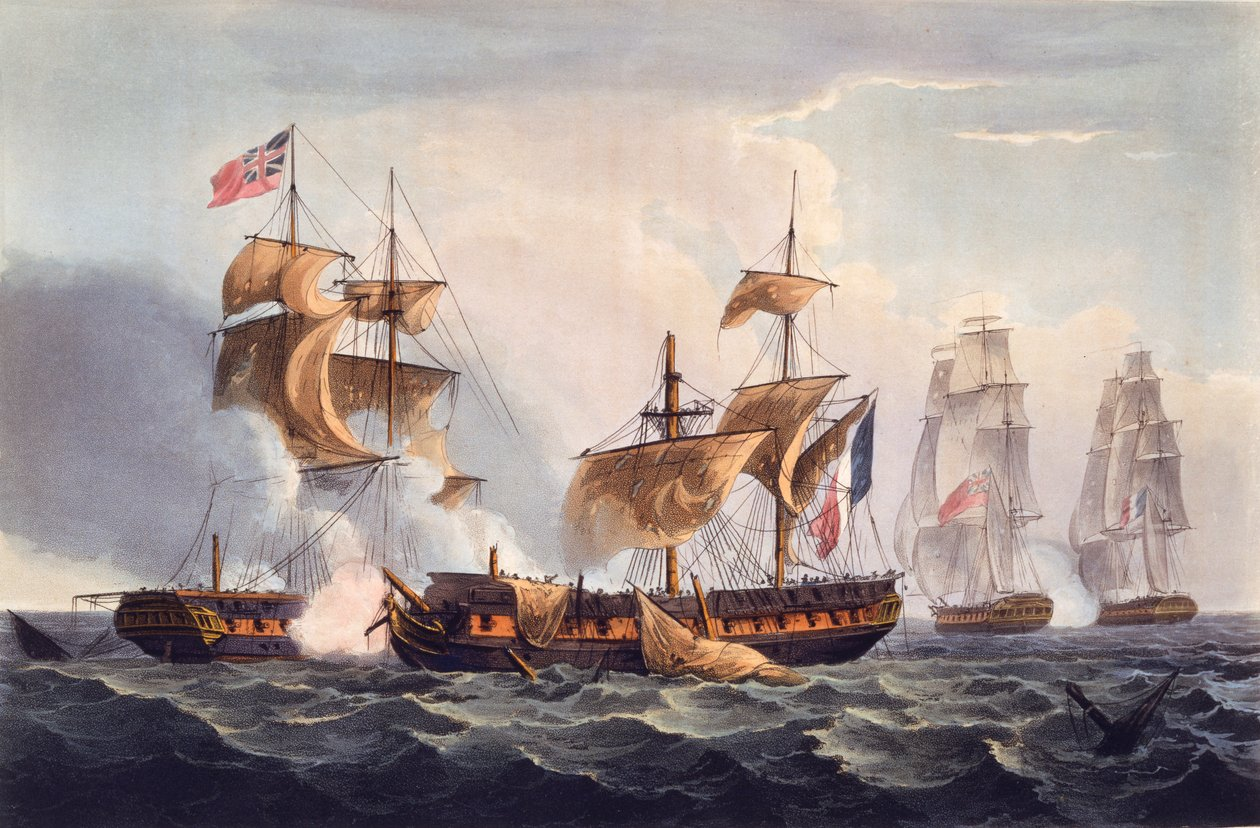
- Capture of La Minerve off Toulon, June 24th, 1795 by Thomas Whitcombe. In the foreground the damaged and dismasted Minerve duels with HMS Dido, while in the background Lowestoffe pursues a fleeing Artémise.

History

Great Britain
- Name: HMS Lowestoffe
- Ordered: 15 February 1760
- Builder: Thomas West, Deptford Dockyard
- Laid down: 9 May 1760
- Launched: 5 June 1761
- Completed: 1 August 1761
- Honours and awards: Naval General Service Medal with clasp "Lowestoffe 24 June 1795"
- Fate: Wrecked on 11 August 1801

General characteristics
- Class & type: 32-gun fifth-rate frigate
- Tons burthen: 717 16/94 (bm)
- Length: 130 ft 6 in (39.8 m) (gundeck); 108 ft 1 in (32.9 m) (keel)
- Beam: 35 ft 3 3/4 in (10.8 m)
- Draught: 9 ft 4 in (2.8 m)
- Depth of hold: 12 ft 6 in (3.8 m)
- Sail plan: Full-rigged ship
- Complement: 220
- Armament: Gun deck: 26 × 12-pounder guns; Quarterdeck: 4 × 6-pounder guns; Forecastle: 2 × 6-pounder guns + 12 × 1/2-pounder swivels

HMS Lowestoffe was a 32-gun fifth-rate frigate of the Royal Navy. Built during the latter part of the Seven Years' War, she went on to see action in the American War of Independence and the French Revolutionary War, and served often in the Caribbean. A young Horatio Nelson served aboard her shortly after passing his lieutenant's examination.

Originally commissioned near the end of the Seven Years' War, Lowestoffe patrolled in British waters until 1773, when it underwent repairs. She was recommissioned in 1777 and served throughout the American War of Independence, including at the Battle of San Fernando de Omoa. After the bulk of the fighting ended, she returned home to Portsmouth in 1782, and did not see battle for the next decade. She spent most of her later years in British and Mediterranean waters, winning particular glory for her part in an engagement with two French frigates in 1795. Her final duties were back in the familiar waters of the West Indies, where she was wrecked in 1801 while escorting a convoy in the Caicos Islands.

== Construction and commissioning ==
Sir Thomas Slade based his design for Lowestoffe on that of HMS Aurora, which was a former French vessel named Abenakise. (The Admiralty routinely "took the lines", i.e., drew up blueprints, of captured vessels, and these blueprints were available to designers such as Slade.)

Lowestoffe was the only ship built to her design, though over a decade later the Navy would have two more frigates, HMS Orpheus and HMS Diamond, built to a modification of the design of Lowestoffe and Abenakise. She was ordered on 15 February 1760 from Thomas West, Deptford Dockyard, with West contracted to launch her within 12 months, at a cost of £11.0.0d per ton. Lowestoffe was laid down on 9 May 1760, launched on 5 June 1761 and completed by 1 August 1761. She officially received the name Lowestoffe on 28 October 1760. She had cost a total of £7,715 1s 10 3/4d to build, coming in just slightly under the contracted price of £7887. The Navy spent a further £4,281 7s 8d on having her fitted out.

== Career ==
Commissioned late in the Seven Years' War, she saw little action under her first captain, Walter Stirling, and the Navy paid her off in 1762. Lowestoffe was initially moored at Portsmouth. Then in early 1763 she was armed and stored, sailing on 26 July 1763 under the command of her new captain James Baker.

After spending some time cruising in the English Channel and stopping neutral merchants for inspections, Baker sailed Lowestoffe to Madeira and then on to the West Indies. She arrived at Carlisle Bay on 13 September, and then sailed on to Antigua. During her time at Carlisle Bay, Lowestoffe carried out patrols between Barbados and Antigua.

She was part of a squadron under Rear Admiral Tyrrell. Four vessels of the squadron, Princess Louisa, Lowestoffe, Virgin and Beaver, shared in the prize money arising from the seizure in January and February 1764 of several vessels engaged in illicit trade near Dominica. The seized vessels were the Sarah, Union, Mary Anne, Pastora, Elizabeth, Two Sisters, and June and Betsey.

Baker died on 31 March 1765. His successor, Joseph Norwood, sailed Lowestoffe home to be paid off in August 1766. Lowestoffe underwent a small repair at Sheerness between December 1766 and April 1767, and after a period out of service was recommissioned again in June 1769 under Captain Robert Carkett. Carkett returned her to the West Indies in October that year, returning in May 1773 to Britain after four years at Jamaica. She was paid off in 1773, and reduced to a 28-gun Sixth Rate.

=== American War of Independence ===
Lowestoffe now underwent a large repair. She was recommissioned under Captain William Locker in early 1777 and prepared for service in the Leeward Islands. Joining her for this voyage was a young Lieutenant Horatio Nelson, who had passed his examination on 9 April, and was joining the Lowestoffe as her second lieutenant. Also serving on the Lowestoffe at this time was Cuthbert Collingwood, who would go on to have an enduring friendship with Nelson, serving with him on a number of occasions, including at the Battle of Trafalgar. The ship sailed in early May, escorting a convoy to the West Indies, where they arrived in mid July. She was coppered at Jamaica and then went on a number of cruises, capturing an American sloop with a cargo of rice in August 1777. On 21 August 1777 she captured sloop Phoenix. On 12 September she captured sloop Mary Angelic. She captured schooner Burford on an unknown date. On 20 November 1777 she captured North Carolina privateer brig Resolution.

A second cruise saw the capture of an American privateer, and a notable incident for Nelson. Lowestoffe sent her boat and first lieutenant to take over the prize, but the seas were too rough to allow the American to be boarded, so the lieutenant returned. Nelson stepped forward and volunteered to make an attempt; he succeeded.

On 25 March 1778 Lowestoffe captured the sloop Swan, Daniel Smith, Master. She was of 60 tons, had a crew of seven men, and was carrying a cargo of molasses.

By the time of Lowestoffe's third cruise, Nelson had taken command of the ship's tender, the schooner Little Lucy. Locker and the Lowestoffe spent the rest of 1778 and the early part of 1779 carrying out routine cruises and patrols, until Captain Christopher Parker replaced him in March 1779. Locker, who had by now been ill for some time, had recommended Nelson to Sir Peter Parker, who found a space for Nelson aboard his flagship, the 50-gun HMS Bristol. Nelson joined her as third lieutenant on 1 July 1778.

On 8 February 1779, Lowestoffe captured the Vigilant, near the Bite (or Bight) of Leogan. The 70 ton sloop was sailing from Dominique to Philadelphia with a cargo of sugar, rum, molasses, coffee, cotton and salt. John English was her master and she had a crew of five men.

Lowestoffe became part of Captain John Luttrell's squadron and carried out operations in the Bay of Honduras in October and November 1779. On 17 October Lowestoffe, together with Pomona, Charon, and Porcupine participated in the successful British attack on the Fort of San Fernandino de Omoa. During the attack Lowestoffe exchanged fire with the fort. While she was doing this she ran aground. Her immobility made her an easy target for the fort's guns. Eventually boats were able to pull Lowestoffe off, but not before she had sustained extensive damage. She had contributed a landing party to the assault on the fort and in all lost three men killed and five wounded. As a result of the battle the British ships captured two Spanish prizes with a cargo of bullion worth in excess of $3,000,000. Lowestoffe and Pomona also shared in the prize money for the St. Domingo and her cargo, which included 124 serons (crates) of indigo.

On 26 March 1780 Lowestoffe captured the small sloop Fortune, of 25 tons, off Cape Francois. Under the command of William Nevill, she had a crew of three and was sailing from North Carolina to Cape Francois with provisions. Also in early 1800 Lowestoffe captured the Danish brig Diana, which was sailing from St. Domingo to St. Thomas with a cargo of mahogany. Then on 15 June Lowestoffe, Phoenix and Pomona captured the brig Delaware, William Collins, Master. She was of 120 tons, armed with guns and had a crew of 53 men. She was sailing from Philadelphia to Port-au-Prince, with a cargo of flour and fish. More importantly, they also captured the French navy cutter Sans Pareil, of 16 guns and 100 men, as she was sailing from Martinique to Cap-Français. She was the former British privateer Non Such.

Later Lowestoffe detained a Danish schooner sailing from Acuba to Jacquemel with a cargo of cattle. She also recaptured the British brig John, which a French privateer had taken, and herself took a Spanish brig sailing from La Guaira to Tenerife with a cargo of cocoa and spices.

On 26 September Lowestoffe and Pallas captured two small vessels. One was the sloop Fair Henrietta, of 70 tons, sailing from Philadelphia to Cape Francois with a load of lumber and bricks. The second was the brig St. Salvadore, with a crew of 13 men, sailing from New Orleans to Havana with a cargo of lumber. In late 1800 or early 1801 Lowestoffe captured a Spanish brig (name unknown) of 110 tons, laden with sugar and staves.

Between 2 and 4 October Lowestoffe survived a hurricane that badly damaged numerous British warships. The hurricane also caused Barbadoes, Scarborough and Victor to founder, i.e., to be lost at sea with all hands.

Captain Christopher Parker transferred into Diamond on 1 November 1780, Captain James Cornwallis briefly to replace him on Lowestoffe. Cornwallis requested and received a transfer to HMS Badger five weeks later. His successor was Captain Thomas Haynes. Under Haynes, Lowestoffe and Janus captured the sloop Dispatch, Giles Sagg, Master, on 18 January 1781, off Heneauge. She was 60 tons, and carried four guns and a crew of 14 men. She was on her way from Port-au-Prince to Philadelphia with a cargo of coffee and sugar.

Haynes left in May 1781 to take over the 64-gun third rate Ruby. Her next captain was George Stoney, with Captain Thomas Windsor replacing him on 31 January 1782. Windsor sailed Lowestoffe home and paid her off at Portsmouth. She was laid up there for nine months, before being moved to the River Thames.

=== The years of peace ===
Robert Batson, of Limehouse carried out a great repair on Lowestoffe between July 1783 and March 1786. She returned to service in the English Channel in October 1787 under Captain Edmund Dodd. She sailed to the Mediterranean in May 1788, before returning to Britain where Captain Robert Stopford briefly took command in November 1790. Lowestoffe was paid off later that year and was fitted out at Plymouth between July 1792 and January 1793. Lowestoffe was then recommissioned in December 1792 under Captain William Wolseley.

=== French Revolutionary War ===
Lowestoffe sailed to the Mediterranean in May 1793, joining Hood's fleet then blockading Toulon. She joined a flying squadron under Commodore Robert Linzee to act against French forces in the Mediterranean. On 30 September 1793, Linzee took his squadron, including Lowestoffe, into the Gulf of San Fiorenzo to attack the redoubt of Forneilli on Corsica. Lowestoffe fired two broadsides at a tower at Mortella Point that protected the deep entrance to the gulf. The fire caused the tower's French defenders to abandon the tower and its three guns, allowing a landing party from Lowestoffe under the command of Lieutenants Francis Annesley and John Gibb to capture the tower. Linzee, however, delayed his assault on the city until he could bring his larger ships into action. These larger ships bombarded the town from 1 October, but sustained considerable damage from the garrison, which forced Linzee to withdraw. (Note: On 7 February 1794, the 74-gun HMS Fortitude and the 32-gun HMS Juno, unsuccessfully attacked the tower. The tower eventually fell to land-based forces under Sir John Moore after two days of heavy fighting. The effectiveness of the tower, when properly supplied and defended, impressed the British, who copied the design for what they would call Martello towers.)

Lowestoffe remained in the area, supporting British operations against the French garrisons on Corsica during 1794. On 7 March 1794 Captain Charles Cunningham took over command from Wolsely. A little over a month later, on 13 April Lowestoffe captured the Etoile du Nord. HMS Dido, Aimable and Imperieuse shared in the capture. Lowestoffe then was among the British warships that shared in the capture, on 24 May, of the French brigs Jacobin and Natine.

Captain Benjamin Hallowell replaced Cunningham on 12 August. Hallowell commanded Lowestoffe during the Naval Battle of Genoa on 14 March 1795, during which she received some damage from long range shots from the French fleet. Captain Robert Gambier Middleton replaced Hallowell in June 1795.

==== Dido and Lowestoffe defeat Minerve and Artémise ====
Admiral Hotham then sent Lowestoffe, with the 28-gun Dido under Captain George Henry Towry, to reconnoitre the French fleet at Toulon. While off Menorca on 24 June 1795 the two frigates encountered two French frigates, the 42-gun Minerve and the 36-gun Artémise. The French were initially wary, but when they realised that they were larger and stronger than the British vessels, the French captains manoeuvred to attack. Minerve attempted to run down Dido but when Dido turned to avoid the impact Minerve's bowsprit became entangled in Dido's rigging, costing Dido her mizzenmast and colours. Lowestoffe came along the port side of the Frenchman to discharge a broadside that carried away Minerve's foremast and topmasts, crippling her. Lowestoffe pursued the retreating Artémise, which eventually escaped. Lowestoffe returned to Minerve, firing on her until she struck. Lowestoffe had three men wounded, the Dido six killed and 15 wounded. Minerve lost about 10 percent of her crew of over 300 men. The British took Minerve into service as the 38-gun frigate HMS Minerve. The weight of Minerve's broadside alone was greater than that of the two British frigates together, making the battle a notable victory; the Royal Navy duly awarded each of the two captains a Naval Gold Medal. In 1847, Naval General Service Medals with clasps "Lowestoffe 24 June 1795" or "Dido 24 June 1795" were awarded to six surviving crew members.

== Later service ==
Captain Robert Plampin relieved Middleton in December 1795, going on to serve with a squadron under Thomas Troubridge. After a refit in Britain, Lowestoffe escorted convoys in the West Indies.

On 14 September 1796 she captured Lesou. Lowestoffe was also among the vessels that in late 1799 captured the Spanish letter of marque Navarra (alias Diligent). Diligent was of 150 tons and was armed with eight guns. She was sailing from Bilbao to Veracruz with a cargo of wine, iron and writing paper. Lowestoffe also shared in the capture of the Spanish "zartan" Ambrosia, which was sailing from Cádiz for Veracruz with a cargo of 26.5 tons of quicksilver and 10 tons of writing paper. Lowestoffe alone captured the Spanish brig San Francisco, of 90 tons, sailing from Campeche to Havana with a cargo of sugar and logwood.

== Loss ==
Lowestoffe sailed from Kingston, Jamaica on 22 July 1801, and met a convoy five days later at Port Antonio. The escorts consisted of Lowestoffe, Acasta, the sloop Bonetta, and the schooners Musquito (or Muskito), and Sting.

While Lowestoffe was sailing through the Caicos passage late on 10 August, Pamplin realised that the strong currents known to run through the channel had reversed direction and Lowestoffe was running into shallow waters. He attempted to avoid grounding, but to no avail, and the Lowestoffe ran broadside onto Little Inagua ("Heneaga") Island. The crew threw stores and equipment overboard to lighten the ship, and boats came from other ships in the convoy to try to pull her off. The attempts to refloat her failed and her crew abandoned her by mid-afternoon. The only casualties were five men who drowned when their boat capsized in the surf. The change in currents also caused the wreck of five, or six merchantmen.

In the late afternoon of 11 August Acasta left Bonetta and three of her own boats to help the wrecked vessels and then took command of the convoy.

The subsequent court-martial at Port Royal on 3 September ruled that a sudden change in the current after dark had caused the loss. The board acknowledged that Pamplin had sailed in a judicious manner and exonerated him and his officers from blame both for the loss of Lowestoffe and the vessels in convoy.

In April 1803 the officers and crew of Lowestoffe and of Bonetta received payment for the salvage of the specie that Lowestoffe was carrying.
