= HMS Dido (1784) =

Enterprise-class Royal Navy frigate

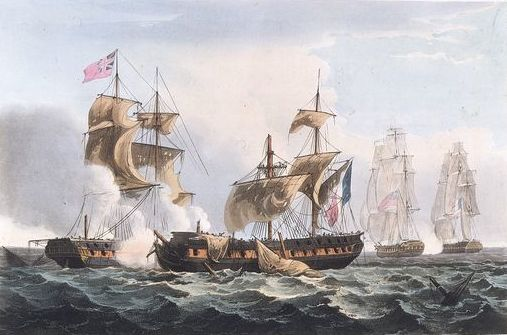
- Capture of La Minerve off Toulon, 24 June 1795 by Thomas Whitcombe. In the foreground the damaged and dismasted Minerve duels with HMS Dido, while in the background Artémise flees, pursued by Lowestoffe.

History

Great Britain
- Name: HMS Dido
- Ordered: 5 June 1782
- Builder: Joshua Stewart and Mr. Hall; Sandgate, Kent
- Laid down: September 1782
- Launched: 27 November 1784
- Completed: 15 March 1785
- Commissioned: September 1787
- Honors and awards: Naval General Service Medal with clasps: "Dido 24 June 1795"; "Egypt"
- Fate: Sold to be broken up, 3 April 1817

General characteristics
- Tons burthen: 595 39/94 (bm)
- Length: 120 ft 5 in (36.70 m) (gundeck); 99 ft 3 in (30.25 m) (keel)
- Beam: 33 ft 7 in (10.24 m)
- Depth of hold: 11 ft 0 in (3.35 m)
- Sail plan: Full-rigged ship
- Complement: 200 officers and men
- Armament: Upper deck: 24 × 9-pounder guns; QD: 4 × 6-pounder guns + 4 × 18-pounder carronade; Fc: 2 × 18-pounder carronades

HMS Dido was one of the twenty-seven Enterprise class of 28-gun sixth-rate frigates in service with the Royal Navy during the late eighteenth and early nineteenth centuries. Dido was commissioned in September 1787 under the command of Captain Charles Sandys. She participated in a notable action for which her crew would later be awarded the Naval General Service Medal; her participation in a campaign resulted in the award of another. Dido was sold for breaking up in 1817.

== Vrai Patriote ==
On 9 August 1793 Dido was patrolling off Norway when she encountered a French privateer. She drove the vessel ashore, and Lieutenant Edward Hamilton took a boat and eight men to take possession. The privateer was the Vrai Patriote, of 13 guns and a crew of 45 men, whose crew had set her on fire before escaping ashore. Hamilton and his men extinguished the fire, the setting of which Hamilton considered a "base attempt" as had it been successful it would have deprived the British of prize money. Unwilling to let the matter go, Hamilton and his men pursued the privateers inland and captured 13 of them. The British then brought out the prize, for which prize money was paid in July 1799.

Hamilton and his prize crew of two midshipmen and twenty sailors were taking Vrai Patriote back when they encountered the cutter Nimble. Nimble had been looking for privateer, and not realizing that the Dido had captured her, attempted to take Vrai Patriote. Hamilton hoisted British colors over the French and sent his crew below decks while he attempted to convince Nimble that the French vessel was now in British hands. Nimble, unconvinced, fired several broadsides into Vrai Patriote causing damage but no casualties. Eventually Nimble was convinced and ceased fire. Nimble herself suffered casualties when one of her guns burst.

Dido was the only ship of the Mediterranean Fleet to exchange fire with French ships during Martin's cruise of 1794, but was unable to prevent the French escaping into Gourjean Bay.

Dido captured Révolution, a French vessel possibly a navy corvette, on 8 October 1794 off Porto Mauruzio between Nice and Genoa.

Dido captured the xebec Témėraire on 14 March 1795. The Royal Navy took her into service as HMS Temeraire, later renamed to HMS Transfer. (Note: French records suggest that she was armed with six guns. British records refer to her as a 20-gun cutter.)

== Dido and Lowestoffe vs. Minerve and Artemise ==
Admiral Hotham sent Dido under Captain George Henry Towry and Lowestoffe, a 32-gun fifth-rate frigate under Captain Robert Middleton, to reconnoiter the French fleet at Toulon. While off Menorca on 24 June 1795 the two British frigates encountered two French frigates, the 42-gun Minerve and the 36-gun Artémise.

The French were initially wary, but when they realised that they were larger and stronger than the British vessels, the French captains manoeuvred to attack. Minerve attempted to run down Dido but when Dido turned to avoid the impact, Minerve's bowsprit became entangled in Dido's rigging, costing Dido her mizzenmast and colours. Lowestoffe came along the port side of Minerve and her broadside carried away Minerve's foremast and topmasts, crippling her. Lowestoffe pursued the retreating Artémise, which eventually escaped. Lowestoffe returned to Minerve, firing on her until she struck. Lowestoffe had three men wounded, the Dido six killed and 15 wounded. Minerve lost about 10 percent of her crew of over 300 men.

The British took Minerve into service as the 38-gun frigate HMS Minerve. The weight of Minerve's broadside alone was greater than that of the two British frigates together, making the battle a notable victory; the Admiralty duly awarded the two captains a Naval Gold Medal each. In 1847 the Admiralty issued to all surviving claimants from the action the Naval General Service Medal with the clasps "Dido 24 June 1795" and "Lowestoffe 24 June 1795".

Because Dido served in the navy's Egyptian campaign between 8 March 1801 and 2 September, her officers and crew qualified for the clasp "Egypt" to the Naval General Service Medal. (Note: A first-class share of the prize money awarded in April 1823 was worth £34 2s 4d; a fifth-class share, that of a seaman, was worth 3s 11½d. The amount was small as the total had to be shared between 79 vessels and the entire army contingent.)

== Fate ==
Dido was sold to break up on 3 April 1817.
