= French ship Révolutionnaire (1793) =

French Navy xebec

History

France
- Name: Révolutionnaire
- Commissioned: October 1793
- Renamed: 1794:Téméraire; May 1795:Tympan (not implemented)
- Captured: 14 March 1795

Great Britain
- Name: HMS Temeraire
- Acquired: 14 March 1795 by capture
- Renamed: HMS Transfer
- Fate: Broken up 1803

General characteristics
- Sail plan: Xebec
- Armament: Téméraire:2 × 12-pounder + 2 × 8-pounder + 2 × 4-pounder guns; Transfer:8 guns

Révolutionnaire was a xebec that the French Navy commissioned in October 1793 and renamed Téméraire in 1794. HMS Dido captured her in the Mediterranean in 1795. She served for some time as HMS Temeraire until the Royal Navy changed her name to HMS Transfer. She was sold in 1803.

== French navy ==
The French navy commissioned Révolutionnaire in October 1793 and renamed her Téméraire in 1794. Dido captured her in the Mediterranean on 14 March 1795. In May (probably on 30 May), i.e., after her capture, the French Navy underwent a mass renaming exercise and Téméraire was renamed Tympan. However, the French Navy then struck her at Toulon at end-1795.

== Royal Navy ==
Dido captured Téméraire on 14 March 1795. British records refer to her as a cutter of 20 guns.

The Royal Navy took Téméraire into service and at some point renamed her Transfer. The British history is uncertain as there was a second HMS Transfer operating in the Mediterranean between 1797 and 1802. Allocation of captains and assignments for both after early 1797 is tentative. Generally, British records refer to the Transfer of this article as a cutter, and the second as a brig.

Lieutenant John Maitland was promoted to Commander and command of Transfer in late 1795. (Note: Marshall describes her as a polacre-rigged ship with the establishment of a sloop, but carrying only eight guns. There are two problems with this. First, the polacca was the second Transfer. Second, she was not captured until April 1797.) In her he sailed in the vicinity of Gibraltar. On 13 February 1797, the eve of the battle of Cape St Vincent, Transfer was escorting a convoy to Lisbon. Maitland found himself in a fog, and then with the enemy fleet between him and his charges; he was only able to extricate Transfer with some difficulty. In April Maitland transferred to the brig Kingfisher.

On 21 October 1796 Captain Nelson wrote to Admiral Jervis that he, Nelson, was sending Tarleton to Jervis so that, as Jervis wanted, he could transfer Lieutenant William Proby to Téméraire. However, on 2 December Jervis wrote from Gibraltar to Lord Spencer, First Lord of the Admiralty, that he, Jervis, intended to transfer Proby to Peterell.

At some point in 1796 or early 1797, Transfer captured a Spanish brig from Puerto Rico. Admiral Nelson believed that as flag officer, he was entitled to $4000 in prize money for her.

== Fate ==
Transfer was broken up in 1803.
