= Thomas Whitcombe =

English painter

- Born: c. 19 May 1763
- Died: c. 1824 (Aged 60–61)
- Movement: Marine art

Thomas Whitcombe (c. 19 May 1763 – c. 1824) was an English painter who specialised in marine art. Among his work are over 150 actions the Royal Navy participated in during the French Revolutionary and Napoleonic Wars, and he exhibited his works at the Royal Academy, British Institution and Royal Society of British Artists. Whitcombe's pictures are highly sought after today.

== Life ==
Thomas Whitcombe was born in London between 1752 and 19 May 1763, with the latter date frequently cited. Little is known of his background or training, although speculation based on the locations depicted in his paintings may provide some clues.

It is known that he was in Bristol in 1787 and later travelled to the South Coast; there are few ports or harbours from this region that do not feature in his work. In 1789 he toured Wales and in 1813 he travelled to Devon, painting scenes around Plymouth harbour. During his career he also painted scenes showing the Cape of Good Hope, Madeira, Cuba and Cape Horn. Between 1783 and 1824 he lived in London, including addresses in Covent Garden and Somers Town during the course of his exhibiting career.

His date of death, like that of his birth, is uncertain; it was not before 1824, and possibly as late as 1834.

== Gallery ==
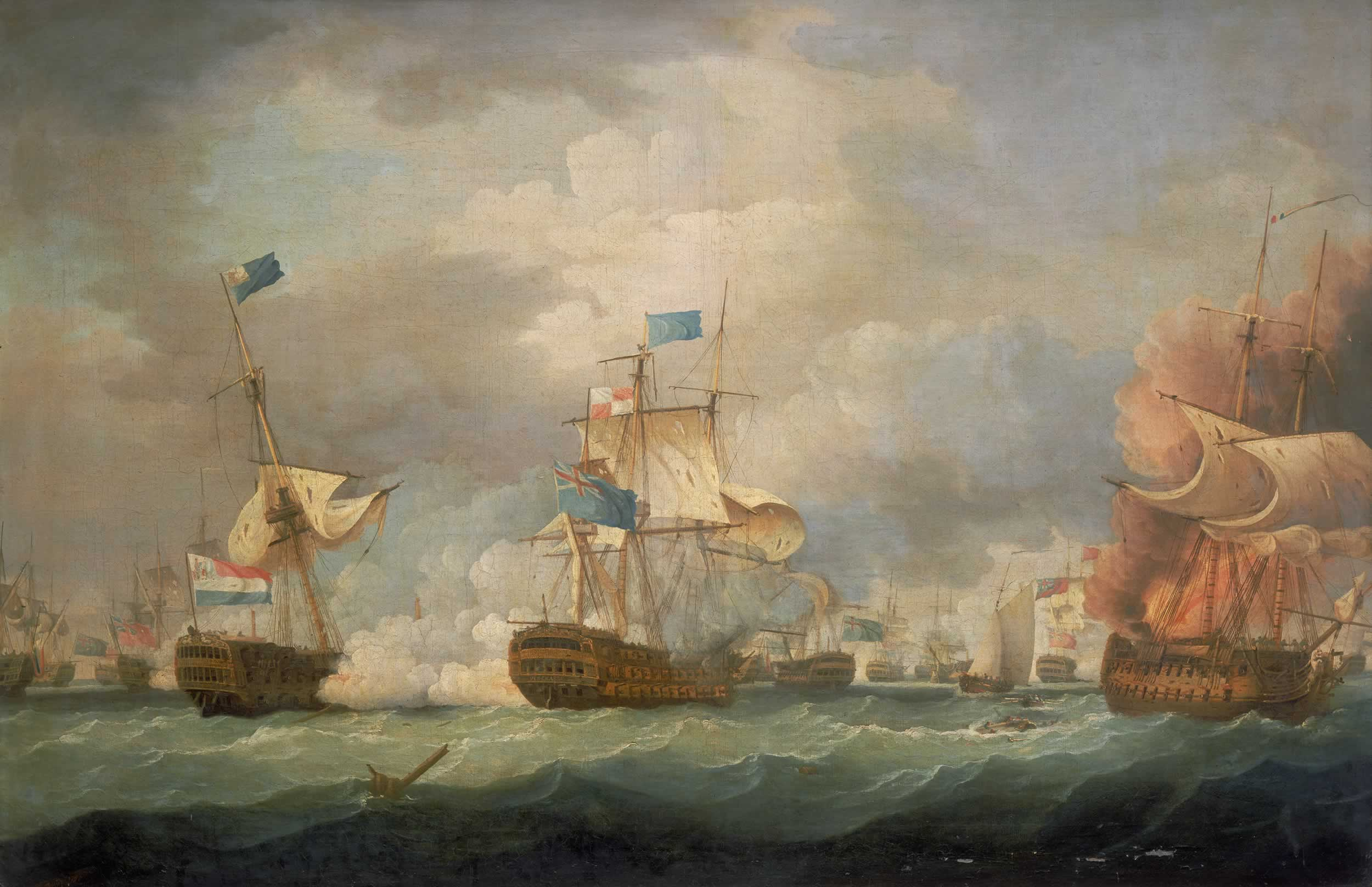
The Battle of Camperdown, 11 October 1797 by Thomas Whitcombe, painted 1798

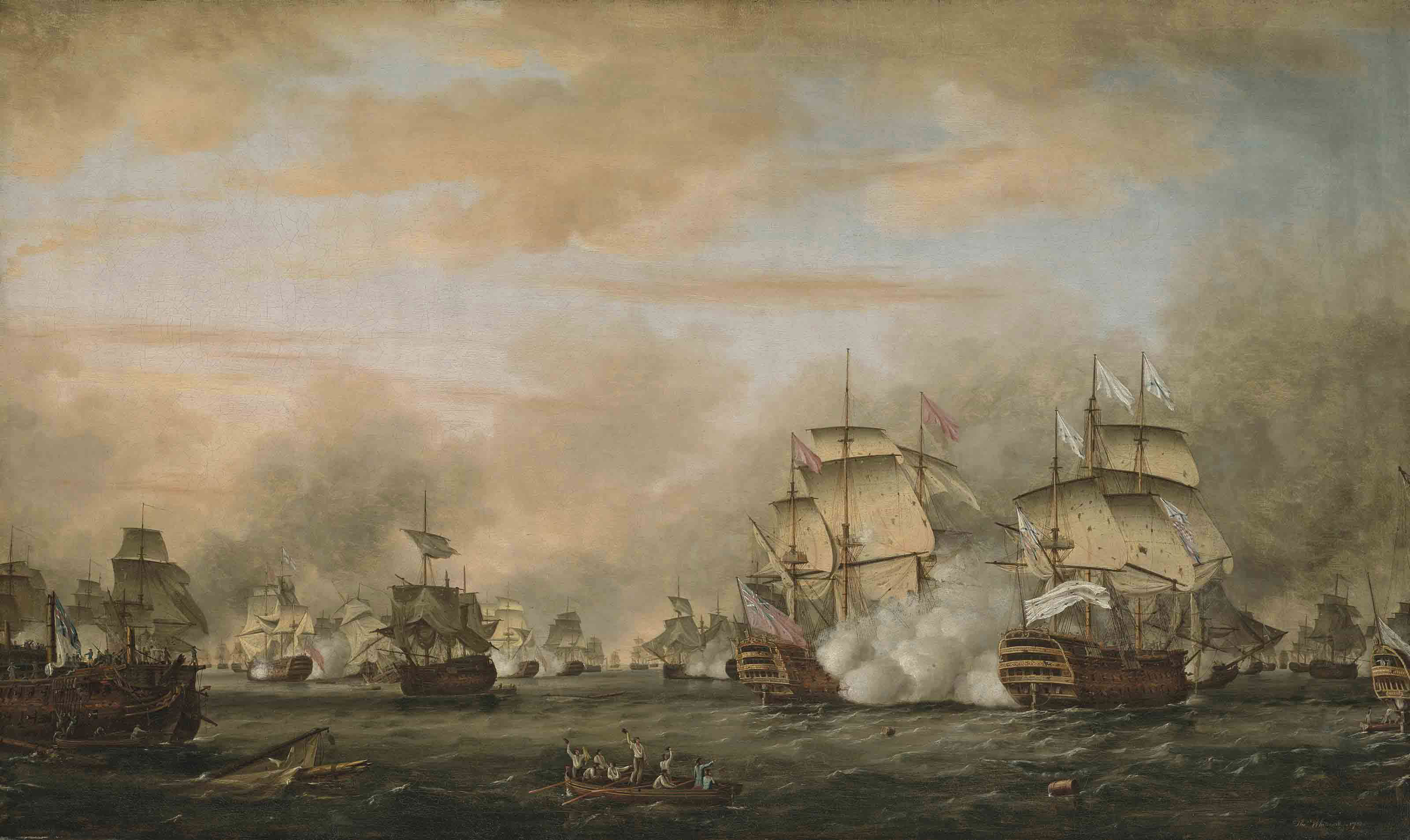
The Battle of the Saintes, 12 April 1782: surrender of the Ville de Paris by Thomas Whitcombe, painted 1783

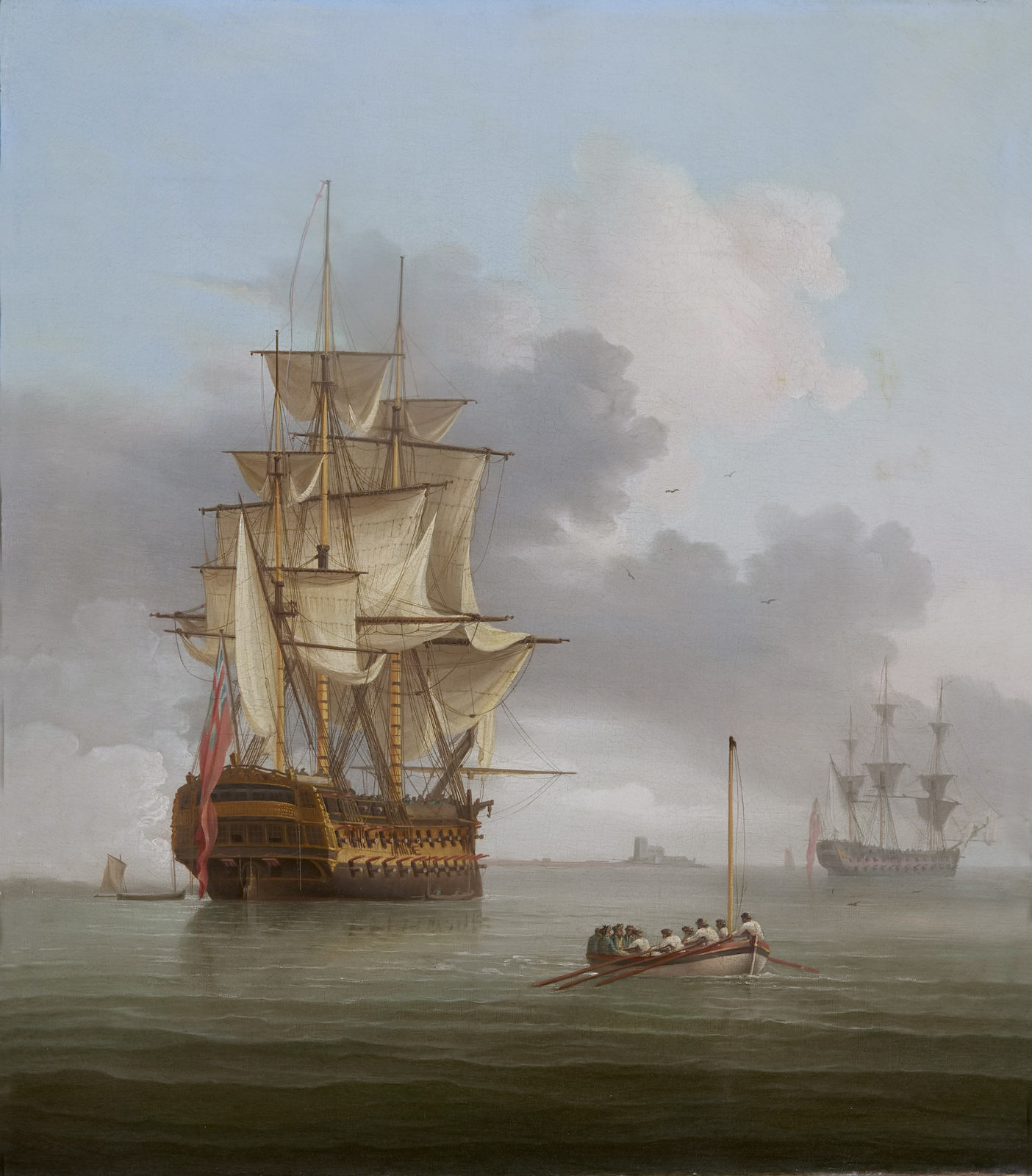
A becalmed man o'war firing a salute, 1797

== Style ==
His range of work embraced naval engagements, ship portraits, coastal scenes with shipping and ships at sea in fresh breezes and storms. The topography of the background is interesting and well observed and the depiction of the ships themselves detailed and technically very correct, a legacy of time spent in dockyards studying the subject matter. The backgrounds are delightfully atmospheric and, like many British marine artists of the 18th and 19th century, Whitcombe favoured a dark foreground.

== Artistic Achievement ==
Whitcombe was, with Nicholas Pocock, Thomas Luny, Francis Holman and Robert Dodd, a leading maritime painter of the French Revolutionary Wars and Napoleonic Wars. He painted over 150 actions of the Royal Navy including fifty plates for The Naval Achievements of Great Britain, a splendid volume issued after the cessation of hostilities.

He exhibited at the Royal Academy fifty-six times between 1783 and 1824 and once each at the British Institution and the Royal Society of British Artists. Many of his paintings are today in the collection of the National Maritime Museum, Greenwich, and in other important naval collections around the world.

== Bibliography ==
- A Dictionary of British Marine Painters, Arnold Wlison, A & C Black Publishers Ltd, 1970, ISBN 0-85317-051-7
- A Dictionary of British Landscape Painters, M H Grant, Leigh-on-sea, 1952
- The Dictionary of 18th Century British Painters, Ellis Waterhouse, published by Antique Collectors' Club Ltd, 1981, ISBN 0-902028-93-6
- British 19th Century Marine Painting, Denys Brook-Hart, published by Antique Collectors' Club Ltd, 1974, ISBN 0-902028-32-4
