= HMS Bonne Citoyenne =

Sloop of the Royal Navy

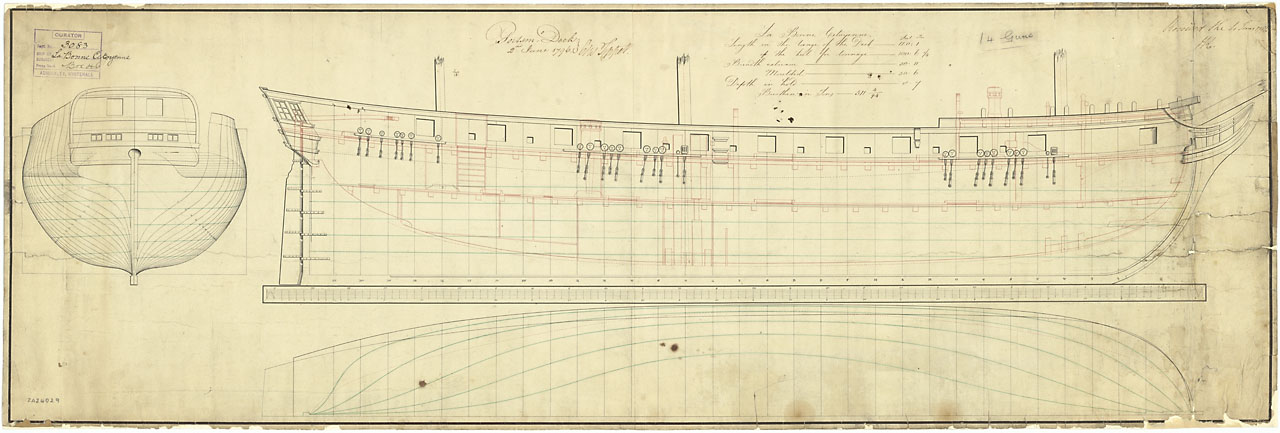
- Plan of Bonne Citoyenne made after her capture

History

/ France
- Launched: 9 July 1794
- Captured: By the Royal Navy on 10 March 1796

Great Britain
- Name: Bonne Citoyenne
- Acquired: by capture 10 March 1796
- Honours and awards: Naval General Service Medal with clasps: "St Vincent"; "Bonne Citoyenne Wh. Furieuse"
- Fate: Sold on 3 February 1819

General characteristics
- Class & type: Bonne Citoyenne-class corvette
- Tons burthen: 5114/94 (bm)
- Length: 120 ft 1 in (36.6 m) (overall); 106 ft 6 1/4 in (32.5 m) (keel)
- Beam: 30 ft 11 in (9.4 m)
- Depth of hold: 8 ft 7 in (2.6 m)
- Sail plan: Full-rigged ship
- Complement: French service: 145 men; British service: 125
- Armament: French service: 20 × 8-pounder guns; British service; Upperdeck:18 × 6-pounder guns; QD:2 × 32-pounder carronades; Later; 2 × 9-pounder bow chase guns + 18 × 32-pounder carronades

Bonne Citoyenne was a 20-gun corvette of the French Navy launched in 1794, the name ship of a four-vessel class. She was part of the French fleet active in the Bay of Biscay and English Channel. The Royal Navy captured her in 1796, commissioning her as the sloop-of-war HMS Bonne Citoyenne. (Note: In British usage, a sloop could be either brig or ship rigged. The French corvette was equivalent to the British ship-sloop.)

Under British command she served in the Mediterranean, including at the Battle of Cape St Vincent. She was taken out of service in 1803 but returned following refitting in 1808, then serving in the Atlantic. Her most famous action was the capture of the much larger French frigate Furieuse on 6 July 1809, for which her crew earned the Naval General Service Medal. The later part of her career was spent in South America. Her design was used as the basis for the Hermes-class post ships. She was laid up in 1815, and sold in 1819.

== French service and capture ==
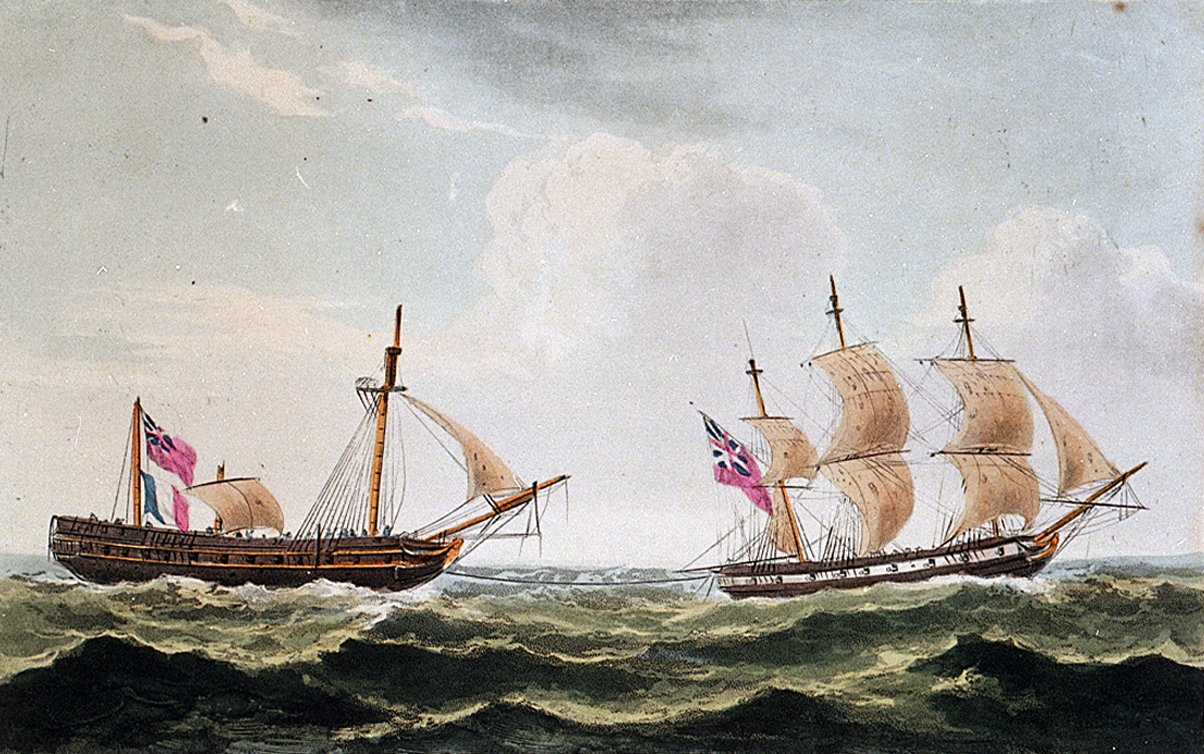
The captured Furieuse being taken in tow to Halifax, Nova Scotia by Bonne Citoyenne (right)

Bonne Citoyenne (French for 'good citizen') was built and launched in 1794, put into service in 1795 and served in the English Channel and the Bay of Biscay.

On 4 March she left Rochefort under the command of Capitaine de vaisseau Mahé-La Bourdonnais. She was in the company of the French frigates Forte, Seine, and Regenerée, and the brig Mutine. They were sailing for the Île de France with troops and Bonne Citoyenne also had a great deal of soldiers' clothing on board. (Note: Within the next three or four years the British would capture each one of these four vessels.)

Bonne Citoyenne had the misfortune to be damaged in a storm and to become separated from the rest of the French squadron. On 10 March she had the further misfortune to encounter the fifth-rate frigate HMS Phaeton, under the command of Robert Stopford, and his squadron. The squadron captured her 58 leagues off Cape Finisterre.

Stopford then took her back to England as his prize. She was commissioned into the Royal Navy as HMS Bonne Citoyenne.

Two men from Bonne Citoyenne, Sélis, who had been chief helmsman, and Thierry, a pilot, made an unsuccessful attempt to escape from Petersfield Prison after seven months captivity. Consequently, they were put on board the Lady Shore, which was to carry them, another six French prisoners, and some convicts to Botany Bay. On the way they fomented a mutiny, seized the vessel, and took her into Rio de Janeiro, where a French frigate squadron under Captain Landolphe, comprising Médée, Franchise and Concorde, rescued them.

== British service ==
=== Mediterranean ===
Bonne Citoyenne's first captain in British service was Commander Sir Charles Lindsay, who took command in June 1796. On 22 September she captured Jonge George. Ten days later, she captured Jussrouw Van Altona.

Lindsay sailed for the Mediterranean in January 1797 where she joined a squadron under Lord Viscount Garlies, off Cadiz. The squadron also included Lively, Niger, Meleager, Raven and Fortune. That month they captured the Spanish merchant vessels Santa Natalia and Caridad (alias Cubana).

Bonne Citoyenne was in company with the other vessels of Garlies' squadron when they captured the Spanish brigs San Juan Baptista on 6 February and Virgine de Monserrate three days later. At about the same time they also captured the Spanish ship San Francisco, which they sent into Lisbon.

Bonne Citoyenne was at the Battle of Cape St Vincent on 14 February, when she signaled Admiral John Jervis that she had sighted the French fleet. Bonne Citoyenne shared in the prize money arising from the battle. (Note: A captain's share was worth £99 17s 0d. A commissioned officer received £4 5s 3½d; an able seaman received 2s 1½d.) In 1847 the Admiralty authorized the issuance of the Naval General Service Medal with clasp "St. Vincent" to all surviving claimants from the battle.

The British anchored in Lagos Bay with their prizes. Jervis then sent a squadron, that included Bonne Citoyenne, under Captain Velters Cornewall Berkeley in Emerald to find the 130-gun Santissima Trinidad. Six days later they did, only for Berkeley to break off the chase and lose her, for reasons that have never been explained. Terpsichore came up and found Santissima Trinidad, firing several broadsides into her before she broke off the engagement. As Santissima Trinidad was much larger and more heavily armed than Terpsichore it is not clear what Bowen actually expected to accomplish. At some point, Bonne Citoyenne, Emerald and Alcmene shared in the proceeds of the capture of the Spanish ship Concordia.

In March Captain Lord Mark Kerr took command, only to be replaced in May by Commander Richard Retalick. Bonne Citoyenne then had a productive summer capturing two privateers and numerous other vessels:

- Pleuvier, a French privateer, of nine guns and 43 crew men. Bonne Citoyenne captured her between Carthaginia and Oran. Pleuvier was eight days out of Carthagina but had taken nothing. Bonne Citoyenne sent her to Algiers.
- Canarde, a French privateer of 16 guns and 64 crew men. She was three months out of Marseilles and had captured a Prussian, Russian and Ottoman vessel each. Bonne Citoyenne sent her into Malta.
- Two Spanish brigs sailing in ballast, from Catalonia to Trieste, but carrying 8,900 dollars.
- a Spanish tartan, Jengin (or Virgine) del Rosario, which was sailing from Barcelona to Minorca with 20 recruits. Retalick reported that "the Wind being to the Southward, and scarce of Water, sent all the Prisoners on Board of her."
- eight other Spanish merchantmen of small value.

Commander Josiah Nisbet replaced Retalick in May 1798. On 28 October, Bonne Citoyenne and Goliath captured two vessels off Capo Passaro, Sicily. Both belonged to the French Republic. The brig San Giovanni e San Nicolo was carrying corn. Bologna was carrying merchandise, with both vessel and merchandise being Genoese property.

Bonne Cityonne joined Admiral Horatio Nelson's squadron and went out with it to the Mediterranean, but did not arrive at Abu Qir Bay until ten days after the Battle of the Nile. (Note: Nisbet is variously described as Nelson's son-in-law or step-son. He was, in fact, the son of Nelson's wife, Fanny Nisbet, by her first husband.) Nisbet was promoted to post captain in December.

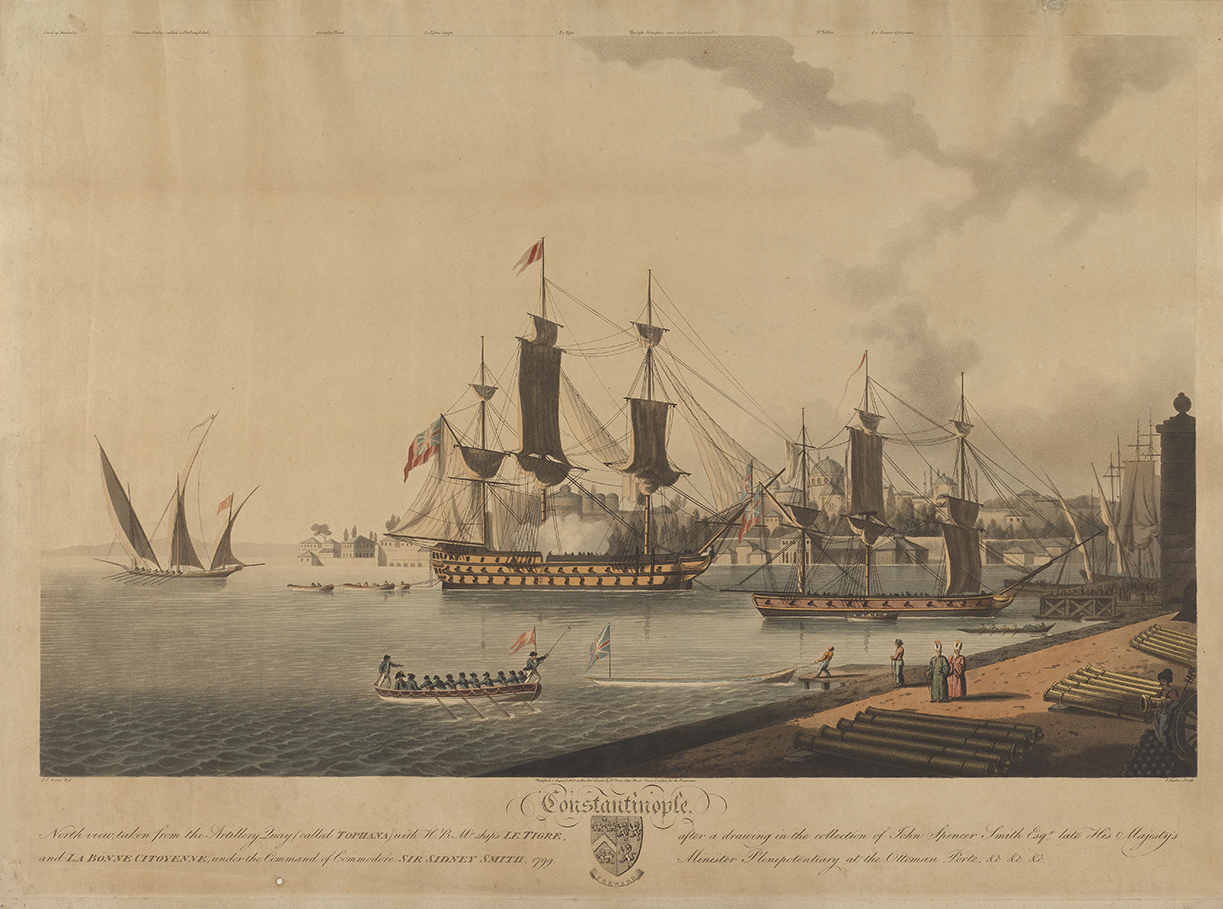
Bonne Citoyenne (right) anchored near Tophana, Constantinople alongside HMS Tigre in 1799

In January 1799 Nelson ordered Bonne Citoyenne to convey the Ottoman Ambassador to Constantinople. Nisbet returned to Palermo with dispatches from Constantinople for Nelson. She then sailed to Malta to join the fleet blockading the French garrison there, arriving in early April.

Commander Thomas Malling took over in August. His successor, in September, was Lieutenant Archibald Duff (acting), who left after the Admiralty refused to confirm the appointment. The next month Commander Robert Jackson assumed command.

Bonne Citoyenne was among the many vessels of the Malta blockade sharing in the prize money accruing from the capture on 18 February of the French warship Genereux. The first distribution of the proceeds of the hull, provisions and stores totaled £24,000. On 2 April the squadron captured Guillaume Tell, with the vessels of the squadron sharing in the prize money. Similarly Bonne Citoyenne shared in the capture on 6 April of the French polacca Vengeance, which was going into La Valletta. Next, on 27 June, vessels of the squadron captured the French privateers Redoubtable and Entreprenant. (Note: A first-class share of the head money was worth £4 11s 2d; a fifth-class share, that of a seaman, was worth 6d. A first-class share of the hull and stores was worth £13 8s; a fifth-class share was worth 3d.) Bonne Citoyenne was also among the vessels sharing in the proceeds from the capture of the French frigate Dianne on 25 August off Malta as she and Justice attempted to escape. Although the British captured Dianne, Justice was able to slip away in the dark.

On 5 September 1800, the British took Malta after two years of blockade. Bonne Citoyenne was among the vessels and regiments that shared in the prize money. On 18 October, an Anglo-Portuguese squadron shared in the capture of the Ragusan polacca Madonna Della Gratia e San Gaetano, which was carrying plate, amongst other cargo. The British vessels were Alexander, Terpsichore, Bonne Citoyenne and Incendiary, and the Portuguese vessels, Principe Real, Reynha de Portugal, Alfonso di Albuquerque, and the corvette Benjamin. The seizure on 27 October of two Greek polaccas off Malta also led to a shared payout, this one involving more, but only British vessels. One of the polaccas was the San Nicolo, but the name of the other is unknown. Nelson ordered the hulls burnt before La Valletta. The seizure on 31 October of the ship Fowler involved four other British vessels, Lutine, Pearl, Strombolo, and Transfer.

On 31 December 1800 Jackson and Bonne Citoyenne captured the Spanish privateer settee Vives about 20 leagues off Cape Mola, outside Port Mahon. Vives was armed with ten 9-pounders and had a crew of 80 men. She was ten days out of Palma and had previously captured a merchant vessel carrying wine from Port Mahon to Citadella. Jackson recaptured this ship too.

Bonne Citoyenne then returned to Gibraltar. There she was among the vessels that shared in the capture of Eurydice on 9 February 1801.

Next, she sailed for Egypt with Lord Keith's fleet. The force attacked the French at Alexandria. On 9 June, Bonne Citoyenne, and the brig-sloops Port Mahon and Victorieuse captured Bonaparte, Vierge de Nieges, Felicité and Josephine off Alexandria. The prize money was forwarded by the British agent there. Next, Bonne Citoyenne shared in the capture of Almas di Purgatoria, off Alexandria, on 28 July. After the Battle of Alexandria and the subsequent siege, Captain Alexander Cochrane in the 74-gun third rate Ajax, with Bonne Citoyenne, Cynthia, Victorieuse and Port Mahon and three Ottoman corvettes, were able to enter the harbour on 21 August.

In 1850 the Admiralty awarded the Naval general Service Medal with clasp "Egypt" to the crews of any vessel that had served in the campaign between 8 March and 2 September 1801. Bonne Cityonne is listed among the vessels whose crews qualified. (Note: A first-class share of the prize money awarded in April 1823 was worth £34 2s 4d; a fifth-class share, that of a seaman, was worth 3s 11½d. The amount was small as the total had to be shared between 79 vessels and the entire army contingent.)

Jackson was promoted to post captain in April 1802; his replacement, in May, was Commander Philip Carteret.

Bonne Citoyenne was paid off in 1803. By 1805 she was moored at Chatham, where she underwent repairs in 1808. She was recommissioned under John Thompson in May 1808, and served off the north coast of Spain. William Mounsey replaced Thompson on 18 April 1809. He then took despatches to Earl St Vincent. While Mounsey was in command of Bonne Citoyenne, she ran down and sank the merchant vessel Doris. Lieutenant Symes, first lieutenant of Bonne Citoyenne, was the officer of the watch and was on deck at the time. The owners of Doris sued Mounsey, but the case was dismissed on the grounds that Mounsey had not appointed Symes.

=== Bonne Citoyenne captures Furieuse ===
Bonne Citoyenne returned to England after delivering the despatches, and on 18 June sailed from Spithead in company with HMS Inflexible. The two were acting as escorts for a convoy bound for Quebec. Whilst she escorted the convoy, on 2 July, lookouts spotted a suspicious sail astern, and Mounsey dropped back to investigate. In doing so he lost sight of the convoy.

As he sailed to rejoin the convoy, on 5 July he came across a French frigate that was in the process of capturing an English merchant. Despite the frigate's substantially larger size, Mounsey immediately gave chase, at which the French ship fled northwards. After a chase lasting 18 hours Bonne Citoyenne caught up with the French ship on the morning of 6 July and brought her to battle.

The subsequent engagement lasted seven hours, with Bonne Citoyenne at a disadvantage early on, when three of her guns were dismounted. She nevertheless fired 129 broadsides to the enemy's 70. By the end of the battle Bonne Citoyenne had lost her top masts, her lower masts were badly damaged, and her rigging, sails and boats had been shot to pieces. Running out of powder Mounsey decided to force the issue and ordered his men to be prepared to board the French ship. Before he could do so, the French surrendered and Mounsey took possession.

The enemy ship was discovered to be Furieuse, which had sailed from the Îles des Saintes on 1 April, carrying sugar and coffee to France. She was capable of carrying 48 guns, but she was armed en flute, only carrying 20 at the time. Even so, the weight of her broadside was considerable as she carried twelve 42-pounder carronades, two long 24-pounder guns, and six other guns of smaller caliber. She also had a much larger crew, with 200 sailors, 40 soldiers, and a detachment of troops from the 60th Regiment of the Line. Furieuse had suffered heavy damage; she had lost her masts, had five feet of water in the hold, and her casualties numbered 35 killed and 37 wounded. By contrast, Bonne Citoyenne had lost just one man killed and five wounded. Mounsey attributed the smallness of his losses to "the Lowness of the Bonne Citoyenne's Hull, and being so close under the Enemy's Guns."

Furieuse was patched up, with a great deal of effort, to the point where Bonne Citoyenne could tow her into Halifax, where both underwent repairs. The Royal Navy took HMS Furieuse into service under her existing name. Bonne Citoyenne returned to England in September.

A round of promotions followed the victory. Bonne Citoyenne's first lieutenant received a promotion to commander and Mounsey one to post captain, effective 6 July, i.e., the date of the battle. Mounsey was promised command of Furieuse once she was repaired. Captain John Simpson commissioned Furieuse in Halifax and sailed her to Britain, arriving in Portsmouth on 20 June 1810. She then underwent repairs. Mounsey then commissioned her in November 1811. Inflexible sued in Vice-Admiralty Court in Halifax to share in the prize money from the capture. However, the Court ruled that Bonne Citoyenne was the sole captor.

The Admiralty issued Mounsey with a gold medal for the action, one of only 18 that they so honoured. In 1847 the Admiralty issued the Naval General Service Medal with clasp "Bonne Citoyenne Wh. Furieuse" to all surviving claimants from Bonne Cityonne.

=== Greene and the Americans ===
When Mounsey left Bonne Citoyenne in 1810, his successor was Commander Richard James Lawrence O'Connor. On 21 June 1810, Bonne Citoyenne captured the French privateer Maitre de Danse in the Channel. She was pierced for 14 guns but only mounted four, and had a crew of 30 men. O'Connor sailed Bonne Citoyenne on a convoy to Madeira on 11 July 1810. He was promoted to post captain on 21 October 1810.

In November Pitt Burnaby Greene took command. Greene was promoted to post captain on 7 March 1811, after which Bonne Citoyenne was re-classed as a post-ship. Greene sailed her to the South American Station on 12 March. Bonne Citoyenne was based at the River Plate, and Greene was the senior officer of the station from December 1811 to September 1812 when Captain Peter Heywood arrived.

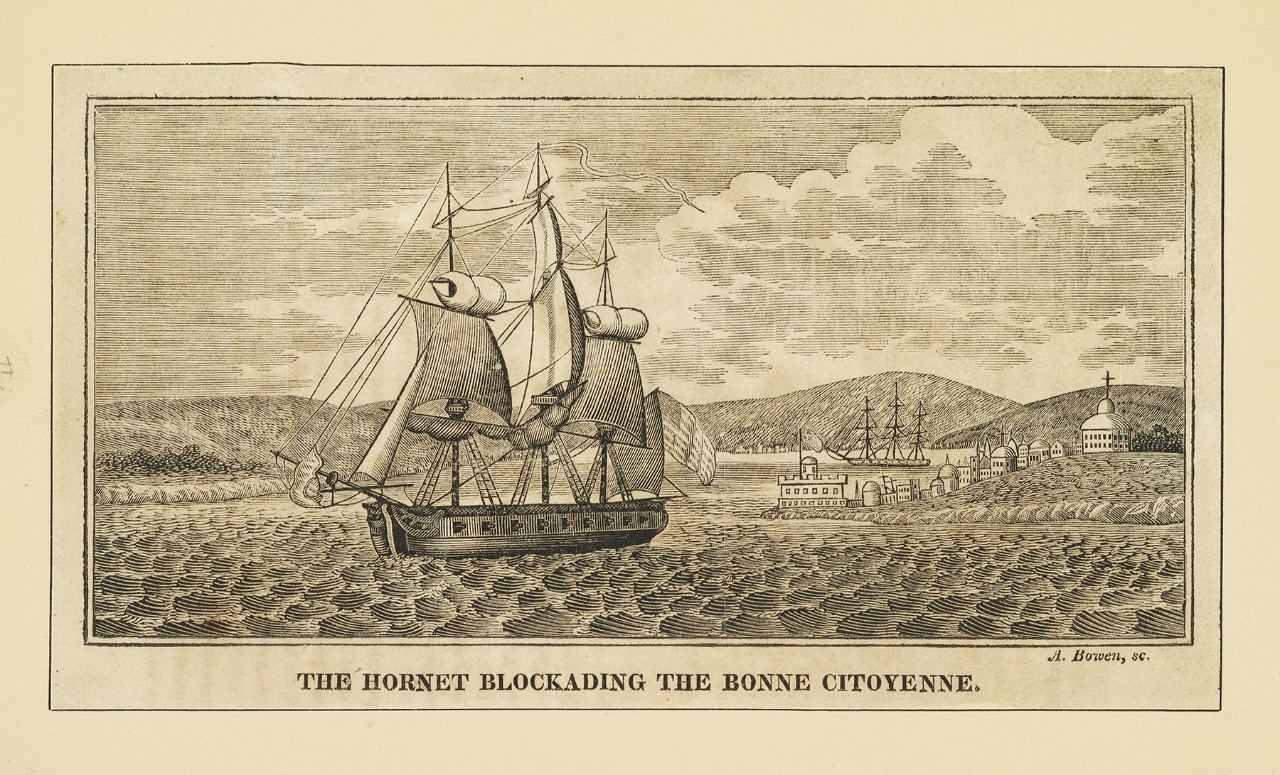
The Hornet blockading the Bonne Citoyenne

With the outbreak of the War of 1812 Greene took on a cargo of specie, worth some half a million pounds, and sailed from Rio de Janeiro. Unfortunately, a grounding damaged Bonne Citoyenne and he was forced to put into Salvador for repairs. Whilst she was in port, two American warships, the USS Constitution and USS Hornet arrived. James Lawrence of Hornet sent a challenge to Greene, offering a single ship combat, with Commodore William Bainbridge of Constitution pledging not to intervene in any way.

Bonne Citoyenne and Hornet were evenly matched in terms of the number of guns, weight of their broadsides, and sizes of their crews. In his reply, Greene stated that he expected that he would emerge the victor in such a contest, but that he could not expect Bainbridge and Constitution to forsake their duty to intervene should Bonne Citoyenne emerge the victor. Consequently, he declined the challenge at this time and place, but stated that he stood ready to accept the opportunity should the circumstances be different.

Constitution left on 6 January 1813, but Bonne Citoyenne did not sortie even though Hornet was now apparently alone. The arrival of the third rate Montagu on 24 January 1813 finally forced Hornet to leave; she sailed for the Caribbean where off the Demerara River she encountered and captured the sloop HMS Peacock, which subsequently sank. Greene sailed for Portsmouth on 26 January, arriving there in April. Bonne Citoyenne then returned to Jamaica, before again returning to Britain.

== Fate ==
In August 1814 or so Captain Augustus Clifford took command of Bonne Citoyenne. She was laid up in ordinary in January 1815. The Navy put her up for sale on 3 February 1819, and sold her on that day to Joshua Crystall for £1,550.
