= Coutts (1797 EIC ship) =

History

Great Britain
- Owner: Voyages 1–6: Sir Robert Preston; Voyages 7–8: Francis P Martin.
- Operator: British East India Company
- Builder: Randall, Rotherhithe
- Launched: 13 February 1797
- Fate: Broken up in 1815

General characteristics
- Type: East Indiaman
- Tons burthen: 1200 (chartered tonnage); 1451, or 145135/94, or 1504, (bm)
- Length: 176 ft 11 in (53.9 m) (overall); 114 ft 2 1/2 in (34.8 m) (keel)
- Beam: 43 ft 6 in (13.3 m)
- Depth of hold: 17 ft 6 in (5.3 m)
- Propulsion: Sail
- Complement: 1797:130; 1803:140; 1805:140; 1809:140
- Armament: 1797:30 × 12-pounder guns; 1803:32 × 12&6-pounder guns; 1805:32 × 12&6-pounder guns; 1809:32 × 12&6-pounder guns

Coutts was launched in 1797 and made eight voyages to India and China for the British East India Company (EIC). She participated in two notable engagements, the action of 4 August 1800, and the battle of Pulo Aura. She was broken up in 1815.

== Career ==
=== EIC voyage #1 (1797–98) ===
Captain Robert Torin (1760–1824), acquired a letter of marque on 28 March 1797. On 5 June he sailed from Portsmouth, bound for China. Coutts arrived at Whampoa Anchorage on 17 December. Homeward bound, she crossed the Second Bar on 14 February 1798, reached St Helena on 5 August, and arrived back at Gravesend on 22 October.

=== EIC voyage #2 (1800–01) ===
Captain Torin sailed from Torbay on 27 May 1800, bound for China.

Coutts was part of a convoy that also included Dorsetshire, Exeter, Bombay Castle, and Neptune, the Botany Bay ships Royal Admiral and Anne, and the whaler Seringapatam. Their escort was the small ship of the line HMS Belliqueux.

On the morning of 4 August they encountered French squadron consisting of the frigates Concorde, Médée, and Franchise. The French commander was concerned that he had encountered a fleet of powerful warships so he turned to escape. The British commander, Captain Rowley Bulteel, immediately ordered a pursuit. To preserve the impression of warships he also ordered four of his most powerful East Indiamen to join the chase. First Belliqueux captured Concorde. Exeter and Bombay Castle set out after Médée and succeeded in coming up with her after dark and tricking her into surrendering to what Médée thought was a ship of the line.

On 12 August Coutts was at Rio de Janeiro. From there she sailed to Santa Cruz, which she reached on 22 September. She arrived at Whampoa on 22 February 1801. Homeward bound, she crossed the Second Bar on 29 March, reached St Helena on 21 September, and arrived at Gravesend on 8 December.

=== EIC voyage #3 (1803–04) ===
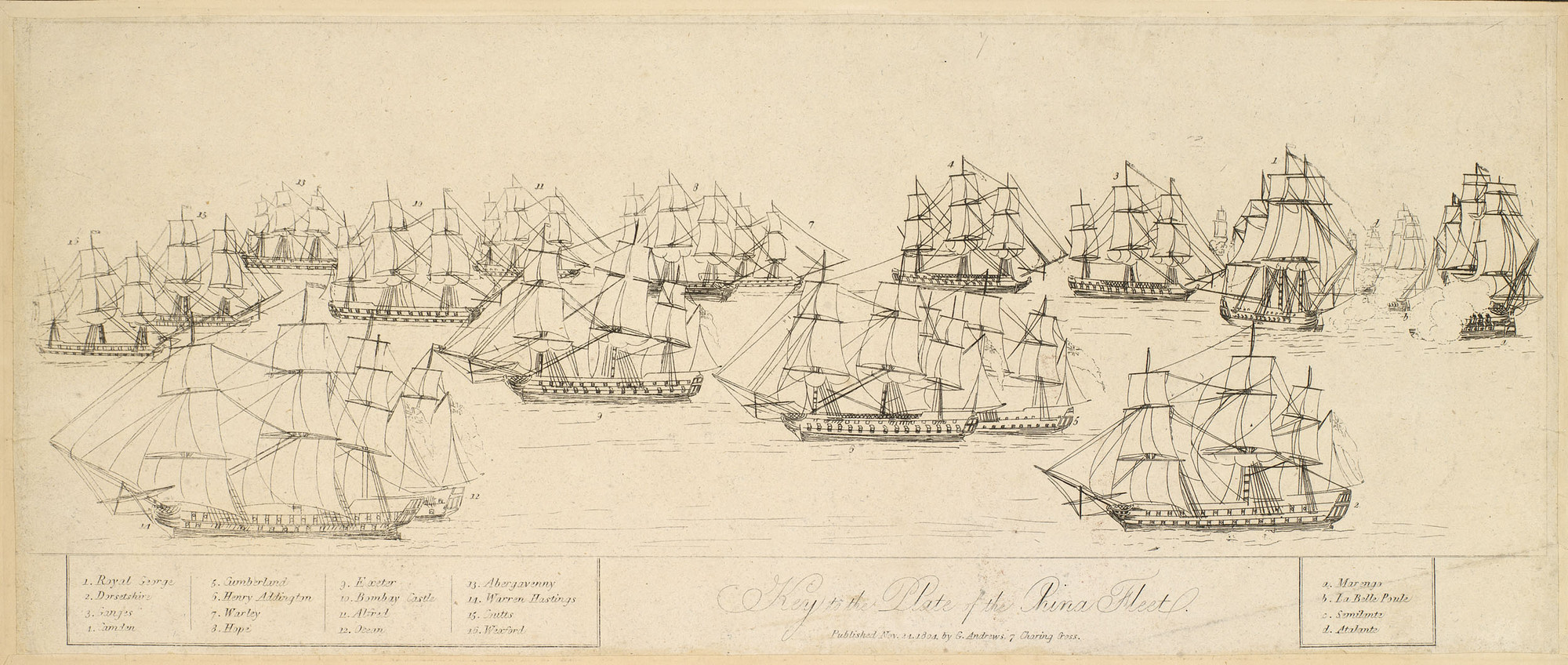
Coutts can be seen in this printed key for a view of the Battle, showing the China Fleet a painting by Francis Sartorius, the younger after a drawing by an officer on board the Henry Addington

After the commencement of the Napoleonic Wars, Captain Robert Torin required a new letter of marque, which he received in absentia on 20 June 1803, after he had sailed Coutts from the Downs on 6 May. Before she left for China, the artist John Constable sailed in her in April from London to Deal; Captain Torin was a friend of Constable's father. Coutts arrived at Whampoa on 1 October. Homeward bound, she crossed the Second Bar on 11 January 1804.

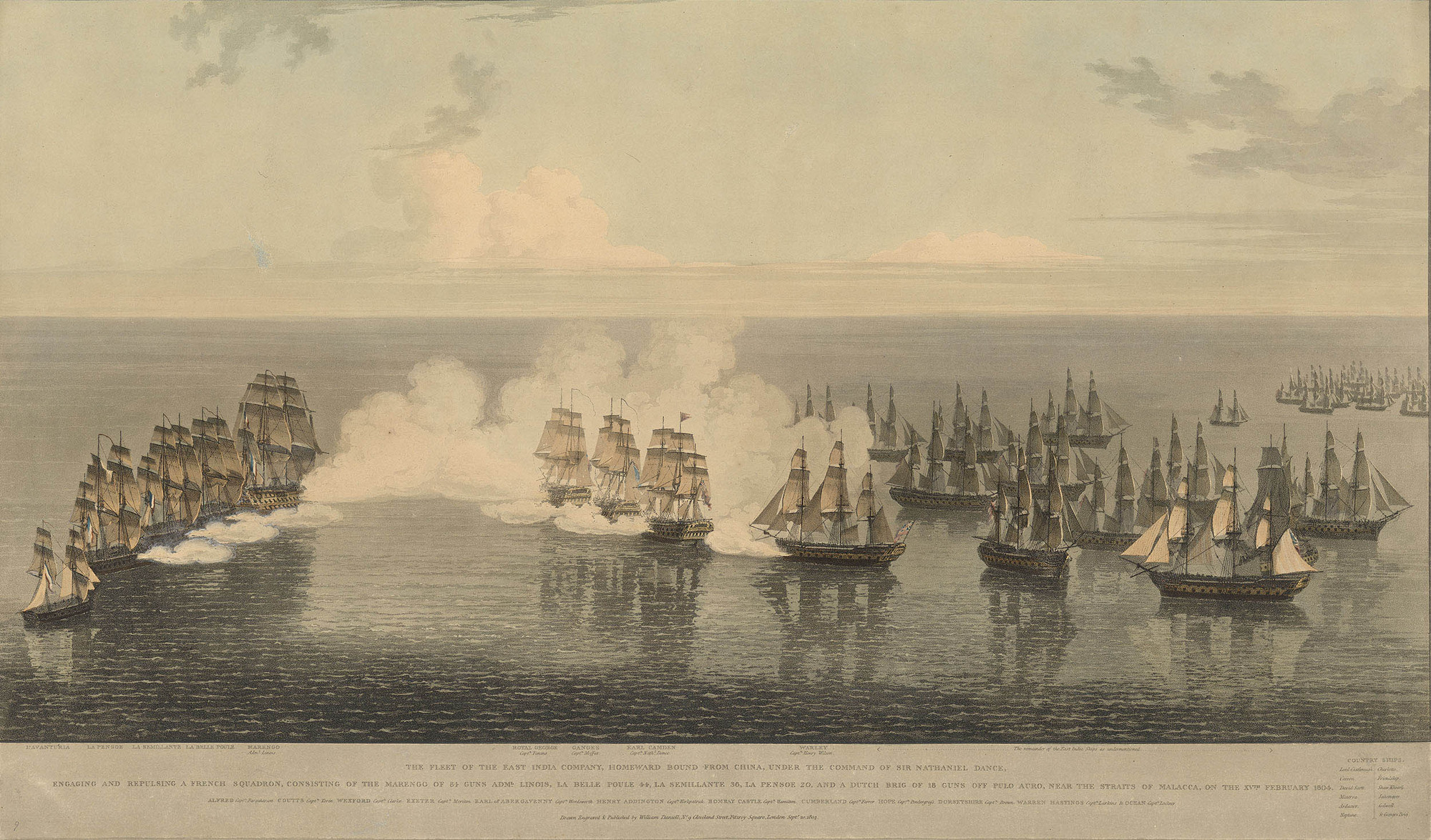
Commodore Dance's Indiamen (centre) protect the merchant fleet (right) and engage Admiral Linois's squadron (left) during the Battle of Pulo Aura, 1804. Painting by William Daniell

Coutts was one of the East Indiamen of the China Fleet that participated at the:

Coutts did not actually engage the French. She reached Malacca on 18 February and Penang on 1 March. She reached St Helena on 9 June, and arrived at Long Reach on 15 August. Plantagenet escorted the fleet from St Helena to England.

The EIC voted a £50,000 prize fund to be divided among the various commanders at the battle and their crews. Torin received 500 guineas, and a piece of plate worth 50 guineas. Each seaman received six guineas. Lloyd's Patriotic Fund and other national and mercantile institutions made a series of awards of ceremonial swords, silver plate, and monetary gifts to individual officers. Lloyd's Patriotic Fund gave each captain a sword worth £50, and one worth £100 to Nathaniel Dance, the Commodore of the China Fleet. Dance refused a baronetcy but was subsequently knighted.

=== EIC voyage #4 (1805–6) ===
Captain James Hay acquired a letter of marque on 27 February 1805. He sailed from Portsmouth on 25 April, bound for Madras and China. Coutts reached Madras on 25 August, Penang on 18 September, and Malacca on 22 October. She arrived at Whampoa on 24 December. Homeward bound, she crossed the Second Bar on 15 February 1806, and returned to Malacca on 18 March, and Penang on 28 March. She reached St Helena on 2 July and arrived at Long Reach on 6 September.

=== EIC voyage #5 (1807–08) ===
Captain Hay sailed from Portsmouth on 18 April 1807, bound for China. Coutts reached Penang on 14 September and Malacca on 22 October. She arrived at Whampoa on 28 December. Homeward bound she crossed the Second Bar on 11 February 1808, reached Penang on 4 April and St Helena on 10 July, and arrived at Long Reach on 14 September.

=== EIC voyage #6 (1809–10) ===
Captain John Boyce acquired a letter of marque on 17 February 1809. He sailed from Portsmouth on 5 April, bound for China. Coutts arrived reached Penang on 22 July and Malacca on 27 August, before arriving at Whampoa on 5 November. Homeward bound, she crossed the Second Bar on 22 December, left China on 4 March 1810, reached St Helena on 22 May, and arrived at Long Reach on 2 August.

=== EIC voyage #7 (1812–13) ===
Captain Boyce sailed from Torbay on 4 January 1812, bound for Mumbai and China. Coutts arrived at Bombay on 8 May. She reached Penang on 13 July and Malacca on 25 July, before arriving at Whampoa on 12 September. Homeward bound, she crossed the Second Bar on 5 December, reached St Helena on 28 March 1813, and arrived at Long Reach on 8 June.

=== EIC voyage #8 (1814–15) ===
Captain Boyce sailed from Portsmouth on 9 April 1814, bound for China. Coutts reached Penang on 15 August, Malacca on 15 September, and Lintin on 22 October. She arrived at Whampoa on 10 December. Homeward bound, she crossed the Second Bar on 22 January 1815, reached St Helena on 13 May, and arrived at Long Reach on 24 August.

== Fate ==
In 1815 Coutts was sold for breaking up.
