= Gun port =

Opening on the side of a ship's hull

Example of a typical gun port of a 36-pounder battery on a 19th-century ship. The lid is half open, and features an observation window and a ventilation opening, shown half-opened. It opens by pulling two chains that run from the top of the lid and through the hull, and closes by pulling chains running from below the lid and through the gun port. The lid itself has two layers: an inner layer made of vertical planks, providing structural integrity and watertightning, and an outer layer made of horizontal planks that integrates into the outer hull. A short roof above the gun port offers some protection from the elements, and prevents the lid from jamming against the hull.

A gunport is an opening in the side of the hull of a ship, above the waterline, which allows the muzzle of artillery pieces mounted on the gun deck to fire outside. The origin of this technology is not precisely known, but can be traced back to the late 15th century, with the appearance of artillery in naval warfare. Ships featuring gunports were said to be pierced, since the ports were cut through the hull after the construction.

== History ==
=== Origin ===
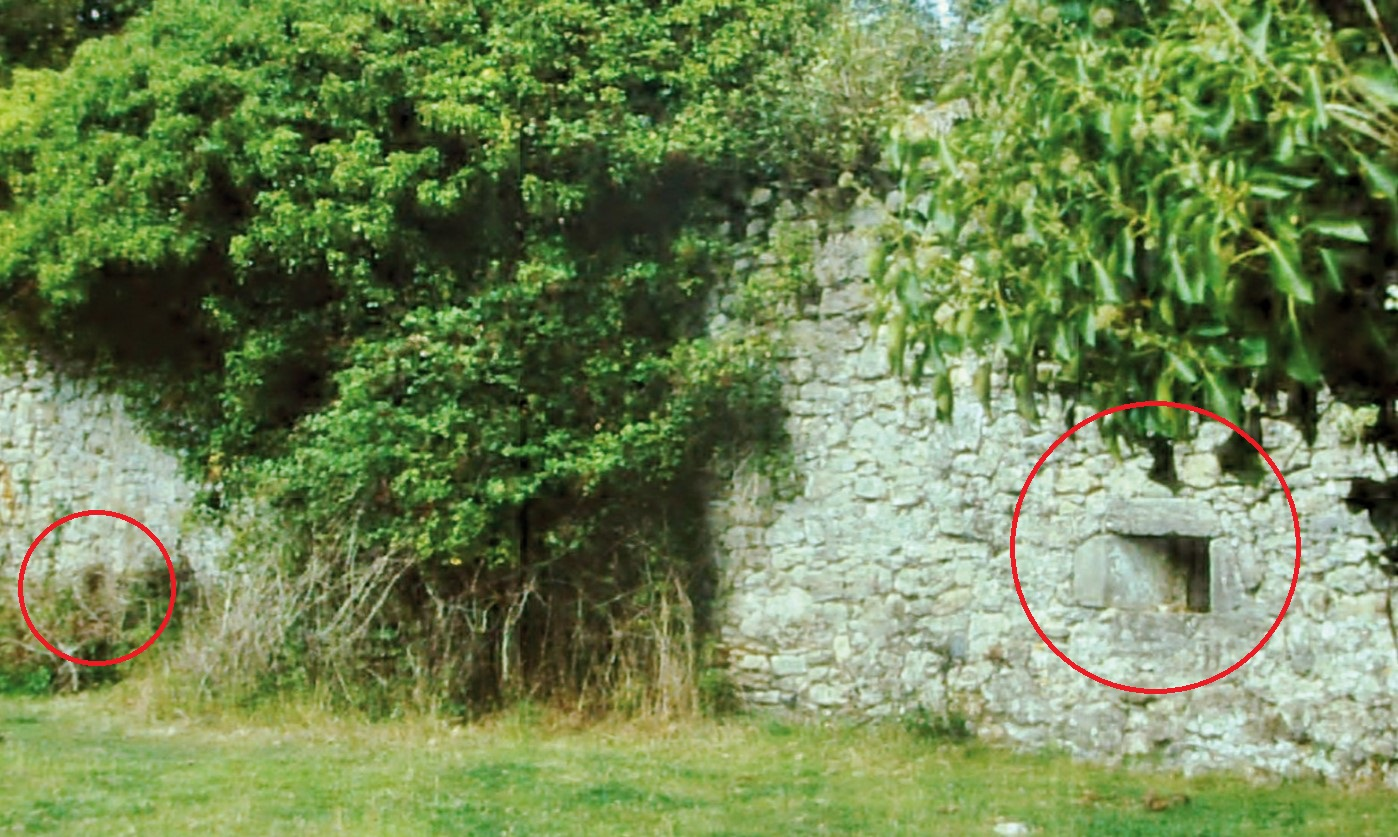
Primitive gun ports (circled) cut into the walls of Quarr Abbey in 1365

The origin of the gunport is difficult to specify. In France, it has often been attributed to François Descharges (or Deschenges), a master carpenter in Brest in 1501; this is now known to be incorrect, since the ships of this era had long since adopted guns as their main armament. Examples of earlier occurrence are a 1498 terra cotta tile featuring a Portuguese caravel pierced with gunports; a relation of the Siege of Rhodes, printed in Ulm in 1496, that mentions a ship with 10 gunports; and a text that mentions that during the Conquest of the Canary Islands, Isabelle of Canary was thrown overboard through the gunport of Béthencourt's ship.

Portuguese sources attribute the invention to King John II of Portugal (1455–1495), who decided to arm his caravels with heavy cannons, thus creating the first modern man-of-war. The first experiments with the new weapons were made in Setuvel (modern Setúbal) south of Lisbon around 1490; small ships armed in this way could confront much larger vessels armed with the usual small swivel guns.

Guns had been mounted in ships since the 14th century. By 1386, naval artillery had progressed enough for Jean Froissart to report a large ship "armed with three guns that threw such large quarrels that wherever they fell, they pierced everything and caused great damage". In 1380, during the War of Chioggia, Luciano Doria was killed aboard his ship by an enemy broadside. In 1340, during the Battle of Sluys, several of the French carracks bore guns powerful enough to sink several English ships. But these guns were mounted in the ship's castles or in swivels, much in the way they were still mounted in the castles of the galleys at the Battle of Lepanto in 1571.

The power of a cannon depends on its calibre and its range, which in turn impact its weight. The first artillery pieces used in naval combat, traced back to 1304, were light enough to be mounted on the forecastle, in line with the tactics of the time, which favoured attacks facing the bow the enemy. However, improvements in guns from the mid-14th century dictated an increase in weight, forcing ships to mount them low on the hull for stability; piercing gunports had therefore grown into a common practice by 1501.

Some historians claim the invention was probably simultaneous in Portugal, Spain, England, France and Holland. It was made possible by the increased size of ship hulls, which allowed piercing ports high enough that they would not take in seawater; nevertheless, the ports had to close with lids in heavy seas, and making them watertight was a technical challenge at the time.

=== Age of Sail ===
==== Technique ====
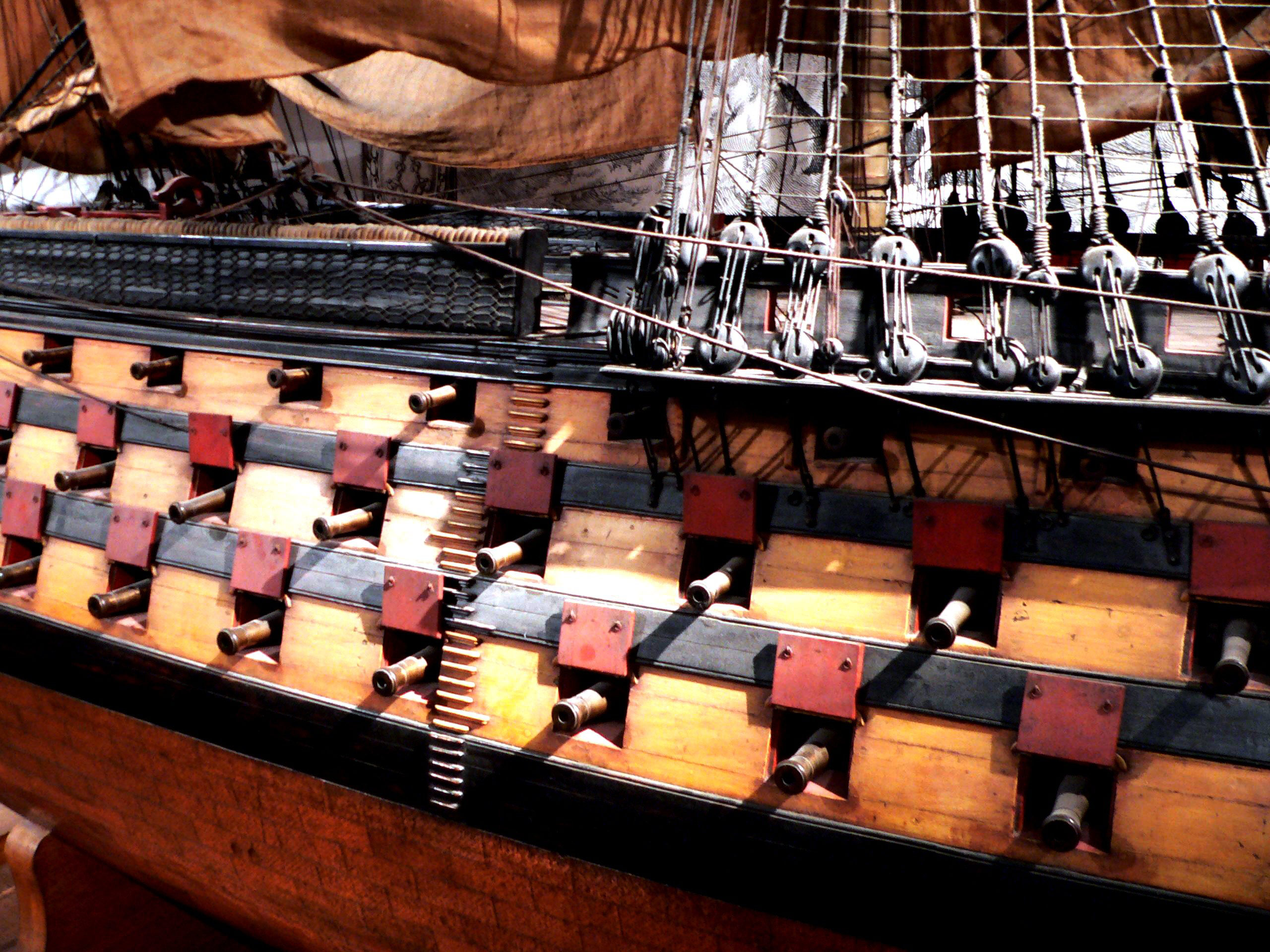
Broadside of the Océan, showing the quincunx disposition of the gunport across superposed gun decks.

The gunport makes it possible to mount large artillery pieces on a ship, turning it into an efficient artillery platform. From the 15th century, the number and quality of the artillery, conditioned by the gunports, became one of the features that distinguished warships from merchantmen. It announced the advent of the ship of the line and the demise of the galleys, which carried only a few guns on their forecastle. From the 16th century, the number and disposition of the artillery dictated the evolution of the silhouette of the ships, whose forecastle and quarterdeck faded and eventually disappeared entirely in the 19th century.

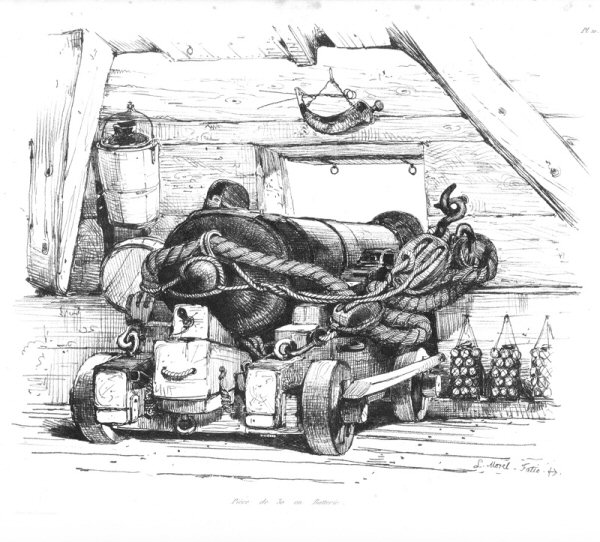
Gun port of a 36-pounder long gun.

Gunports were pierced on the side of the hull at equal intervals of 2.4 to 2.7 metres, though some were also pierced at the bow and at the stern of ships, for chase guns. Their size was adapted to the calibre of the artillery: for instance a gunport for a 36-pounder long gun was 1.2 metre wide. On ships with several decks, they were never pierced one on top of the other, but in quincunx, as to better distribute the load of the guns and the weaknesses of the hull. They were not mere holes in the hull, but artillery positions that had to withstand the weight of the cannons and the recoil forces of shots; to this end, they featured strong beams and rings to which the complex rigging that held the guns in place were attached. In effect, naval guns mounted behind gunports were more comparable to the guns installed in latter turrets, than to mobile Army field guns.

Georges Fournier describes that in 1643, gunports closed with a top-mounted lid mounted in France, England and Holland, while they closed with side-mounted doors in Spain, and with removable panels in other countries. Some ships built with clinker, such as the Mary Rose, had to be rebuilt with a freeboard to be pierced.

Gunports also provided aeration to the cluttered ships. To this end, it was possible to either open the lid, like when bearing the guns, or to open a smaller door in the lid.

Three views of a carronade with its double-lid gun port.

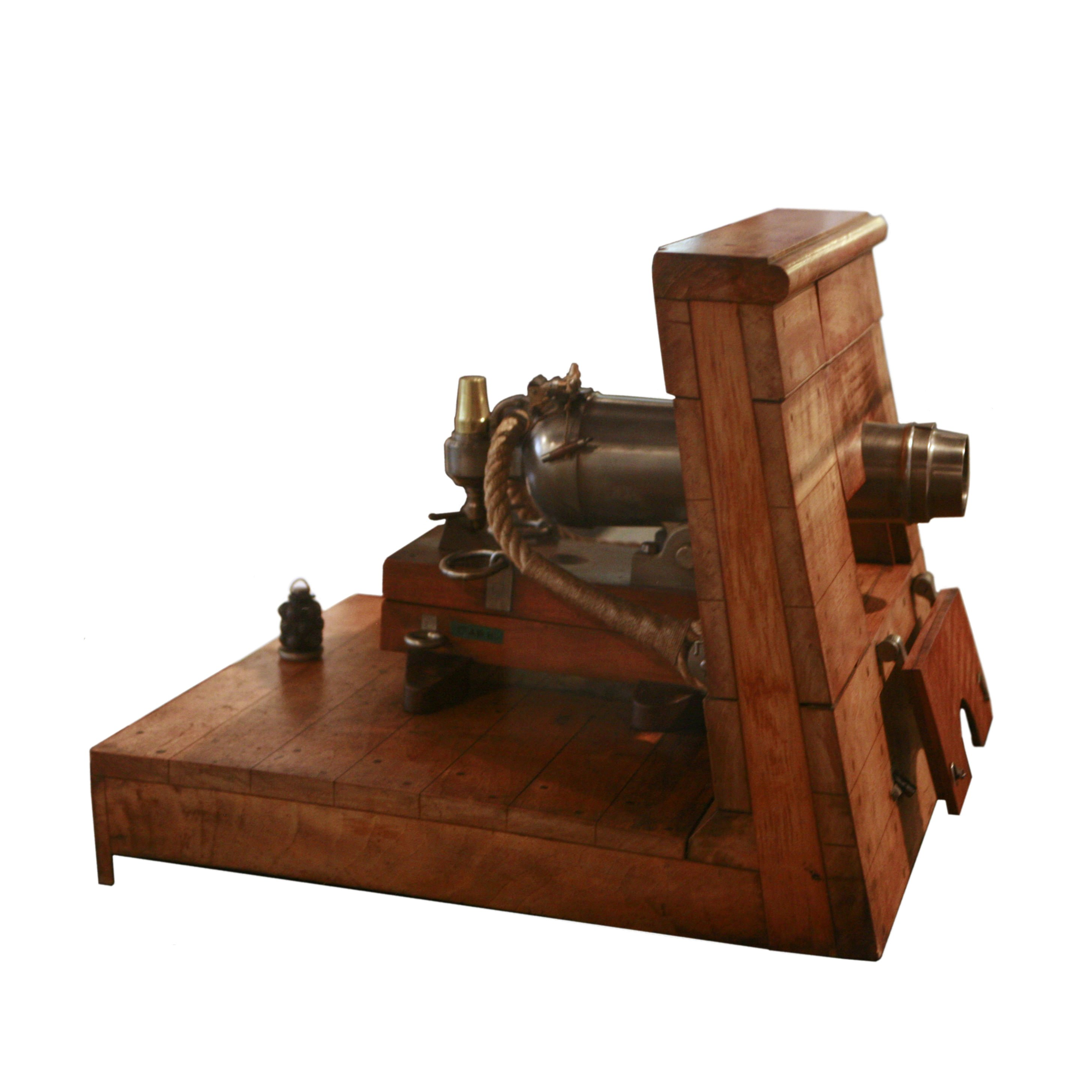

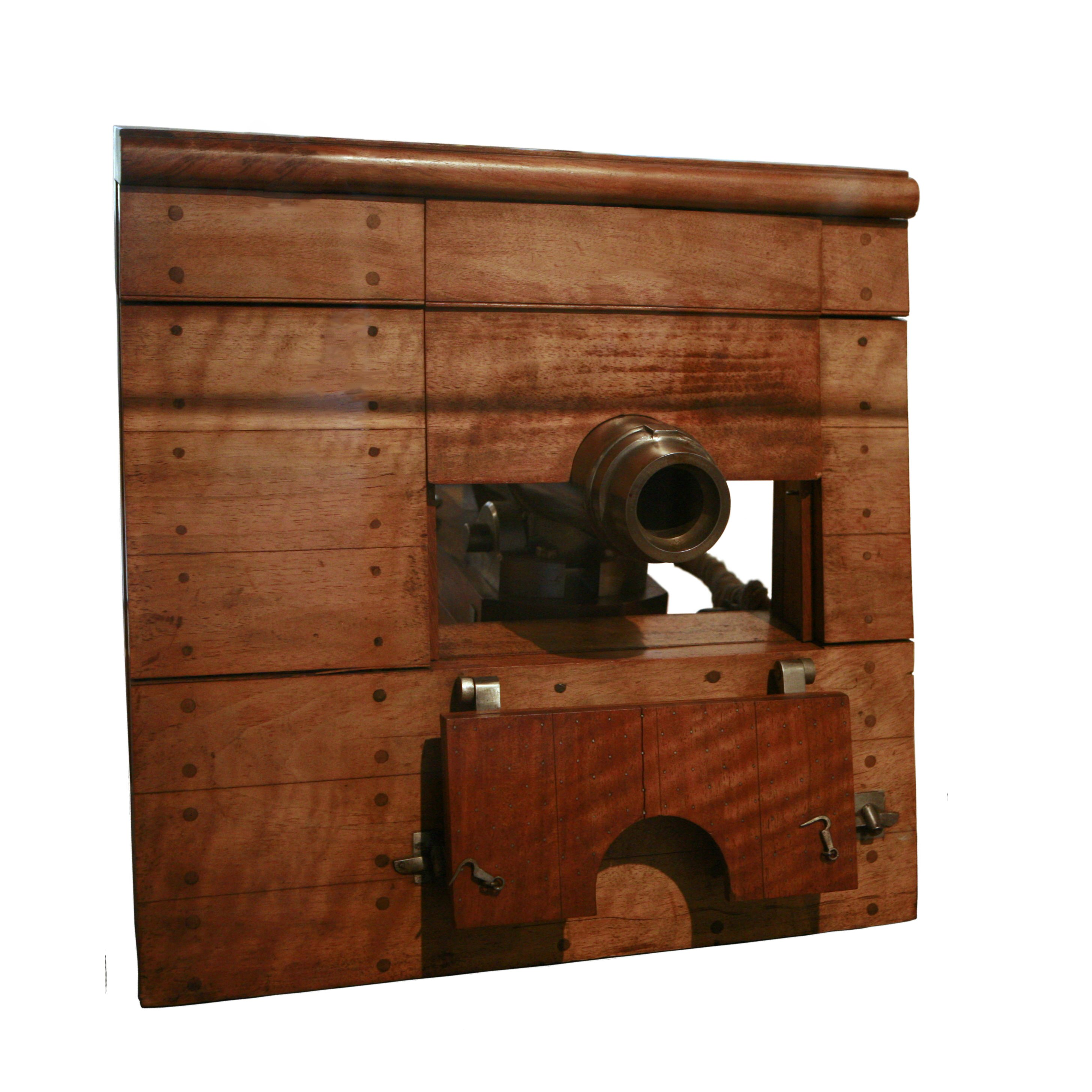

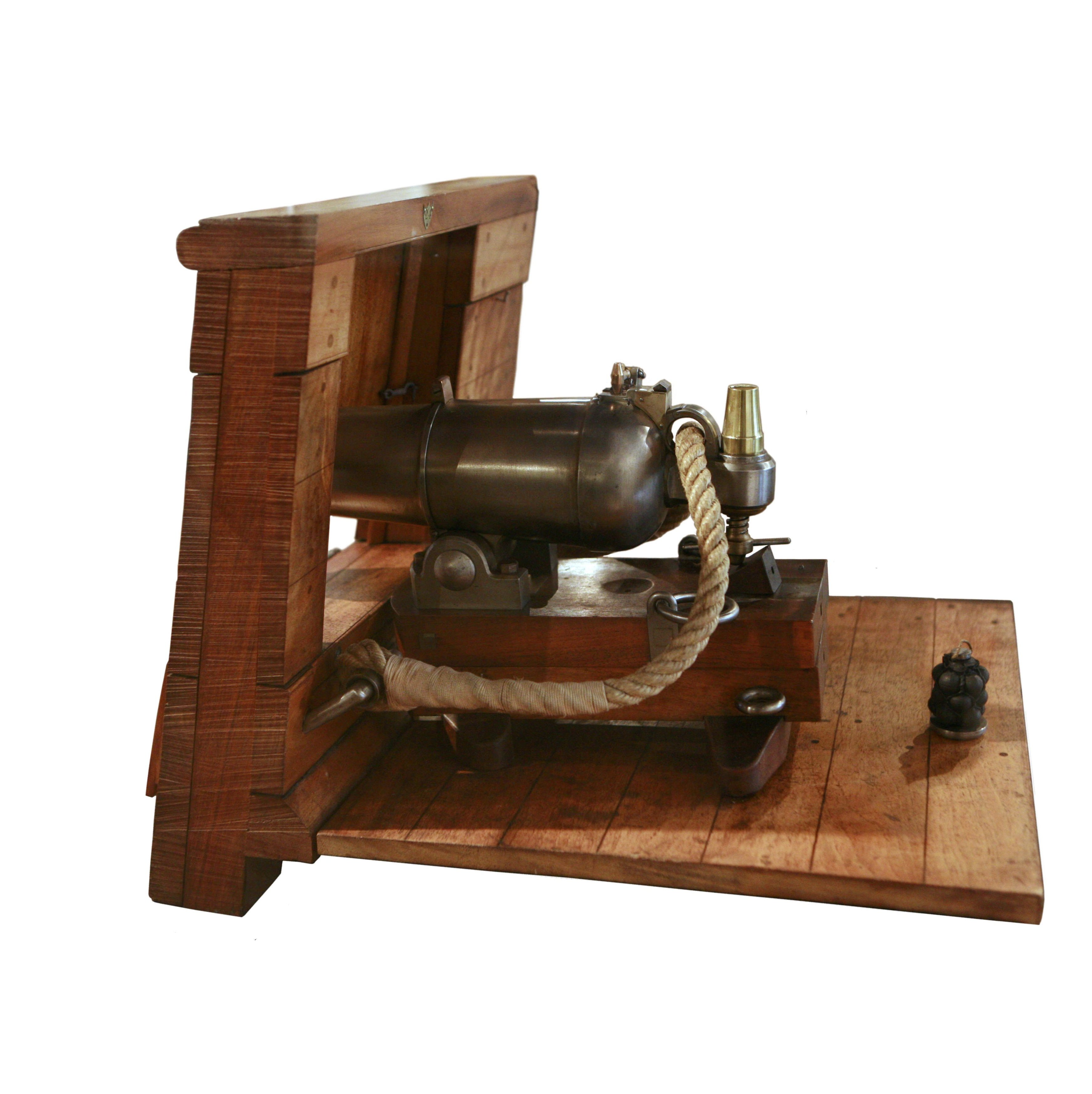

==== Flooding danger ====
In heavy sea, the gunports of the lower battery had to be closed, lest sea water flood the gun deck. The lower ports were a recurrent flooding risk, and caused a number of shipwrecks, like the Mary Rose in 1545 and the Vasa in 1628 (these ships also suffered from poor stability due to excessive weight in their tops) which sank when sudden gusts of wind made them list and lowered their opened lower gunports under the level of the sea. During the Battle of Quiberon Bay, two French ships of the line, Thésée and Superbe, foundered for a similar reason. The loss of Vengeur du Peuple and the Third Battle of Ushant was also probably caused by seawater flooding from the lower battery, whose gunport lids had been ripped off and shattered in the collision and subsequent gunnery exchange with HMS Brunswick.

The French term for "scuttling", "sabordage", comes from "sabord" ("gunport"), reflecting their potential for flooding.

==== Tactics ====
Considerations of flooding had tactical implications. For instance, at the Battle of Ushant in 1778, the French squadron initially gained the initiative by sailing windwards from the British; however, as the sea strengthened, the French, whose ships were listing in the direction of the enemy, had to close their lower gunports, thereby losing their heaviest artillery and a significant fraction of their broadside; since the British were on a parallel course, their list was opposed to their enemy, and they could bring all their guns to bear.

On 17 February 1783, the two-decker HMS Argo found herself unable to use her lower battery when two French frigates intercepted her. Similarly, during the action of 13 January 1797, the French 74-gun ship of the line Droits de l'Homme fought the British frigates Indefatigable and Amazon in a sea so heavy that she had to seal her lower battery, leaving her with only 30 18-pounder guns, which effectively reduced her to the fighting qualities of a frigate; the British frigates, with their higher freeboard, remained free to use their full potential, and eventually forced the 74-gun to beach herself, even though they would not have been a match for a ship of the line in normal conditions.

In the 18 and 19th centuries, merchantmen featured gunports, as they were useful to ventilate the ship and lighten the deck, and allowed to arm some merchantmen as warship in case of necessity; for instance, after the Mississippi Company was bankrupt in 1770, all its possessions were transferred to the Crown, and its ships were commissioned in the French Royal Navy. Furthermore, some warships could be armed en flûte, removing guns from some of the gunports to make room for storage and men. This could make it non-trivial to discriminate ships in naval service from those that sailed for commerce. In the action of 4 August 1800, the large East Indiaman Exeter passed herself as a 74-gun ship of the line when she chased the much stronger French frigate Médée; after sunset, she perfected the illusion by opening and illuminating all her gunports, whether armed or not; her appearance was so convincing that when she caught up with Médée, the frigate struck as if hopelessly overpowered. Conversely, in several instances, frigates attacked what they believed to be merchantmen, only to find themselves unexpectedly confronted with warships; for instance, this mistake caused the capture of the frigate Forte by HMS Sibylle on 2 March 1799.

==== Other use ====
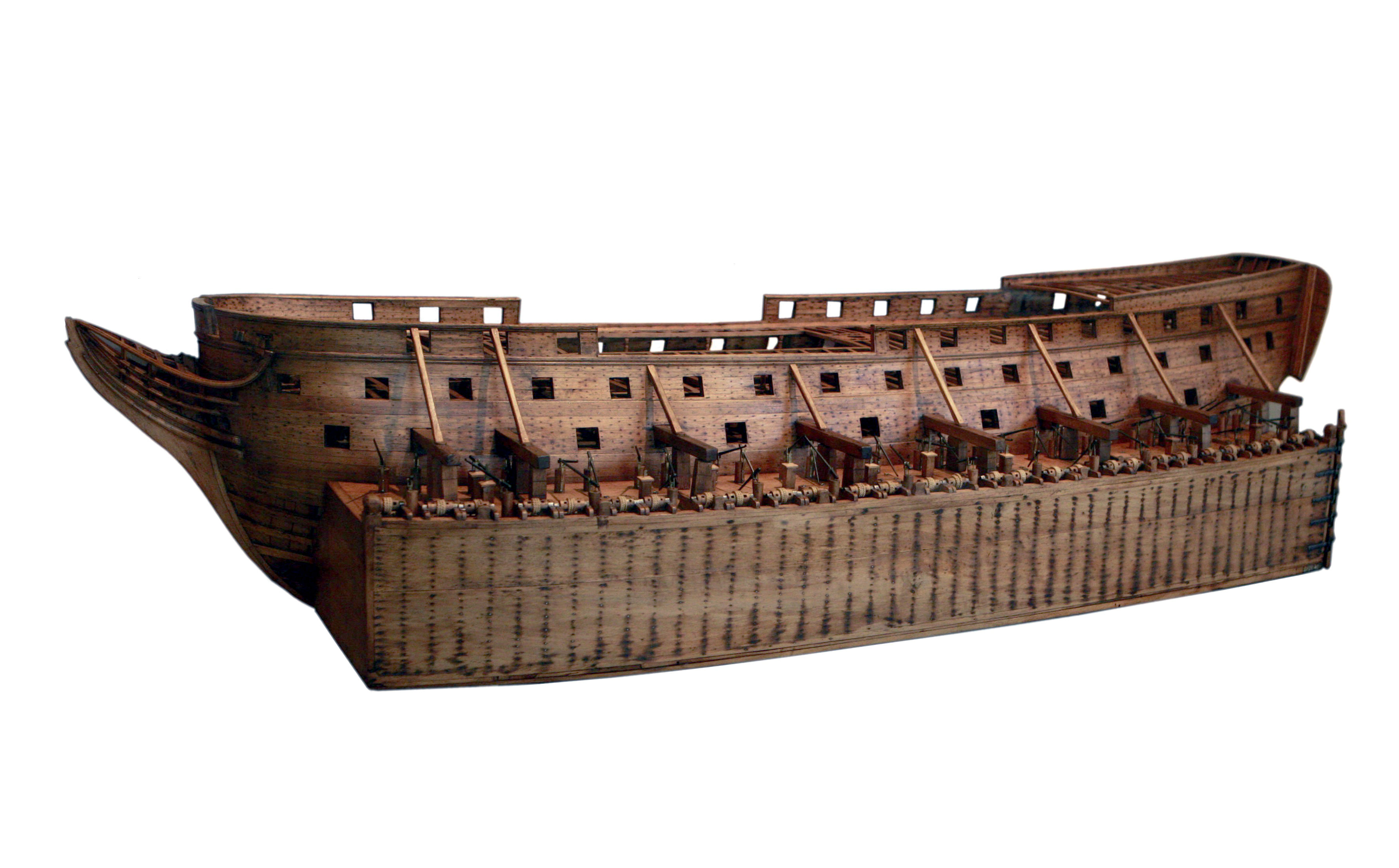
A Téméraire class ship of the line supported by chameaux inserted in the gun ports.

Gunports could be used for a variety of purposes, beginning by loading or unloading supply, as emergency exit, or to board a ship.

Around 1810, the French built several 74-gun ships in Venice harbour, which was deep enough to launch the ships, but too shallow to allow their departure. To reduce their draught, the ships were equipped with flotation tanks that supported them with beams inserted into their gunports. This system, called "chameau" ("camel"), was used by two ships: Rivoli and Mont Saint-Bernard. Access number 27 CN 42 at the Naval museum of Toulon.

=== Later years ===
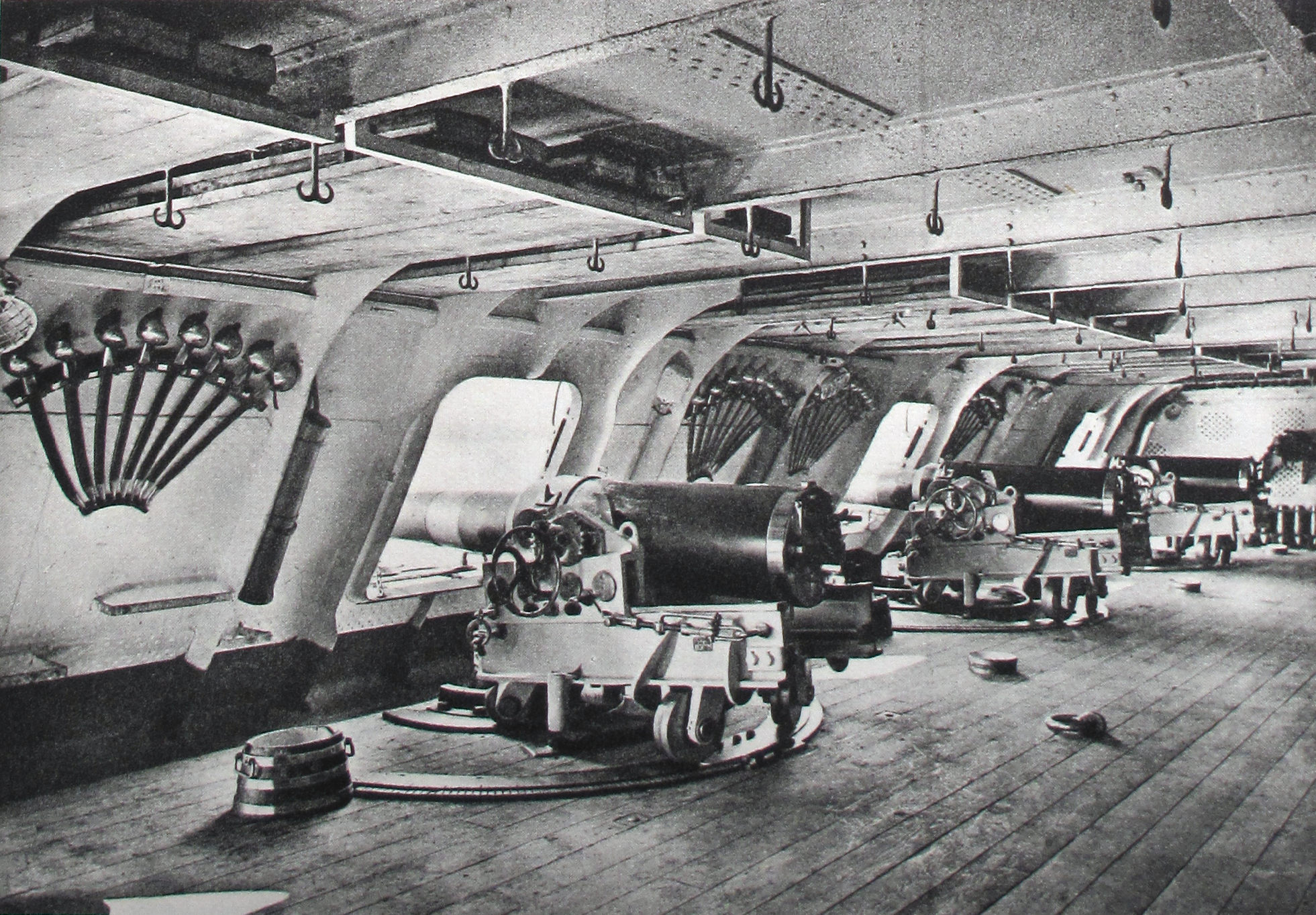
14 cm. guns in the battery of an ironclad.

Around the mid-19th century, the development of larger artillery pieces, like the Paixhans gun, led to mounting large guns on the deck of warships. For some time, on armoured frigates, batteries mounted behind gunports coexisted with these heavy guns, but they gradually lost ground against the barbette, where the gun was mounted on a rotating platform on the deck, possibly with a partial shielding, and eventually against the gun turret. The Battle of Hampton Roads, where the turret USS Monitor had the upper hand against the battery CSS Virginia, announced this trend.

The philosophy of the gunport survived for a time with the central battery ship and the casemates of the secondary batteries of pre-dreadnought and dreadnought battleships, which were intended to repulse torpedo boats.

== See also ==
- Embrasure
- Firing port

== Notes and references ==
=== Source and bibliography ===
- Vergé-Franceschi, Michel (2002). Dictionnaire d'Histoire maritime. Paris: Robert Laffont. ISBN 2-221-08751-8.
- Le Moing, Guy (2011). Les 600 plus grandes batailles navales de l'Histoire. Marines Éditions. ISBN 978-2-35743-077-8.
- Meyer, Jean; Acerra, Martine (1994). Histoire de la marine française : des origines à nos jours. Rennes: éditions Ouest-France. ISBN 2-7373-1129-2.
- Resende, Garcia (1545). Vida e feitos d' el-rey Dom João Segundo.
