= Lady Shore (1794 ship) =

Ship of the United Kingdom

History

United Kingdom
- Name: Lady Shore
- Namesake: Charlotte Shore, wife of Sir John Shore
- Owner: James Willcocks
- Builder: Calcutta
- Launched: 6 January 1794
- Notes: This vessel is frequently conflated with Lady Shore (1793 ship)

General characteristics
- Tons burthen: 482
- Sail plan: Ship rigged
- Complement: 35
- Armament: 10 × 4- & 6-pounder guns; Other source: 22 guns

Lady Shore was a merchantman launched at Calcutta in 1794. In 1797, she commenced a voyage as a convict ship to Australia until a mutiny cut the voyage short.

== Early career ==
Lady Shore was launched by James Willcocks, Calcutta, in 1794, for his own account. He was also her master. (Note: Hackman conflates this vessel with the Lady Shore launched at Calcutta in 1803.) Lady Shore was admitted to Registry in Britain on 19 January 1797.

== Mutiny ==
Under the command of James Willcocks, Lady Shore sailed from Gravesend, England, in May 1797, with cargo, 58 soldiers for the New South Wales Corps, and 119 prisoners. (Note: The number and sex of the prisoners is in some dispute. Some accounts suggest that Lady Shore carried only 66 women convicts and two male. Others give the breakdown as 44 men and 75 prostitutes. The Belfast Journal gave her complement as 110 men, women, and children of the Corps, and 70 convicts, only two of whom were males, Major Semple, and Knowles, the Duke of Portland's late porter.) She sailed under a letter of marque dated 3 April that gave her crew as 35, her size as 482 tons (bm), and her armament as 10 guns. However, she had a crew of only 26 when she departed.

Amongst the prisoners were Sélis and Thierry, French prisoners of war from the capture of the corvette Bonne Citoyenne on 10 March 1796. Sélis had been chief helmsman of the corvette, and Thierry was a pilot. They had already made two escape attempts with fellow prisoners. On 28 March 1797, Sélis and Thierry and six other former escapees were embarked on Lady Shore, bound for Botany Bay.

Once aboard, the French decided that their only means of escape was to seize the ship. To this end, they recruited fellow prisoners, three Germans and one Spaniard. In addition to Sélis and Thierry, the mutineers were Laurèche, Delehay, Malleo, Mallicot, Le Garshe, Lockart, Crippong, Greville, Wolfe, and Jean Prevost (Prevôt). They planned carefully, with each man having a specific task during the takeover.

On 1 August 1797, at 2a.m., the prisoners crept into the sentries' station while the sentries slept and seized the sentries' weapons. At a signal, the shout of "Vive la République!" ("Long live the Republic!"), the mutineers ran to take their fighting positions: one controlled the hatch to the women's quarters; two, the hatch of the quarters where the soldiers slept, threatening to kill anyone trying to get out; two covered the deck and were to shoot any sailor or soldier present there who would not surrender; two controlled the hatch of the officers' quarters; two were to arrest the captain; two were to seize the three officers on deck and prevent them from giving alarm; and the last one would open an ammunition box, distribute it to his fellow mutineers, and patrol to prevent anyone from flanking them.

Seeing two armed mutineers running about, the chief mate, Lambert, fired and mortally wounded Delehay, but was himself killed immediately. Captain Willcocks attempted to resist, but received three bayonet wounds, perhaps from Prevost. Willcocks died two days later. Soldiers attempted to climb on deck, but the men on the hatches repelled them. The French then proceeded to seal the hatches, disarm the crew, and put Sélis and Thierry in command of the ship. The British officers had to sign the certificate of seizure that was the custom when a prize was taken at war. The French recruited some of their prisoners to help sail the ship: seven Irishmen, Conden, Keaning, Lynch, M'Ginnis, Keating, Kelly, and Sheridan; and four Englishmen: Church, New, Deviling, and Pyott.

The mutineers elected Sélis Captain and Thierry Lieutenant. Sélis and Thierry wrote regulations threatening death to any Frenchman colluding with the British or talking of surrender in case of an encounter at sea, and any British caught with weapons or fomenting another mutiny; and fifty lashes for anyone speaking ill of the Republic. These regulations were translated into English and posted all over the ship.

On 14 August, around 1 p.m., fearing that such a large quantity of prisoners would be difficult to control, the mutineers singled out some of the officers and soldiers (the second and third mates, the lieutenant commanding the army detachment, an ensign, two sergeants, two corporals and two privates); after having them pledge not to fight against France and her allies for one year and a day, the French provided them with navigation instruments and food, and cast them adrift in a longboat off the coasts of Brazil, with their wives and children, as well as four convicts, for a total of 29 people. The longboat safely reached the shore the next day in the afternoon.

Lady Shore then sailed to Montevideo; she arrived on 31 August, hoisted the French colours, and saluted the commanding ship with 11 cannon shots, and the harbour with 15. Initially, the Spanish contested the validity of the capture. They came aboard, removed all the prisoners and arrested the three Germans and seven French. After Sélis and Thierry protested to the Viceroy, and sought support from the French ambassador, Laurent Jean François Truguet, the Spanish released the French prisoners. It was not until a French frigate squadron under Captain Landolphe, comprising Médée, Franchise and Concorde, sailed into the harbour, that the Spanish acknowledged their authority over the ship and the prisoners.

== Fate ==
HMS Tremendous may have recaptured Lady Shore in 1801. Corroborating evidence is scarce. There is a general mention that the Royal Navy recaptured her and took her to Cape Town. Lloyd's List reported in June 1801 that Lady Shore and Chesterfield had been recaptured near the River Plata and taken into Cape Town. Her subsequent fate is obscure.

== Postscript ==
The men and women in the longboat eventually made their way to Rio de Janeiro and then to Britain, in some cases via Lisbon.

The Spanish retained the female convicts, distributing them as servants among the ladies of the city. Some of the convict women became prostitutes. Some behaved well and ended up married and settled. Those who behaved in a "loose and disorderly manner" were imprisoned; eventually they converted to Roman Catholicism and reformed their ways.

In November 1799, a Bow Street Officer arrived in London from Portsmouth with Jean Sanlard, alias Provost, and Jean Baptiste Escala. They had been captured aboard a French frigate in the West Indies. Prevost was arrested for having assaulted and murdered "Wilcox". He was tried and hanged.

In 1804, four Englishmen were captured on board several Spanish vessels. Three turned out to be members of the New South Wales Corps, who claimed not to have been part of the mutiny, and one was Lancelot Knowles. The Spanish authorities held them as prisoners of war at Buenos Aires. They had recently been freed and were being sent to Spain for onward transfer to England when they were captured.

== See also ==
- John Black (privateer), gives a more detailed account of the mutiny.
