= HMS Furieuse =

Frigate of the Royal Navy

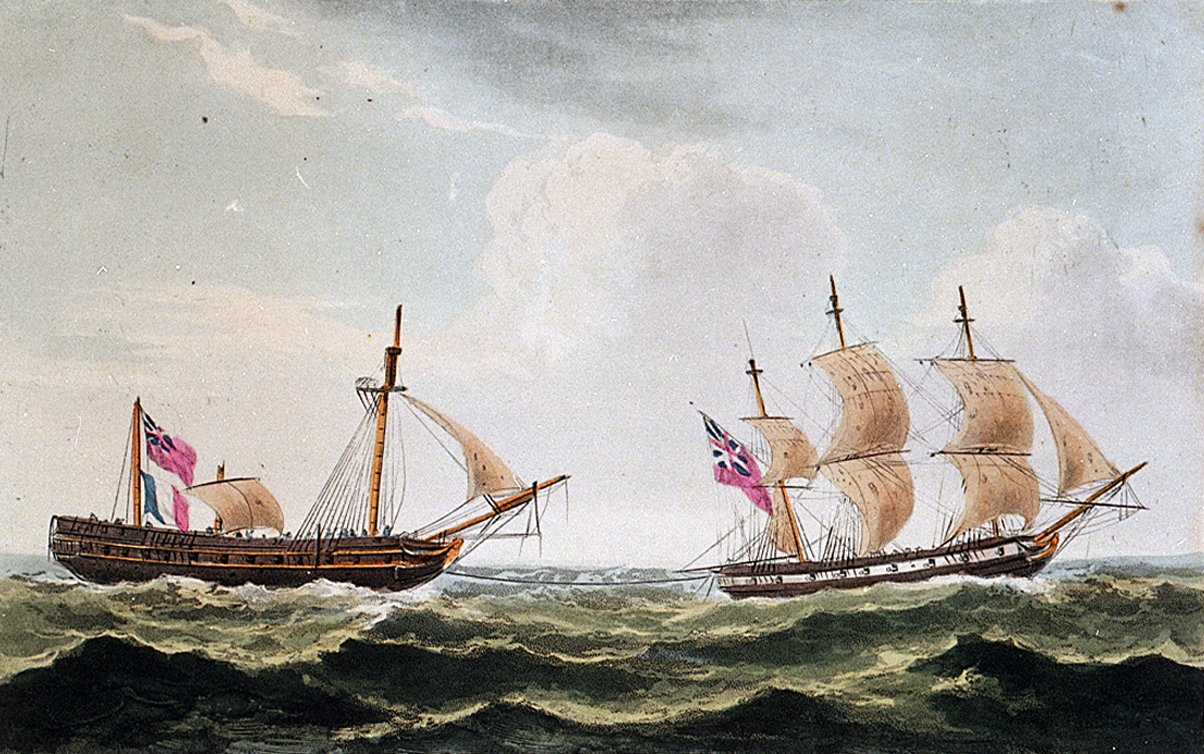
- Furieuse (left) being taken in tow by HMS Bonne Citoyenne following her capture

History

France
- Name: Furieuse
- Builder: Cherbourg
- Laid down: 23 March 1795
- Launched: 22 September 1797
- Captured: By the Royal Navy on 6 July 1809

United Kingdom
- Name: HMS Furieuse
- Acquired: 6 July 1809
- Fate: Broken up in October 1816

General characteristics
- Class & type: 38-gun fifth-rate Seine-class frigate
- Displacement: 1311 tonneaux
- Tons burthen: 700 port tonneaux; 1083 13/94 (bm)
- Length: 157 ft 3 in (47.93 m)
- Beam: 39 ft 1 in (11.91 m)
- Draught: 12 ft 6 in (3.81 m)
- Sail plan: Full-rigged ship
- Complement: 284
- Armament: En flûte: 12 × 42-pounder carronades + 2 × 24-pounder guns + 6 guns of smaller calibre; British service; Upper deck: 26 × 18-pounder guns; QD: 12 × 32-pounder carronades; Fc: 2 × 12-pounder guns, 2 × 32-pounder carronades, 1 × 18-pounder carronade, 1 × 12-pounder carronade

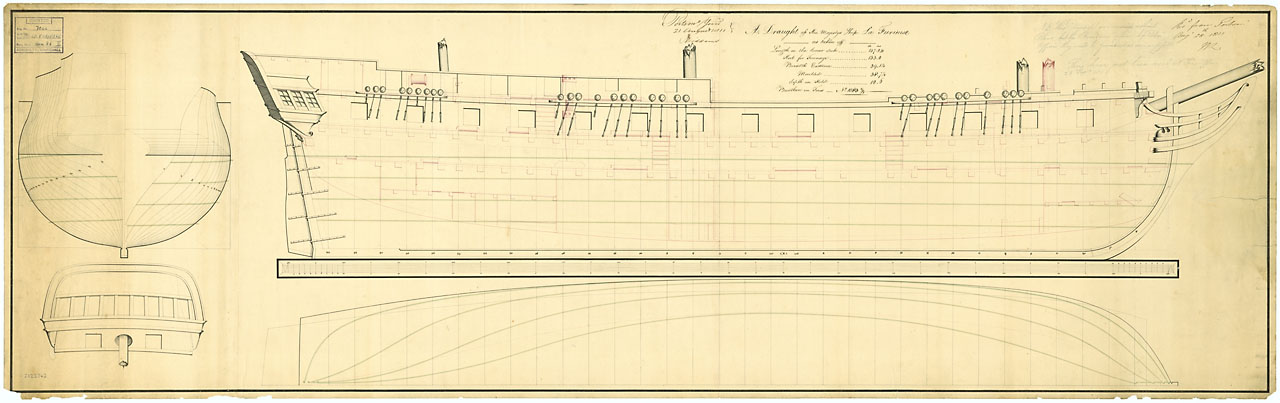
Furieuse

Furieuse was a 38-gun frigate of the French Navy. The Royal Navy captured her in 1809 and took her into service as the fifth rate HMS Furieuse. She spent most of her British career in the Mediterranean Sea, though towards the end of the War of 1812 she served briefly on the North American station. She was laid up in 1815 and sold for breaking up in 1816.

== French career and capture ==
Furieuse was built at Cherbourg in 1795 to a design by Pierre-Alexandre Forfait. She began as a Romaine-class frigate but was completed as a Seine-class frigate. (Note: The Romaine-class frigates were originally designed as frégates-bombarde, carrying a main armament of twenty 24-pounder guns and a 12-inch mortar. The concept proved impractical and the French Navy removed the mortars.)

By 1809 Furieuse was in the Caribbean, having come out with Admiral Amable Troude's expedition to the Caribbean. She escaped from Îles des Saintes on 1 April. She left Basse Terre 14 June, carrying sugar and coffee to France, and under the command of Lieutenant Gabriel-Étienne-Louis Le Marant Kerdaniel. She was capable of carrying 48 guns, but was armed en flûte, carrying only 20 at the time of her capture, 12 of which were carronades. She had a small crew, with 200 sailors, 40 soldiers and a detachment of troops from the 66th regiment of the line. On her voyage to France she came across a large English merchant vessel on 5 July. Furieuse was in the process of taking possession of the merchantman when the 20-gun sloop HMS Bonne Citoyenne, commanded by Commander William Mounsey, came upon the scene.

Bonne Citoyenne was returning to a convoy she was escorting in company with HMS Inflexible, under Captain Brown, but on seeing what was happening, Mounsey sailed to intervene. As Bonne Citoyenne approached, Furieuse abandoned her prize and began to flee northwards. Emboldened, Mounsey set off in pursuit; after an 18-hour chase Bonne Citoyenne had closed the range and brought Furieuse to battle.

The two ships exchanged broadsides for the next seven hours. Bonne Citoyenne was at a disadvantage early on. Not only was she much smaller, but three of her guns were quickly dismounted. She nevertheless fired 129 broadsides to the enemy's 70, with Mounsey alternating between the starboard and larboard sides as circumstances permitted. By the end of the battle Bonne Citoyenne had lost her top masts, her lower masts were badly damaged, and her rigging, sails and boats had been shot to pieces. Realizing that he was running out of powder, Mounsey decided to force the issue and prepared to board the French ship. Before he could do so, Furieuse surrendered and Mounsey took possession.

Furieuse had suffered heavy damage, with her masts shot away and five feet of water in the hold. She had also suffered 35 killed and 37 wounded. In contrast, Bonne Citoyenne had just one man killed and five wounded. Mounsey received a gold medal and promotion to post captain, back-dated to the day of the action, for his victory. Lieutenant Joseph Symes, first lieutenant of Bonne Citoyenne, received promotion to commander, effective two years after his having attained the rank of lieutenant, which had occurred on 13 March 1808. A number of other officers and crew also received promotions. In 1847 the Admiralty issued the Naval General Service Medal with clasp "Bonne Citoyenne Wh. Furieuse" to all surviving claimants from Bonne Cityonne.

== British career ==
Bonne Citoyenne towed Furieuse into Halifax, where both were repaired. The Royal Navy commissioned the captured frigate as HMS Furieuse and appointed John Simpson to sail her to Britain. (Note: Simpson's promotion to post-captain was not confirmed until November 1811, more than a year later. So far Furieuse has been the only ship of the Royal Navy to bear the name, though other ships have borne the English spelling, HMS Furious.)

Captain Brown of Inflexible sued for the prize money for Furieuse to be shared by the two British warships. However, the Vice admiralty court in Halifax ruled that the prize belonged to Bonne Citoyenne alone, with the judgement being upheld by the Court of Appeal in 1811.

On her arrival Furieuse underwent a more thorough repair. After the repairs she was commissioned in November 1811 under William Mounsey.

Furieuse was initially employed in escorting a convoy to the Mediterranean, after which she joined the fleet blockading Toulon under Admiral Edward Pellew. The French fleet sailed out in May 1812, consisting of 12 sail of the line and seven frigates, of which one ship of the line and two frigates began to chase the British inshore squadron, consisting of Furieuse, the frigates HMS Menelaus and HMS Havannah, and the brig HMS Pelorus. The French gave up the chase when the British made clear their intention to fight.

On 9 November 1812 Furieuse captured the French privateer Nebrophonus, off Veutiliceo, after a chase of two hours. She was armed with four guns and had a crew of 54 men. She was 34 days out of Naples and had not made any captures. The day before she had escaped from Imperieuse and Unite. Unite was in sight when Furieuse captured Nebrophonus. On 24 November Furieuse captured the French schooner Fortuna. In October 1815 prize money was paid for Nebrophonus and Fortuna. (Note: A first-class share was worth £357 18s 3 3/4d; a sixth-class share, that of an ordinary seaman, was worth £3 6s 11 1/4d.)

Then on 1 January 1813 Fureuse captured the privateer Argus off Montecristo. Argus was pierced for 12 guns but carried only four 12-pounders. She had a crew of 85 men and was eight days out of Leghorn without having captured anything.

In February 1813 Mounsey supported Charles John Napier in HMS Thames in the capture of the island of Ponza. They landed troops on 26 February, after passing through fire from shore batteries. Neither vessel, nor the troops they brought with them, suffered any casualties. The capture of the harbour provided an anchorage and fresh water for Royal Navy ships patrolling the coast.

On 7 May boats from Furieuse captured the French xebec Conception of two 6-pounder guns. The boats cut her out from under the tower and batteries of Orbisello and towed her out to sea under heavy fire. Fureiuse lost four men wounded in this operation.

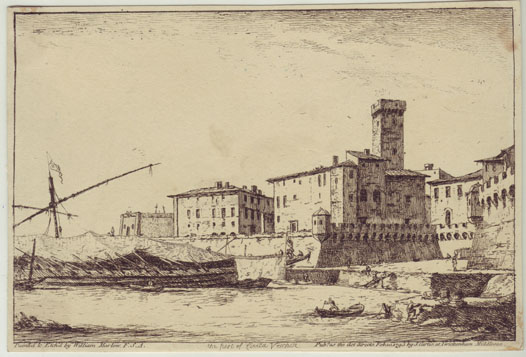
Civitavecchia in 1795, etching by William Marlow

On 4 October a convoy was sighted in the bay of Santa Marinella, a few miles east of Civitavecchia. Although two gunboats and a shore battery of two long 24-pounder guns protected the convoy, Mounsey decided to launch a cutting out expedition. Furieuse landed her marines who, together with the boat crews, stormed and captured a fort while Furieuse used her guns to provide covering fire. The enemy retreated to a nearby castle and continued to pour small arms fire on the landing party. Still, the British captured 156 vessels, three of which were armed: the gunboat Bacchus (one long brass 24-pounder gun and four swivel guns), an unknown gunboat, and the xebec St Antonio (pierced for 12 guns with two long 6-pounders mounted). The British sank two of the armed vessels, brought out one, as well as 13 settees carrying salt, tobacco, marble, and sundries. Furieuse kept up a steady fire, preventing reinforcements from Civitavecchia from intervening. The landing party lost two men killed and 10 wounded in the operation. Bacchus was under the command of maître d'équipage de lè" classe Sacco.

For the rest of 1813 Furieuse formed part of Admiral Sir Josias Rowley's squadron. She was present at the capture of Viareggio and the unsuccessful assault on Livorno in December. In early March 1814, still with Rowley, Furieuse assisted in the occupation of La Spezia and the surrounding areas.

On 17 April a squadron consisting of Furieuse, HMS Aboukir, HMS Iphigenia, HMS Swallow and HMS Cephalus, among many others, including the Sicilian flotilla, and under the command of Vice-Admiral Pellew, supported the successful assault on Genoa. (Note: A first-class share of the prize money for Genoa was worth £538 5s 2 3/4d; a sixth-class share, that of an ordinary seaman, was worth £3 12s 4d. In a later, second payment, a first-class share was worth £169 2s 8d, while a sixth-class share was worth £1 2s 8 1/4d. In a third payment, a first-class share of the prize money was worth £69 6s 1d; a sixth-class share, that of an ordinary seaman, was worth 9s 4d.)

The end of the War of the Sixth Coalition in 1814 saw Furieuse sailing from Gibraltar to Bermuda with Captain Andrew King's squadron, escorting a fleet of transports. Later she conveyed the 62nd regiment to Halifax. At the end of the War of 1812 she remained in the area to assist the British troops who had fortified the Castine Peninsula.

== Fate ==
HMS Furieuse was paid off in autumn 1815. She was sold for breaking up in October 1816 at Deptford.
