= Action of 4 August 1800 =

1800 action of the War of the Second Coalition

- Part of the War of the Second Coalition
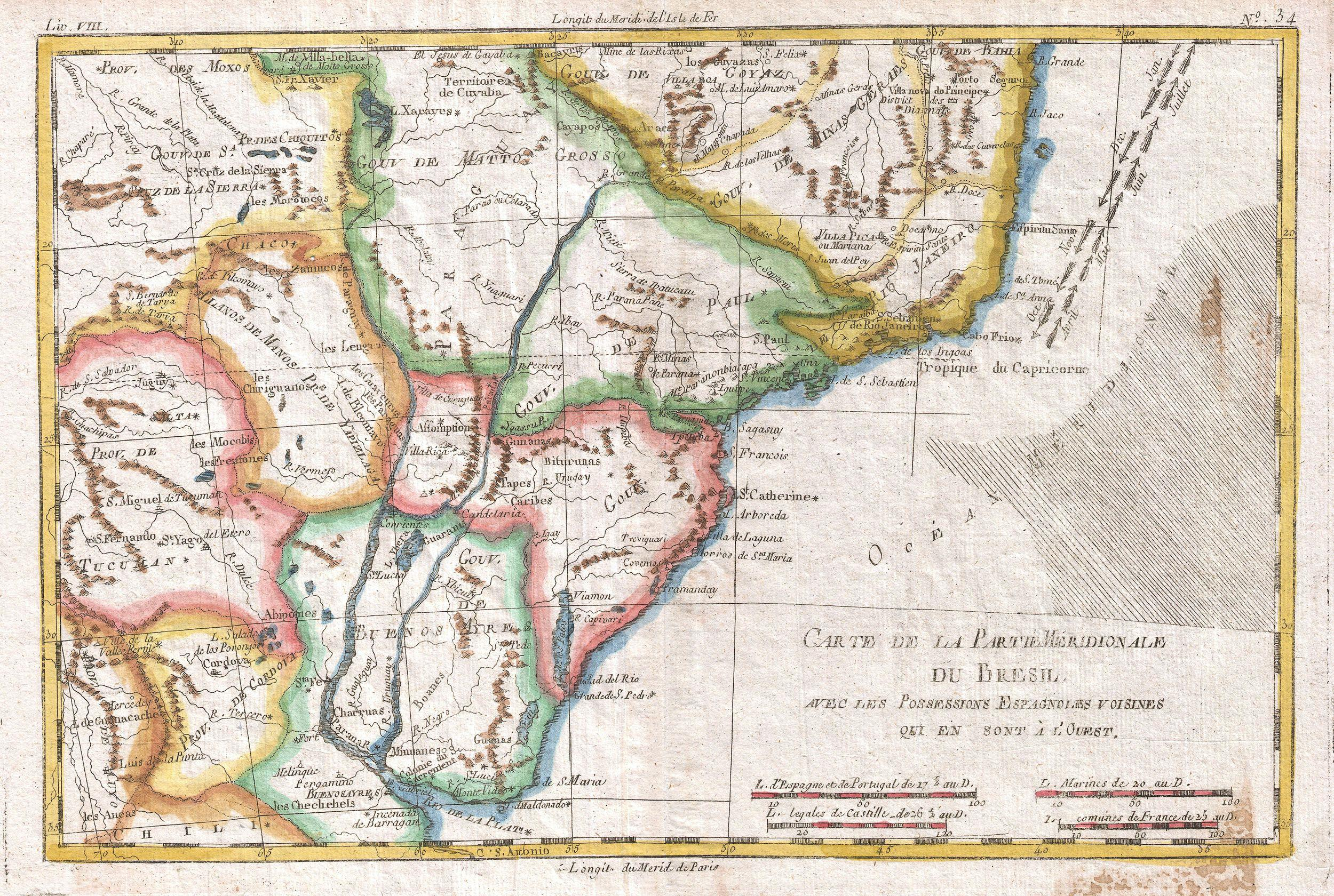
- 1780 map of the Brazilian coast
Date	4 August 1800
Location	Off Trindade, Atlantic Ocean
Result	British victory

Belligerents
Great Britain	France

Commanders and leaders
Rowley Bulteel	Jean-François Landolphe (surrendered)

Strength
1 ship of the line 8 merchant ships	3 frigates

Casualties and losses
None	2 frigates captured

The action of 4 August 1800 took place off the Brazilian coast during the War of the Second Coalition. A French Navy squadron of three frigates under Commodore Jean-François Landolphe which had been raiding British commerce off West Africa approached and attempted to attack a British merchant convoy. The convoy was escorted by the Royal Navy ship of the line HMS Belliqueux. In an attempt to intimidate the French into retreating, the convoy formed a line of battle, which unnerved Landolphe. Supposing his target to be a fleet of powerful warships, he turned to escape and Belliqeux's commander Captain Rowley Bulteel immediately ordered a pursuit. To preserve Landolphe's mistaken impression Bulteel also ordered four of the most powerful East Indiamen in the British convoy to join the chase.

Belliqueux rapidly outran Landolphe's flagship Concorde, leaving Landolphe with no option but to strike his colours without any serious resistance. The rest of the French squadron continued to flee separately during the night, each pursued by two East Indiamen. After an hour and a half in pursuit, with darkness falling, the East Indiaman Exeter came alongside the French frigate Médée, giving the impression by use of lights that Exeter was a large ship of the line. Believing himself outgunned, Médée's commander Frigate Captain Jean-Daniel Coudin also struck his colours, only discovering his assailant's true identity when he came aboard Exeter. The action was the only instance during the French Revolutionary and Napoleonic Wars in which a British merchant vessel captured a large French warship.

== Background ==
By 1800, Britain and France had been at war for seven years as part of the French Revolutionary Wars, including the then-ongoing War of the Second Coalition. The British Royal Navy held control of the sea following a number of major victories over the French, Spanish and Batavian navies. Off every French port, large squadrons of British ships of the line and frigates awaited French movements and whenever possible intercepted their ships. While British merchantmen travelled in large, well-armed convoys, French ships were forced to slip between harbours to avoid British blockaders. To counter Britain's control of the seas, France periodically despatched naval squadrons to raid British shipping, particularly off West Africa and in the South Atlantic, where the stretched Royal Navy maintained only a minimal presence.

During the French Revolutionary and Napoleonic Wars, convoys of British East Indiamen were among French raiders' principal targets. East Indiamen sailed from Britain with general cargo, or often military stores and troops, to the East Indies. There, they would sell their cargoes and take on tea, spices, silk or other luxury goods before making the return journey to Britain. A round trip took over a year and an East Indiaman sailing to Britain would routinely carry hundreds of thousands of pounds worth of trade goods; one large convoy that set sail from Canton in January 1804 was worth over £8 million. East Indiamen were well-protected, armed with up to 30 guns, and generally travelled in large convoys in which the ships could provide one another with mutual protection. Such convoys often had a Royal Navy escort, usually including a ship of the line.

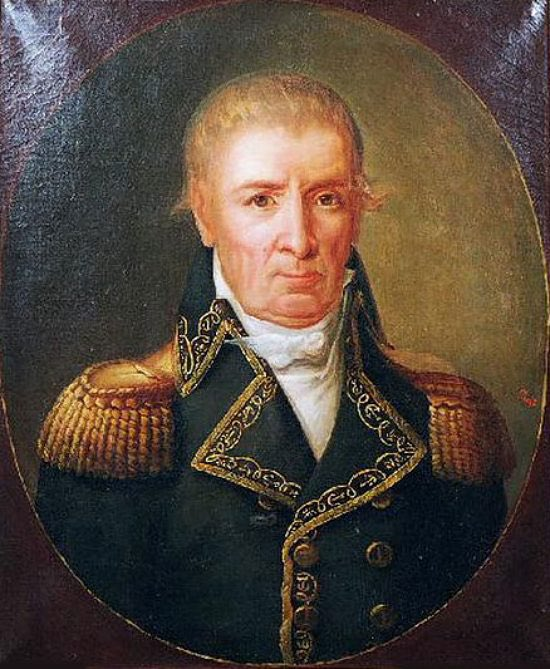
Jean-François Landolphe, the French commander at the action

On 6 March 1799, a French squadron under Commodore Jean-François Landolphe set sail from Rochefort. The squadron consisted of the frigates Concorde (captained by Landolphe), Médée (captained by Frigate Captain Jean-Daniel Coudin) and Franchise (captain by Frigate Captain Pierre Roch Jurien de La Gravière), and was a powerful force capable of inflicting significant damage on lightly defended enemy merchant shipping. Eluding blockading British warships off Rochefort, the squadron sailed southwards until it reached the West African coast. There, Landolphe's ships began an extended commerce raiding operation and inflicted severe damage on British trade in West Africa for the rest of the year.

The French squadron was eventually forced by the strain of serving in tropical waters on their ships to undergo an extensive refit in the Spanish Viceroyalty of the Río de la Plata in South America, which contained the nearest available friendly shipyards. Repairs continued for six months, until Landolphe considered the squadron once again ready to sail in the early summer of 1800. The squadron almost immediately captured an American schooner, fitting it out as a ship's tender. At the time, France and the United States had been engaged for two years in the Quasi-War.

== Battle ==
The British convoy consisted of the East Indiamen Bombay Castle, Exeter, Dorsetshire, Coutts, and Neptune, the Botany Bay ships Royal Admiral and Anne, and the whaler Seringapatam. The sole British warship was Belliqueux. On 4 August they were near the island of Trindade off the Brazilian coast. From there the East Indiamen would catch the westerly trade winds that would carry them to Saint Helena, the Cape of Good Hope, and their destinations.

At 07:00 on 4 August, while the French squadron was cruising off the Brazilian coast, lookouts sighted sails on the horizon. Uncertain of the identity of the strange ships, the French gradually closed the distance during the morning. Landolphe could see that there were seven large vessels and three smaller ships, all unmistakably British. He was unable however to tell whether they were naval ships of the line or East Indiamen. Initially he thought they might be merchant ships, but at noon he sighted double rows of gunports along the side of each ship and called off the attack, turning away and signalling for his squadron to split up, believing the enemy to be large warships easily capable of destroying his small force. Captain Jurien protested Landolphe's order, insisting that the convoy was composed of merchant ships and not warships, but Landolphe over-ruled Jurien's protests. In fact, Jurien was correct.

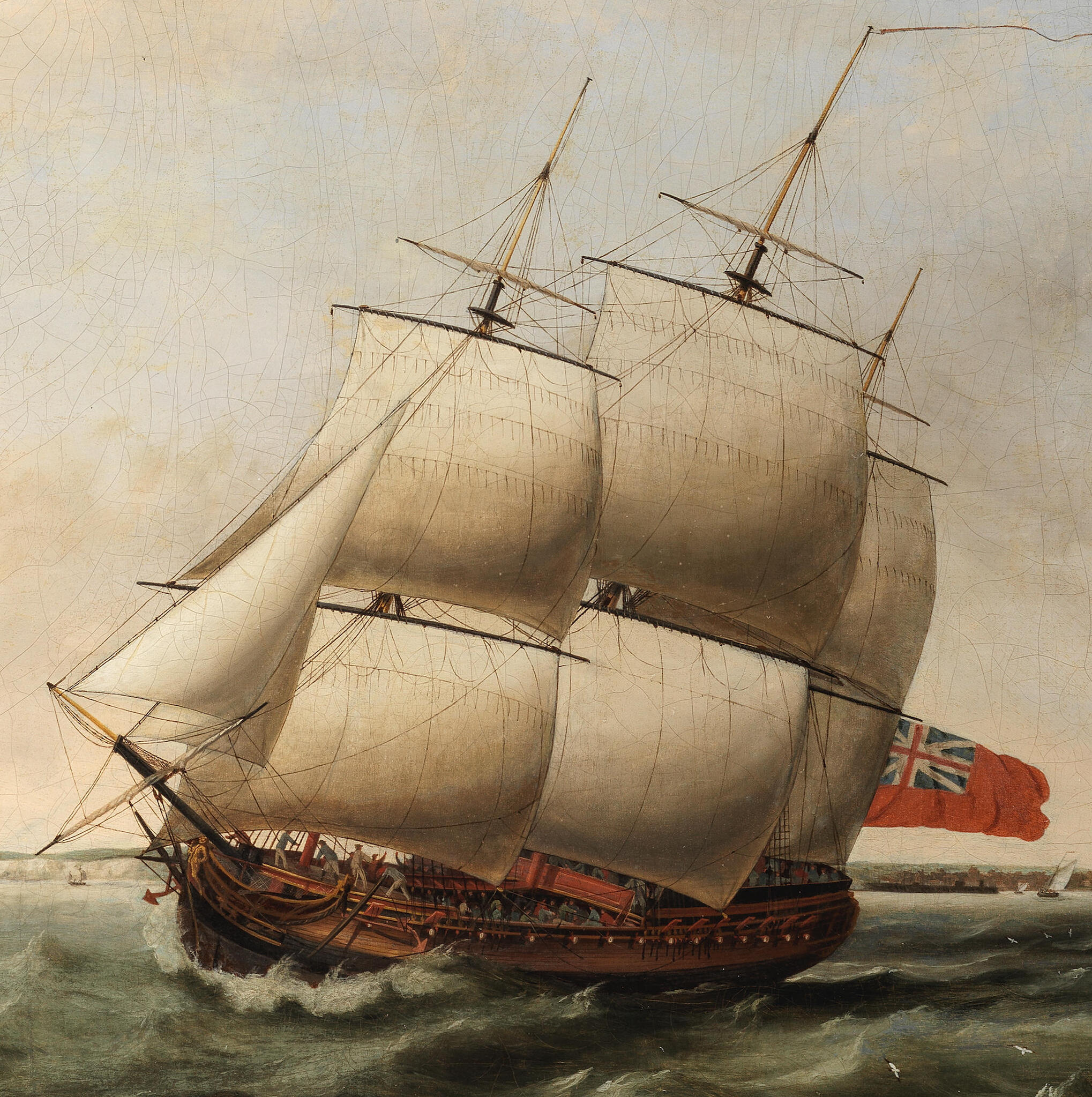
Neptune, one of the British East Indiamen present at the action

With the French in full flight, Bulteel determined to continue the ruse that his convoy consisted of warships. While he and Belliqueux pursued Concorde, he signalled for his largest East Indiamen to follow the other French ships to ensure that they did not return and counterattack the convoy while Belliqueux was engaged. Exeter, under Captain Henry Meriton, and Bombay Castle, under Captain John Hamilton, were to follow Médée while Coutts, under Captain Robert Torin, and Neptune, under Captain Nathaniel Spens, were to follow Franchise. All four vessels were over 1200 tons (bm) and carried 30 cannon each, but none had more than 130 crew aboard and could not compete in accuracy or rate of fire with the 315 men aboard each of the French ships. Throughout the afternoon the chase continued, with Belliqueux steadily gaining on the French flagship while Franchise, accompanied by the American schooner, gained on her pursuers. At 17:20, Bulteel was within long range of Landolphe's ship, which returned fire when possible. During the exchange of gunfire neither side suffered damage or casualties, but the ship of the line was clearly gaining on the frigate and within ten minutes Landolphe surrendered rather than see his ship destroyed and his men killed in an unequal combat.

By 19:00, Franchise had dumped her lifeboats and a large quantity of guns and supplies overboard, lightening the ship enough for her to far outstrip the pursuit. As night fell the French frigate made a full escape from the British force. Médée however had not escaped. Although Bombay Castle was many miles behind, only distantly visible on the horizon, Exeter had been able to follow the frigate closely. Meriton was aware that the French warship was much stronger than his own merchant vessel, but realized that as the frigate had made no effort to fight, her commander must believe Exeter to be a ship of the line. To reinforce this image in the rapidly approaching darkness, Meriton arranged lights behind every gunport, whether or not it contained a cannon, creating an effect described as "a fearsome, leering jack-o'-lantern". As his ship drew level with the French frigate, Meriton hailed the enemy's deck, calling on them to surrender. Intimidated by this large and seemingly powerful enemy, Coudin decided that his only option was to strike his flag and come aboard the British ship to surrender formally. Arriving on board, he was astonished to see far fewer and smaller guns than a warship normally carried. When Coudin asked to whom he had surrendered, Meriton is said to have replied "To a merchantman". Appalled, Coudin demanded to be allowed to return to his ship and conduct a formal naval battle, but Meriton refused.

== Aftermath ==
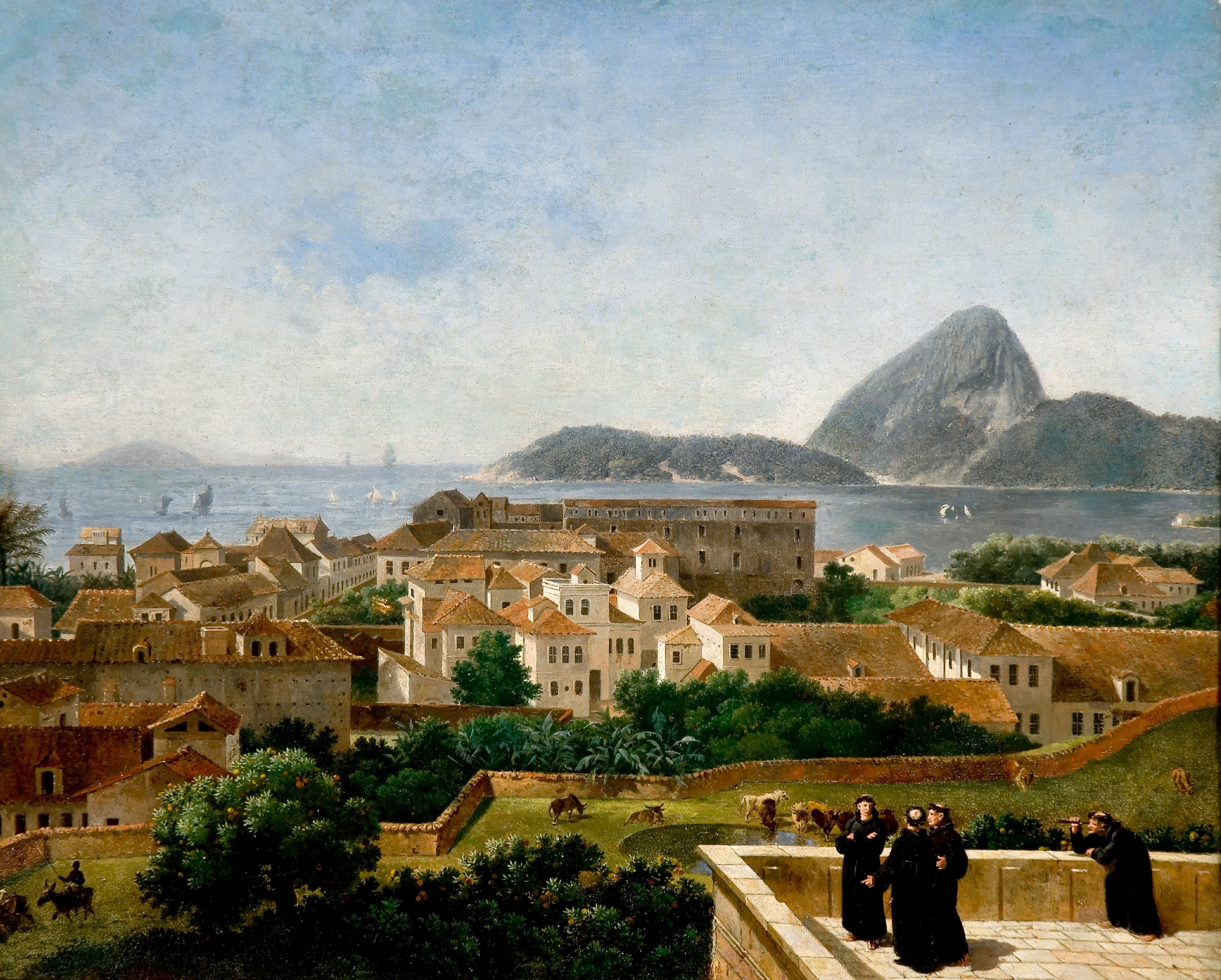
1816 painting of Rio de Janeiro, where the British resupplied after the action

In the engagement on 4 August 1800 neither side had a single man killed or wounded; the action still inflicted a severe naval defeat on a powerful French frigate force, ending its successful raiding career. Captain Jurien in Franchise spent another three weeks off the Brazilian coast before returning to France. On 9 August he encountered the merchantman Wellesley, which was on her way to the Cape Colony, but after an engagement of about an hour, the British ship succeeded in driving off her attacker. Jurien followed Wellesley for two days but then gave up the chase; he then did not see another sail until he left the area. Bulteel's convoy continued on, pausing at Rio de Janeiro on 12 August to resupply. The East Indiamen then went on to Saint Helena on their way to Asia. The two Botany Bay ships sailed on to Australia and the whaler Seringapatam sailed for the South Seas.

The captured frigates were valuable prizes but the Royal Navy only acquired Medée, which it took into service as HMS Medee; the Navy never commissioned Medee but instead used as a prison ship for a few years before selling her in 1805. The frigates had come into port shortly before the Peace of Amiens and thus were deemed surplus to Navy requirements. The ships and their stores and equipment were sold privately; the proceeds from the sale were paid as prize money in February 1803. The British crews also benefited from head-money, a financial award for each French sailor captured during the engagement. Bulteel and Meriton were commended. Meriton was to fight two more naval battles against the French, serving at the successful defence of the China Fleet at the Battle of Pulo Aura in February 1804. He was badly wounded and captured by a French frigate squadron after a fierce defence at the action of 3 July 1810.
