= Bonne Citoyenne-class corvette =

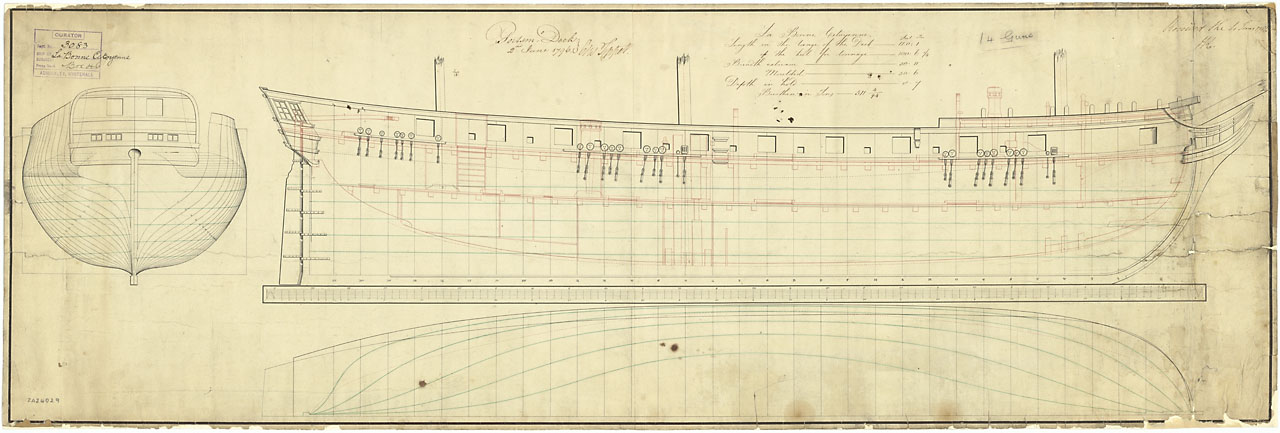
- Plan of Bonne Citoyenne made after her capture

Class overview
- Name: Bonne Citoyenne
- Operators: French Navy; Royal Navy
- Planned: 4
- Completed: 4
- Retired: 4

General characteristics
- Type: Corvette in French service; Sixth-rate ship-sloop or frigate in British service
- Tons burthen: 514 bm
- Length: 120 ft (37 m) (overall); 100 ft (30.5 m) (keel)
- Beam: 31 ft (9.4 m)
- Depth of hold: 8 ft (2.4 m)
- Sail plan: Full-rigged ship
- Complement: French service: 200; British service: 155
- Armament: French service: 20 × 8-pounder guns; British service: Upper deck: 20 × 32-pounder carronades; Fc: 2 × 9-pounder guns + 2 × 12-pounder carronades

The four Bonne Citoyenne-class corvettes were built to a design by Raymond-Antoine Hasan. All members of the class were flush-decked, but with a long topgallant forecastle. The corvettes were launched between 1794 and 1796, and the Royal Navy captured all four between 1796 and 1798.

After the Royal Navy captured Bonne Citoyenne, the Admiralty used her lines as the basis for the Hermes-class post ships.

== Ships ==
- Bonne Citoyenne: launched 1794, captured 1796; as HMS Bonne Citoyenne sold 1819.
- Perçante: launched 1795, captured 1796 and renamed HMS Jamaica; sold 1814.
- Vaillante, launched 1796, captured 1798 and renamed HMS Danae, returned to French control by mutineers on March 14, 1800, and renamed Vaillante; sold 1801.
- Gaieté, launched in 1797, captured the same year and commissioned as HMS Gaiete (also Gayette); sold in 1808.
