= Anne (1799 ship) =

18th-century Spanish sailing ship

History

Spain
- Name: Nostra Senora da Luzet Santa Anna
- Launched: 1790s
- Captured: 1799

Great Britain
- Name: Anne or Ann
- Owner: Princep and Saunders
- Acquired: 1799 by purchase of a prize

General characteristics
- Tons burthen: 384, or 400 (bm)
- Complement: 42
- Armament: 1799: 2 × 6-pounder + 8 × 4-pounder guns; Later: 12 guns

Anne, also known as Ann, was an 18th-century Spanish sailing ship that the British had captured in 1799. The British Navy Board engaged her to transport convicts from Cork in Ireland to the penal colony of New South Wales in Australia for one voyage from 1800 to 1801. During this voyage she was possibly present, although she did not participate, in a notable action against a squadron of three French frigates. She then made one voyage for the British East India Company (EIC).

== Origins ==
Anne was Spanish-built in the 1790s., She was originally named Nostra Senora da Luzet Santa Anna, or Luz St Anne or Luz St Anna. The armed transports Dover and Cecilia captured Nostra Senora da Luzet Santa Anna in 1799, during the French Revolutionary Wars. The Admiralty then sold her.

She appears in Lloyd's Register for 1799 as Lucy St Anna, with Whitford, master, Barnett, owner, and trade London–Botany Bay.

== Voyage to Australia ==
On 9 April 1799, the Navy Board engaged the renamed Anne and licensed her in London for a single voyage transporting convicts. Her master was James Stewart. For security she was provided with 12 ship's guns and manned by a crew of 42, including additional seamen to act as guards. The British War Office declined a request for a detachment of Marines, citing the burden created by the ongoing war with France.

Under the command of James Stewart, on 26 June 1800 Anne sailed from Cork carrying 147 male and 24 female convicts.

A little over a month later, on 29 July, Stewart and Anne's crew suppressed a mutiny. In the affray one convict was killed and some others were wounded. After consulting with his officers, Stewart had the ringleader of the uprising, a United Irishman Marcus Sheehy, from Limerick shot. He was the only convict ever to have been executed at sea by firing squad. (Note: By one account other ringleaders were hanged.) Another man was subjected to 250 lashes.Later, a Vice-Admiralty Court would try Stewart and the Chief Mate, and honourably acquit them.

Anne was one of the vessels in the convoy at the action on 4 August when HMS Belliqueux and the East Indiaman Exeter captured the French frigates Concorde and Médée. A squadron of three French frigates had attacked the convoy of East Indiamen that Anne was accompanying, only to suffer an embarrassing defeat.

Anne arrived at Rio de Janeiro on 22 August. Lloyd's List reported in January 1801 that the Botany Bay ship Ann had been at Rio de Janeiro, having sailed in company with several ships of the East India Company.

From Rio Anne sailed to the Cape of Good Hope. At Cape Town she embarked eight more sailors and soldiers.

Anne arrived at Port Jackson on 21 February 1801 with 127 male and 24 female convicts. In all, 20 male convicts had died on 240-day voyage. Anne left Port Jackson on 9 July bound for China.

== East India Company ==
Ann [sic] made one voyage for the EIC. Under Captain James Stewart's command she was at Calcutta 19 November 1801. On 1 January 1802 she passed Saugor and reached St Helena on 20 April. She arrived at Gravesend on 25 June.

The British Library reports that she made a second voyage for the EIC some years later. However records of British letters of marque show the Ann of the second EIC voyage as a ship of 627 tons (bm). Actually, that vessel appears to be the Ann that transported convicts in 1809-10, and for her return trip carried cargo for the EIC from Calcutta to Britain (1810–11).
