= French frigate Concorde (1791) =

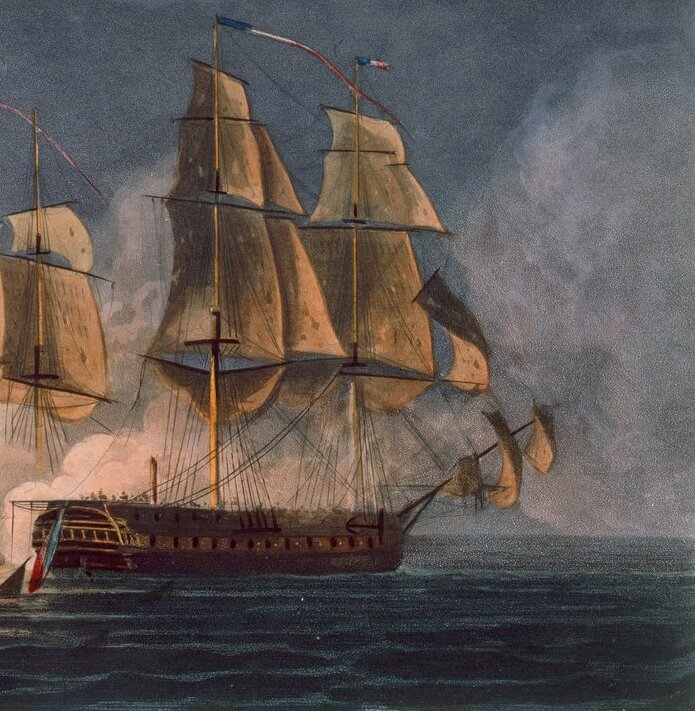
- Thétis, Concorde's sister ship

History

France
- Name: Concorde
- Namesake: Concord
- Builder: Brest
- Laid down: April 1790
- Launched: 25 October 1791
- In service: May 1793
- Captured: 4 August 1800

General characteristics
- Class & type: Nymphe-class frigate
- Displacement: 1,423 tonneaux
- Tons burthen: 744 port tonneaux
- Length: 46.9 m (153 ft 10 in)
- Beam: 11.9 m (39 ft 1 in)
- Draught: 5.8 m (19 ft 0 in)
- Sail plan: Full-rigged ship
- Armament: 40 guns to 46 guns

Concorde was a Nymphe-class 40-gun frigate of the French Navy. The Royal Navy captured her at the action of 4 August 1800.

== Service history ==
On 27 May 1793, Concorde captured the 24-gun HMS Hyaena; she became the privateer Hyene, which the Royal Navy recaptured in 1797.

Concorde took part in the Expédition d'Irlande, and on 12 October 1798, in aftermath of the Battle of Tory Island.

Concorde was part of a squadron of three frigates, Concorde under Commodore Jean-François Landolphe, Médée under Captain Jean-Daniel Coudin, and Franchise under Captain Pierre Jurien, with Landolphe as the overall commander, that left Rochefort on 6 March 1799. Eluding the British blockade off Rochefort, the squadron sailed southwards until it reached the coast of West Africa. There, Landolphe's ships began an extended commerce raiding operation, inflicting severe damage on the West African trade. During this time, the squadron captured the Portuguese island of Prince (Príncipe). Eventually the strain of serving in tropical waters told on the ships and all three were forced to undergo an extensive refit in the nearest available allied shipyards, which were located in the Spanish-held River Plate in South America. At Montevideo the squadron assisted the French prisoners that had captured and taken into that port the convict transport Lady Shore which was carrying them to Australia.

Repairs continued for six months, until Landolphe considered the squadron once again ready to sail in the early summer of 1800. The squadron almost immediately captured off the coast of Brazil the American schooner Espérance (Hope), which they used as an aviso and sent to Cayenne with a prize crew under the command of enseigne de vaisseau Hamon. (At the time, France and the United States had been engaged for two years in the Quasi War.)

== Fate ==
The fourth rate HMS Belliqueux, captured Concorde off Rio de Janeiro at the action of 4 August 1800. The British sailed her to port in Britain but the Royal Navy did not take her into service.
