= French frigate Franchise =

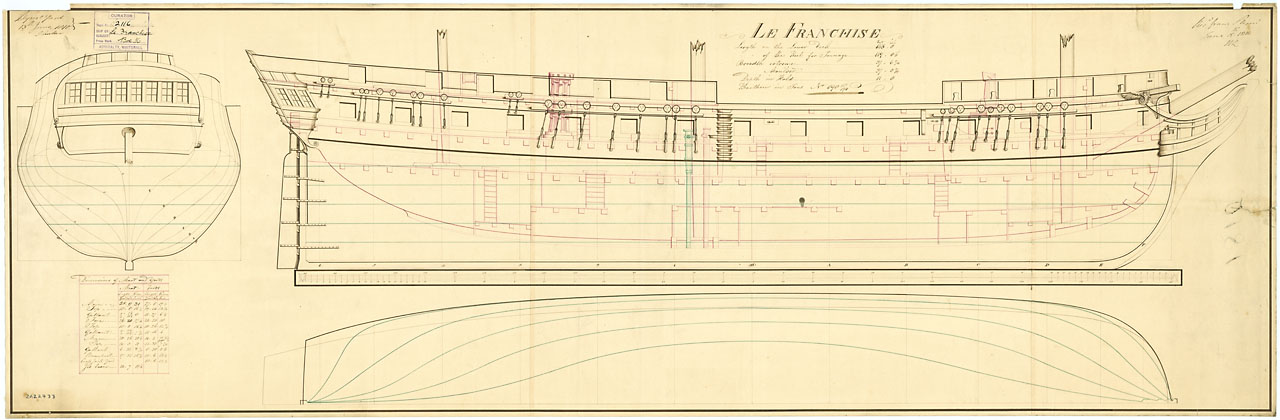
- Franchise

History

France
- Name: Franchise ("truthfulness")
- Builder: Bayonne
- Laid down: August 1794
- Launched: 17 October 1797
- In service: May 1798
- Captured: 28 May 1803

United Kingdom
- Name: Franchise
- Acquired: 28 May 1803 by capture
- Fate: Broken up November 1815

General characteristics
- Class & type: Coquille-class frigate
- Displacement: 1,180 tonneaux
- Tons burthen: 590 port tonneaux; 89816/94 (bm)
- Length: 143 ft 8 in (43.8 m) (gundeck); 119 ft 8 1/4 in (36.5 m) (keel)
- Beam: 37 ft 6 3/4 in (11.4 m)
- Draught: 5.3 m (17 ft)
- Depth of hold: 11 ft 8 in (3.6 m)
- Sail plan: Full-rigged ship
- Complement: British service:264 (later 215)
- Armament: French service: Upper deck: 28 × 12-pounder long guns; QD & Fc:16 × 8-pounder long guns; British service: Upperdeck:26 × 12-pounder guns; QD:2 × 12- pounder guns + 10 × 24-pounder carronades; Fc:2 × 12-pounder guns + 4 × 18-pounder carronades

Franchise was launched in 1797 as a 40-gun Coquille-class frigate of the French Navy. The British captured her in 1803 and took her into the Royal Navy under her existing name. In the war on commerce during the Napoleonic Wars she was more protector than prize-taker, capturing many small privateers but few commercial prizes. She was also at the battle of Copenhagen. She was broken up in 1815.

== French service and capture ==
She was part of a squadron of three frigates, Concorde under Commodore Jean-François Landolphe, Médée under Captain Jean-Daniel Coudin, and Franchise under Captain Pierre Jurien, with Landolphe as the overall commander, that left Rochefort on 6 March 1799. Eluding the British blockade off Rochefort, the squadron sailed southwards until it reached the coast of West Africa. There Landolphe's ships began an extended commerce raiding operation, inflicting severe damage on the West African trade for the rest of the year. During this time, the squadron captured the Portuguese island of Prince (Príncipe). Eventually the strain of serving in tropical waters told on the ships and all three were forced to undergo an extensive refit in the nearest available allied shipyards, which were located in the Spanish-held River Plate in South America. At Montevideo the squadron assisted the French prisoners that had captured and taken into that port the convict transport Lady Shore, which was carrying them to Australia.

Repairs continued for six months, until Landolphe considered the squadron once again ready to sail in the early summer of 1800. The squadron almost immediately captured off the coast of Brazil the American schooner Espérance (Hope), which they used as an aviso and sent to Cayenne with a prize crew under the command of enseigne de vaisseau Hamon. (At the time, France and the United States had been engaged for two years in the Quasi War.)

During the action of 4 August 1800, off Rio de Janeiro, HMS Belliqueux captured Concorde and Landolphe, and the East Indiamen Exeter and Bombay Castle captured Médée. On 9 August Franchise encountered the merchantman Wellesley, which was on her way to the Cape, but after an engagement of about an hour, the British ship succeeded in driving off her attacker. Franchise followed Wellesley for two days but then gave up the chase; On 7 September, 1800 she captured and burned American ship "Pacific" (37°06′N 43°06′W), "Rambler" on an unknown date and location, and "Russell" on 10 September (39°00′N 39°00′W). Franchise managed to return to France, running back through the British blockade.

On 28 May 1803 HMS Minotaur, in company with Thunderer, and later joined by Albion, captured Franchise. Franchise was 33 days out of Port-au-Prince; of the sixteen 9-pounders on her quarterdeck and forecastle, ten were in her hold. She had a crew of 187 men under the command of Captain Jurien. (Note: The original notice in the London Gazette gave the frigate's name as Françoise. The next edition corrected the name to Franchise.)

Because she had been with Admiral William Cornwallis's fleet, Minotaur had to share the prize money not only with Thunderer and Albion, but also with Aigle, Culloden, Dreadnought, Hazard, Sceptre, Venerable, and possibly others.

== British service ==
From June to mid-October Franchise was in Plymouth being fitted. She was commissioned in November under Captain Lord John Murray. He then sailed her to the Leeward Islands on 26 February 1804.

With the resumption of the war Admiral James Dacres was appointed second in command on the Jamaica station, serving under Sir John Thomas Duckworth and flying his flag in the Franchise.

On 26 March 1804, Franchise was with a convoy when she sighted a schooner. Dacres ordered Murray to pursue the schooner. By evening Franchise had captured the privateer Petite Harmonie, which was under the command of Citizen Guerel. She was armed with two 4-pounder guns and had a crew of 22 men. Dacres had her destroyed.

Later, Franchise recaptured the schooners Vulture and Polly, and destroyed the privateer schooner Pauline. On 10 June, Franchise captured Harmony.

Then on 13 September, Franchise chased a privateer schooner for eight hours before capturing her. The privateer was Uranie, of three guns and 64 men. She was 13 days out of the city of Santo Domingo but had taken no prizes. Murray reported that "[she] is supposed to be the fastest, sailing Vessel in those Seas." Lastly, on 24 December, Franchise was in company with Pelican when they captured Nostra Senora del Belin.

Franchise was off Curaçao on 24 April 1805 when she sighted a schooner that anchored under the guns of the fort of Port Maria. Franchise sailed in and fired on the schooner and the fort before she could cut her out. The schooner turned out to be a tender to the Dutch frigate Kenau Hasselar. (Note: On 1 January 1807 the British captured Curaçao. There they captured Kenau Hasselar, which they took into service, and the sloop Suriname, which was a former British sloop, as well as a number of other vessels.) The schooner had a crew of a lieutenant and 35 men, but a number escaped ashore, leaving behind 24 of their wounded compatriots, as well as the surgeon and the lieutenant. Franchise had one man seriously wounded and two men slightly wounded. The schooner was carrying lumber and rice.

On 6 May, Franchise and Elk captured Hazard. Two days later, Fortunee captured the sloop Sally. Franchise was among the vessels that shared in the prize money. Ten days after that, Franchise and Elk captured Globe.

Murray died suddenly aboard ship on 13 July 1805 and Captain Randall M'Donnell replaced him. M'Donnell was captain when on 24 October, Franchise captured Washington. Later that month, Franchise's boats captured the Spanish privateer felucca General Ferrand on 25 October. General Ferrand was armed with one 6-pounder gun, two 4-pounders, swivel guns, and small arms. She was four days out of "Saint Jago" (probably Santiago de Cuba), and had taken no prizes.

=== Capture of Raposa ===
In January 1806 Franchise was under the command of Captain Charles Dashwood. (Note: Winfield implies that M'Donnell was still captain, and the National Maritime Museum's database has the same information. Unfortunately, they are clearly wrong.) He received information that several Spanish vessels had anchored in the Bay of Campeche and he determined to try to cut them out. On the night of 6 January Franchise arrived some five leagues off the town of Campeche and Dashwood had her anchor in four fathoms as the water was too shallow to come any closer. He then sent in three of Franchise's boats under the command of Lieutenants John Fleming and Peter Douglas, his first and third lieutenants, and Lieutenant Mends of the Marines. Because of the distance they had to row, the British were unable to approach closely until 4am, by which time the moon had risen, they had been spotted, and the Spaniards alerted. The Spanish vessels consisted of two naval brigs, one of 20 guns and 180 men, and another of 12 guns and 90 men, a schooner armed with eight guns, and seven gunboats, each armed with two guns. They opened fire on the approaching row boats and might have destroyed the attack had Lieutenant Fleming not led his three boats to the smaller of the brigs and boarded her. After about ten minutes of hand-to-hand fighting, the British had captured her and were sailing her out, pursued by the other Spanish vessels, which continued to fire on them. The British returned fire from their prize and their boats and the Spanish vessels withdrew.

The captured vessel turned out to be the brig Raposa, pierced for 16 guns but mounting only 12, and also carrying some coehorns, swivel guns, and small arms. She had a crew of 90 men, but her captain, Don Joaquin de la Cheva and most of his officers were ashore, with the result that there were only 75 men on aboard. The Spanish suffered five men killed, not including some who drowned when they jumped overboard, and the senior officer on board and 25 men wounded, many mortally. The British had only seven men wounded. Dashwood sent all the Spanish wounded and prisoners ashore under a flag of truce as they could receive better care there. The British took the corvette into service as HMS Raposa. The Lloyd's Patriotic Fund presented each of the three lieutenants with a sword worth £50, and Midshipman Lamb with a sword worth £30. (Note: Lieutenant Fleming commissioned the schooner Bramble in Bermuda in June 1808.)

Franchise captured the Spanish garda costa schooner Carmen, of one gun and 34 men, on 11 June. (Note: A first-class share of the head money for the 34 men was worth £48 8s 2¼d; a sixth-class share was worth 2s 6d.) Eight days later Franchise also captured the Dutch schooner Brutus, of 20 men. Douglas served in the boats at the capture of Carmen, and on board that ship he succeeded in making two prizes, and in driving an armed vessel on shore. In December 1807 prize money was announced for "Proceeds of a Quantity of Cocoa, captured in sundry small Spanish Vessels, Names unknown, on the 19th of June."

=== Hurricane ===
In July Veteran, Franchise, and Magicienne were escorting a convoy of 109 West Indiamen back to England. The convoy had cleared the Gulf of Florida when it encountered a hurricane. Twenty merchantmen foundered and Magicienne was so damaged that she could not proceed and instead had to put into Bermuda for repairs. Franchise had lost her fore mast and main-top-mast but Dashwood was still able to rally the surviving merchantmen and bring them back to England.

By mid-summer 1807 Franchise had returned to England. She then sailed to the Baltic where she took part in the Battle of Copenhagen. (Note: A petty officer's share of the prize money for the capture of the Danish fleet was £22 11s; a seaman's share was £3 8s.)

By early 1808 Franchise was back in the Channel, still under Dashwood's command. He sailed her for the West Indies on 21 February. Two days later she was 12 leagues south of the Isles of Scilly when she sighted a French lugger privateer hovering around the convoy that Franchise was escorting. The privateer, on capture, turned out to be Hazard, of four guns and a crew of 50, under the command of Francois Blanchet. Hazard was three days out of Granville, Manche, and had not captured anything. (Note: Prize money was paid in February 1815. A first-class share was worth £36 14s 6¼d; a fifth-class share, that of a seaman, was worth 2s 11½d.) Franchise shared the head money with Star.

On 10 November 1808, Franchise, Reindeer, Aurora, Daedalus, and Pert met by chance. The captains got together and decided to capture the town and port of Samaná in order to assist the Spanish patriots that had established a blockade of San Domingo. The town was also the last port of refuge for privateers to the windward of San Domingo and the enemy were in the act of erecting batteries for its protection. The British entered the following day and took possession of the harbour. Captain Charles Dashwood handed Samana over to a Spanish officer, Don Diego de Lira, who guaranteed the safety of the French inhabitants on their plantations.

During the following week the British captured two French 5-gun privateer schooners. One was the Guerrière, Louis Telin, master, with a crew of 104 men; the other was the Exchange, with a crew of 110. The British also took three merchant vessels, the schooner Diana and a brig, both laden with fish, and the sloop Brutus, laden with coffee. Reindeer and Pert went on to recapture two vessels, one of them English, that privateers had taken and were trying to bring into Samana.

Early the next year, on 16 January 1809, Franchise captured the French letter of marque Iphigenie after a chase of 30 hours. She was pierced for 18 guns but only carrying six, all of which, together with her anchors, she had thrown overboard during the chase. She and her crew of 26 were sailing from Bayonne, where she had been launched two months earlier, to Guadeloupe with a cargo of naval stores and provisions, with the intent of taking up privateering once in the West Indies. Dashwood, in the hope that the navy might buy her, described Iphigenie as "... coppered, and sails remarkably fast, having been pursued several Times during her Passage". (Note: It is believed that the Royal Navy did buy her, but there is no record of her service. Winfield provides a date of capture for an Iphigenie on 28 November 1808.)

=== Sinking of the transport John & Jane ===
Captain John Allen was appointed to replace Dashwood on 17 February 1809. Allen sailed Franchise to Newfoundland on 18 May 1810. On 9 February 1811 Allen sailed her for the Mediterranean.

It was on the way to the Mediterranean on 21 February that a great tragedy occurred. Franchise and her convoy were in Falmouth Roads on a stormy night when she ran into the transport John & Jane, under the command of Captain Grimbsy, almost cutting John & Jane in two. The conditions were too severe to launch boats and the damage to the transport was so complete that almost all aboard her drowned. She was carrying elements of the 11th Regiment of Foot, 197 of whom died, as did 15 women, six children, and six seamen; 20 soldiers and eight seamen survived. Franchise had signaled that she was about to tack and had John & Jane responded with lights the accident might have been averted. Franchise herself suffered little damage and no casualties.

On 1 August 1811 Allen transferred to Rodney. His replacement was Captain Robert Buck.

In 1812 Franchise was still in the Mediterranean. On 2 February she was in the bay of Cagliari where she captured the French privateer Aventurier (or Venturier), pierced for 14 guns but only mounting three. She and her crew of 60 men were 26 days out of Marseilles but had not captured anything.

Captain Thomas Usher replaced Buck in June. On 26 September, Blake and Franchise provided naval support to a land attack, at night, on Tarragona by troops under the command of General Joaquín Ibáñez Cuevas, Baron d'Eroles. The attack was successful, and resulted, inter alia, in the capture of several small vessels. The Spanish troops suffered three men killed and eight wounded; the British had no casualties whatsoever. Captain Edward Codrington, of Blake, wrote to Baron d'Eroles and to Admiral Sir Edward Pellew, Commander-in-Chief in the Mediterranean, that the officers and crew declined any prize money from the action, in favour of the Spanish troops, "in admiration of the valour and the discipline which they shewed upon the occasion."

== Fate ==
Franchise was in ordinary at Woolwich in 1815. She was put up for sale at Deptford in January of that year. Anyone wishing to purchase her had to put up a bond of two sureties, for £3000, not to sell or otherwise dispose of the ship. To regain their sureties the purchaser had to break her up within twelve months from the day of sale.
