= French frigate Médée (1778) =

French and British naval frigate 1778–1805

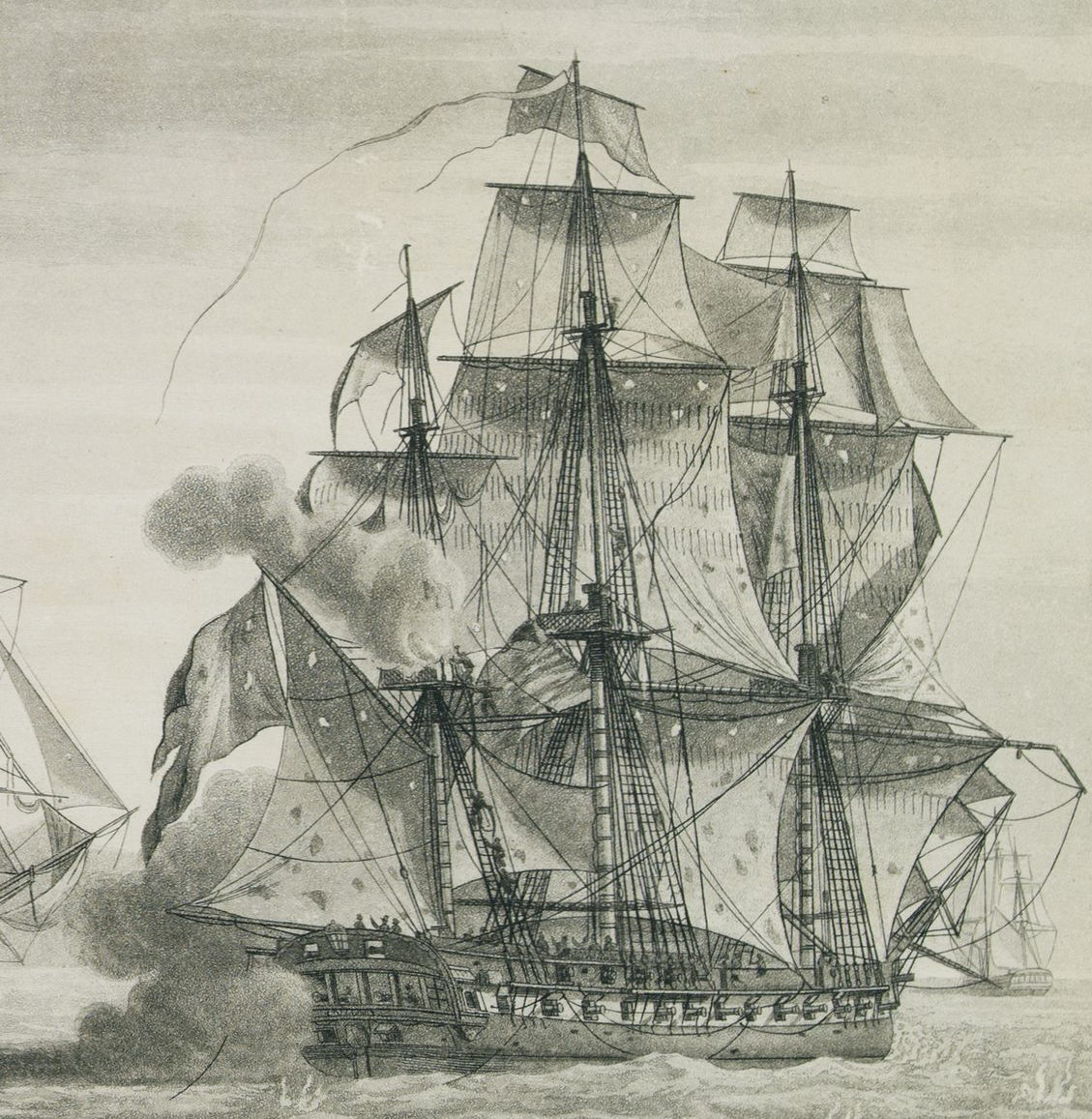
- Bellone, Médée's sister ship

History

France
- Name: Médée
- Namesake: Medea
- Builder: Saint-Malo
- Laid down: January 1778
- Launched: 20 September 1778
- In service: February 1779
- Captured: 4 August 1800

Great Britain
- Name: Medee
- Acquired: 4 August 1800 by capture
- Fate: Hulk in 1802; Broken up 1805

General characteristics
- Class & type: Iphigénie-class frigate
- Displacement: 1,150 tonneaux
- Tons burthen: 620 port tonneaux
- Length: 44.2 m (145 ft)
- Beam: 11.2 m (37 ft)
- Draught: 4.9 m (16 ft)
- Sail plan: Full-rigged ship
- Armament: 28 × 18-pounder long guns + 4 × 6-pounder long guns

Médée was a 32-gun Iphigénie-class frigate of the French Navy. The British captured her at the action of 4 August 1800 and took her into service as HMS Medee, but never commissioned her into the Royal Navy, instead using her as a prison ship.

== Career ==
She took part in the Battle of Tory Island.

She was part of a squadron of three frigates, Concorde under Commodore Jean-François Landolphe, Médée under Captain Jean-Daniel Coudin and Franchise under Captain Pierre Jurien, with Landolphe as the overall commander, that left Rochefort on 6 March 1799. Eluding the British blockade off Rochefort, the squadron sailed southwards until it reached the coast of West Africa. There Landolphe's ships began an extended commerce raiding operation, inflicting severe damage on the West African trade for the rest of the year. During this time, the squadron captured the Portuguese island of Prince (Príncipe). Eventually the strain of serving in tropical waters told on the ships and all three were forced to undergo an extensive refit in the nearest available allied shipyards, which were located in the Spanish-held River Plate in South America. At Montevideo the squadron assisted the French prisoners that had captured and taken into that port the convict transport Lady Shore that was carrying them to Australia.

Repairs continued for six months, until Landolphe considered the squadron once again ready to sail in the early summer of 1800. The squadron almost immediately captured off the coast of Brazil the American schooner Espérance (Hope), which they used as an aviso and sent to Cayenne with a prize crew under the command of enseigne de vaisseau Hamon. (At the time, France and the United States had been engaged for two years in the Quasi War.)

== Fate ==
The East Indiamen Exeter and Bombay Castle, supported by the fourth rate HMS Belliqueux, captured Médée off Rio de Janeiro at the action of 4 August 1800. The British sailed her to a port in Britain. She was never commissioned but served in 1802 as a prison hulk. She was sold in 1805.
