= Jean-François Landolphe =

French Navy officer and slave trader

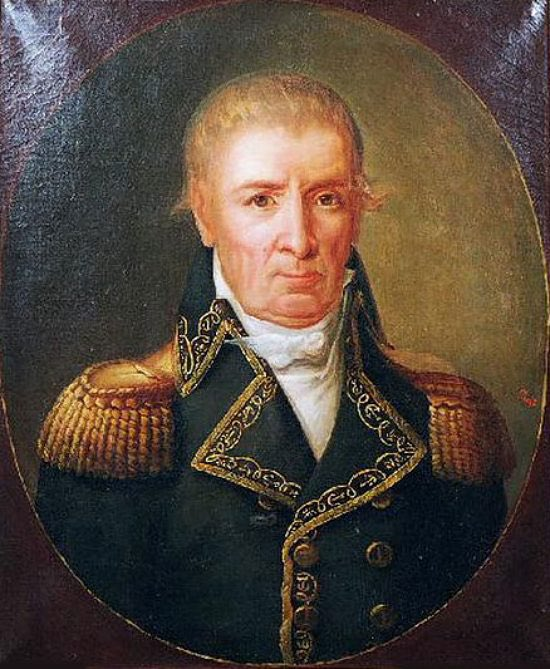
1870 portrait of Landolphe by Joseph Piazza

Jean-François Landolphe (5 February 1747 – 13 July 1825) was a French Navy officer and slave trader. In 1786 he was sent to the coast of Africa to set up trading posts as part of the Atlantic slave trade. He was defeated by a British force in the action of 4 August 1800. He published his Memoires in 1823.
