= List of ship launches in 1793 =

The list of ship launches in 1793 includes a chronological list of some ships launched in 1793.

Date	Ship	Class	Builder	Location	Country	Notes
14 January	Anna	East Indiaman	George Foreman & Nathaniel Bacon	Calcutta	India	For British East India Company.
26 January	Vulcano	San Carlo Borromeo-class ship of the line	Andrea Chiribiri	Venice	Republic of Venice	For Venetian Navy.
9 February	Resolution	Schooner		Marquesas Keys	United States	For Josiah Roberts.
12 February	Babet	Prompte-class corvette	Pierre Mauger	Le Havre	France	For French Navy.
28 February	Medea	Leon Trionfante-class ship of the line	Zuanne Novello	Venice	Republic of Venice	For Venetian Navy.
26 April	Brave	Brave-class Corvette		Le Havre	France	For French Navy.
27 April	Insurgente	Sémillante-class frigate	Pierre-Joseph Pénétreau	Lorient	France	For French Navy.
8 May	Tigre	Téméraire-class ship of the line	Honore-Sébastian Vial du Clairbois	Brest	France	For French Navy.
15 May	Evropa	Aziia-class ship of the line	F. Ignatyev	Arkhangelsk	Russia	For Imperial Russian Navy.
21 May	Carmagnole	Hébé-class frigate		Brest	France	For French Navy.
May	Experiment	Lugger	John Parkin	Plymouth	Great Britain	For Royal Navy.
May	Volage	Vésuve-class gunbrig	Lemarchand	Saint-Malo	France	For French Navy.
May	Prévoyante	Sixth rate	Raymond-Antoine Haran	Bayonne	France	For French Navy.
May	Vésuve	Vésuve-class gunbrig	Le Marchand	Saint-Malo	France	For French Navy.
6 June	Dédaigneuse	Dédaigneuse-class gunboat	Hubert Pennevert	Rochefort	France	For French Navy.
6 June	Subtile	Dédaigneuse-class gunboat	Hubert Pennevert	Rochefort	France	For French Navy.
8 June	Sans Pareil	Tonnant-class ship of the line		Brest	France	For French Navy.
30 June	Charente Inférieure	Galathée-class frigate		Rochefort	France	For French Navy.
June	Renard	Schooner	Michel Colin-Olivier	Dieppe	France	For French Navy.
17 July	Trompeuse	Brig-sloop	Jean Fouache	Le Havre	France	For French Navy.
24 July	Aventurier	Corvette		Honfleur	France	For French Navy.
24 July	Francis	Schooner		Sydney Cove	(Kingdom of Great Britain) New South Wales	For the Governor of New South Wales.
24 July	Hawke	Hawke-class sloop	Martin Ware	Deptford Dockyard	Great Britain	For Royal Navy.
26 July	Pospeshnyi	Fifth rate	I. V. Dolzhnikov	Taganrog	Russia	For Imperial Russian Navy.
July	Cruelle	Vésuve-class gunbrig	Le Marchand	Saint-Malo	France	For French Navy.
July	Gironde	Dédaigneuse-class gun-brig	Hubert Pennevert	Rochefort	France	For French Navy.
July	Île de Ré	Dédaigneuse-class gunboat	Hubert Pennevert	Rochefort	France	For French Navy.
6 August	Tetis	Fifth rate		Ferrol	Spain	For Spanish Navy.
9 August	Normoutier	Dédaigneuse-class gunboat	Hubert Pennevert	Rochefort	France	For French Navy.
9 August	Île d'Yeu	Dédaigneuse-class gunboat	Hubert Pennevert	Rochefort	France	For French Navy.
17 August	Lady Shore	Barque		Hull	Great Britain	For Thomas Walton Jr.
23 August	Amarante	Brig	Joseph-Augustin Normand	Honfleur	France	For French Navy.
23 August	Papillon	Cerf-Volant-class brig		Nantes	France	For French Navy.
26 August	Friendship	Merchantman	William & John Wells	Rotherhithe	Great Britain	For Oldham & Co.
August	Protectrice	Vésuve-class gunbrig	Le Marchand	Saint-Malo	France	For French Navy.
2 September	Suffisante	Amarante-class brig	Louis Deros	Le Havre	France	For French Navy.
18 September	Schastlivyi	Fifth rate	A. S. Katsanov	Kherson	Russia	For Imperial Russian Navy.
23 September	Alligator	Merchantman	Thomas Pitcher	Northfleet	Great Britain	For Robert Curling.
2 October	Legkii	Sixth rate	A. P. Sokolov	Nicholaieff	Russia	For Imperial Russian Navy.
5 October	Swift	Hawke-class sloop	Edward Tippett	Portsmouth Dockyard	Great Britain	For Royal Navy.
8 October	Alert	Pylades-class ship-sloop	John Randall & Co.	Rotherhithe	Great Britain	For Royal Navy.
24 October	Naïade	Brig		Brest	France	For French Navy.
October	Bonnet Rouge	Cutter		Saint-Malo	France	For French Navy.
October	Jean Bart	Révolutionnaire-class corvette		Saint-Malo	France	For French Navy.
October	Hargneuse	Vésuve-class gunbrig	Le Marchand	Saint-Malo	France	For French Navy.
6 November	Minotaur	Courageux-class ship of the line		Woolwich Dockyard	Great Britain	For Royal Navy.
16 November	Caesar	Third rate		Plymouth Dockyard	Great Britain	For Royal Navy.
18 November	Fraternité	Corvette		Brest	France	For French Navy.
19 November	Albacore	Pylades-class ship-sloop	Randall	Rotherhithe	Great Britain	For Royal Navy.
19 November	Boddingtons	Merchantman	William Mellish	Limehouse	Great Britain	For Boddingtons.
13 December	Seine	Seine-class frigate		Le Havre	France	For French Navy.
19 December	Pallas	Fifth rate	John Tovery	Woolwich Dockyard	Great Britain	For Royal Navy.
26 December	Exeter	Merchantman	George Foreman & Nathaniel Bacon	Calcutta	India	For private owner.
30 December	Belliqueuse	Belliqueuse-class brig	Michel Colin-Olivier	Dieppe	France	For French Navy.
Unknown date	Affiance	Merchantman	John & Philip Laing	Sunderland	Great Britain	For private owner.
Unknown date	Antelope	Brig		Bombay	India	For British East India Company.
Unknown date	Asar-i Nusret	Third rate	Ismail Kalfa	Constantinople	Ottoman Empire	For Ottoman Navy.
Unknown date	Aurora	West Indiaman		Chester	Great Britain	For Kensington & Co.
Unknown date	Beaver	Merchantman		River Thames	Great Britain	For private owner.
Unknown date	Betsy	West Indiaman		Lancaster	Great Britain	For Mr. Cobham.
Unknown date	Bombay	East Indiaman	Jamsetjee Bomanjee Wadia	Bombay	India	For British East India Company.
Unknown date	Bridport Packet	Sloop	Nicholas Bools	Bridport	Great Britain	For Nicholas Bools, George Browne and others.
Unknown date	Columbus	West Indiaman		Beaulieu River	Great Britain	For Mr. Timperon.
Unknown date	Crown	West Indiaman	William Rowe	Newcastle upon Tyne	Great Britain	For private owner.
Unknown date	Eagle	Schooner		Savannah, Georgia	United States	For Revenue Cutter Service.
Unknown date	Ejder-i Bahri	Third rate	Nevsim Kalfa	Gemlik	Ottoman Empire	For Ottoman Navy.
Unknown date	Eugénie	Privateer		Nantes	France	For private owner.
Unknown date	Fly	Brig		Bombay	India	For British East India Company.
Unknown date	Freja	Fifth rate	Ernst Wilhelm Stibolt	Copenhagen	Denmark-Norway	For Dano-Norwegian Navy.
Unknown date	Gazal-ı Bahri	Fifth rate	Kara Yorgi Kalfa	Kemer	Ottoman Empire	For Ottoman Navy.
Unknown date	Good Design	Merchantman	Thomas Hearn	North Shields	Great Britain	For Hurry & Co.
Unknown date	Goodrich	Brig		Bermuda	(Kingdom of Great Britain) Bermuda	For private owner.
Unknown date	Hannah	Merchantman	H. and T. Barrick	Whitby	Great Britain	For Robert Hodgson.
Unknown date	Happy Return	Sloop	Nicholas Bools	Bridport	Great Britain	For Nicholas Bools.
Unknown date	Hart	Cutter		Deptford	Great Britain	For Board of Customs.
Unknown date	Horta	Brig	John & Phillip Laing	Sunderland	Great Britain	For Captain Forster.
Unknown date	Hümay-ı Zafer	Fourth rate	Dimitri Kalfa	Constantinople	Ottoman Empire	For Ottoman Navy.
Unknown date	Huron	Privateer		Bordeaux	France	For private owner.
Unknown date	Juno	Merchantman		Hull	Great Britain	For private owner.
Unknown date	La Ferme	Third rate		Barcelona	Spain	For Spanish Navy.
Unknown date	Lanrishe	Galiot	Nicholas Bools	Bridport	Great Britain	For Mr. Livingstone.
Unknown date	Loyalist	Merchantman	Temple	South Shields	Great Britain	For private owner.
Unknown date	Lutchmy	Merchantman	Gabriel Gillet	Calcutta	India	For private owner.
Unknown date	Massachusetts II	Sloop	Adna Bates	Cohasset, Massachusetts	United States	For Revenue Cutter Service.
Unknown date	Nesim-i Zafer	Fifth rate	Antuvan Kalfa	Rhodes	(Ottoman Empire) Ottoman Greece	For Ottoman Navy.
Unknown date	Peggy	Barque	Gillet & Co.	Calcutta	India	For private owner.
Unknown date	Pertev-i Nusret	Third rate	Nikoli Kalfa	Sinop	Ottoman Empire	For Ottoman Navy.
Unknown date	Poulette	Privateer		Caribbean Sea		For Private owner.
Unknown date	Prinz Fredrik	East Indiaman		Amsterdam	Dutch Republic	For Dutch East India Company.
Unknown date	Prince of Wales	Merchantman	Randall & Brent	Rotherhithe	Great Britain	For Hudson's Bay Company.
Unknown date	Quaker	West Indiaman		Tynemouth	Great Britain	For Mr. Blackman.
Unknown date	Recovery	West Indiaman		Liverpool	Great Britain	For Richard Watt.
Unknown date	Républicaine	Merchantman		Le Havre	France	For private owner.
Unknown date	Robert	Privateer		Nantes	France	For private owner.
Unknown date	Şehbaz-i Bahri	Third rate	Nikoli Kalfa	Bodrum	Ottoman Empire	For Ottoman Navy.
Unknown date	Şiar-i Nusret	Fourth rate	Antuvan Kalfa	Rhodes	(Ottoman Empire) Ottoman Greece	For Ottoman Navy.
Unknown date	South Carolina	Schooner			United States	For Revenue Cutter Service.
Unknown date	Sovereign	West Indiaman			Great Britain	For A. Towers.
Unknown date	Strombolo	Ketch		Bombay Dockyard	India	For Bombay Marine.
Unknown date	Thetis	West Indiaman	John & William Wells	Rotherhithe	Great Britain	For Long & Co.
Unknown date	Thornton	Cutter		Southampton	Great Britain	For Sierra Leone Company.
Unknown date	Tuscan	Merchantman		Hull	Great Britain	For Mr. Donoghue.
Unknown date	Tyrannicide	Téméraire-class ship of the line		Lorient	France	For French Navy.
Unknown date	Upton Castle	Merchantman		Bombay Dockyard	India	For H Bomanjee & Thomas Bomanjee.
Unknown date	Vaillante	Vésuve-class gunbrig		Saint-Malo	France	For French Navy.
Unknown date	Vénus	Privateer			West Indies	For private owner.
Unknown date	Victoire	Privateer			Dutch Republic	For private owner.
Unknown date	Name unknown	Merchantman			France	For private owner.
Unknown date	Name unknown	Merchantman			Spain	For private owner.
Unknown date	Name unknown	Merchantman		Spain or United States	Unknown	For private owner.
Unknown date	Name unknown	Merchantman		Providence, Rhode Island	United States	For private owner.
Unknown date	Name unknown	Merchantman		Kirkcaldy	Great Britain	For private owner.
Unknown date	Name unknown	Merchantman			France	For private owner.
Unknown date	Name unknown	Merchantman			France	For private owner.
Unknown date	Name unknown	Merchantman		Ostend	Dutch Republic	For private owner.
Unknown date	Name unknown	Merchantman			France	For private owner.
