= HMS Tartarus (1797) =

History

Great Britain
- Name: Charles Jackson
- Builder: Edward Mosley, Howdon, Newcastle upon Tyne
- Launched: 1792
- Fate: Sold 1797

Great Britain
- Acquired: April 1797 by purchase
- Honours and awards: NGSM with clasp "Egypt"
- Fate: Wrecked 20 December 1804

General characteristics
- Tons burthen: 333, or 34426/94 (bm)
- Length: Overall:94 ft 6 in (28.8 m); Keel:79 ft 10 in (24.3 m)
- Beam: 28 ft 6 in (8.7 m)
- Depth of hold: 12 ft 2 in (3.7 m)
- Complement: 67
- Armament: Mercantile: 2 × 12-pounder + 8 × 6-pounder guns; Royal Navy; Upper deck: 4 × 68-pounder carronades; QD: 4 × 18-pounder carronades; Fc: 4 × 18-pounder carronades; 2 × 10" mortars

HMS Tartarus was the mercantile Charles Jackson, launched in 1792 at Newcastle. She traded with Saint Petersburg until the British Royal Navy purchased her in 1797 and converted her to a bomb vessel. She served in two campaigns before she was lost in a gale on 20 December 1804.

== Merchantman ==
Charles Jackson first appeared in Lloyd's Register (LR) in 1793.

Year	Master	Owner	Trade	Source
1793	Moody	Jackson	London–Petersburg	LR
1797	J.Eilley	C.Jackson	London–Petersburg	LR

== Royal Navy ==
The Navy purchased Charles Jackson in April 1797 and had her fitted at Chatham between 28 April and 9 September for service as a bomb vessel. Commander Samuel Kempthorne commissioned HMS Tartarus in July. Commander Thomas Hand replaced Kempthorne in October.

In May 1798 Tartarus participated in Sir Home Riggs Popham's expedition to Ostend to destroy the sluice gates of the Ostend-Bruge Canal. The expedition landed 1,300 troops under Major General Coote. The army contingent blew up the locks and gates of the canal, but due to unfavourable winds preventing re-embarkation, Coote and the men under his command were then forced to surrender.

Tartarus participated in the navy's Egyptian campaign (8 March to 2 September 1801). Tartarus supported the Army's landing at Aboukir Bay (Battle of Abukir (1801)). Negresse, the schooner Malta and the cutter Entreprenante protected the left flank. The gunboats Dangereuse and Janissary, and the cutter Cruelle protected the right flank. The bomb vessels Tartarus and Fury were positioned where they could use their mortars to fire shells. Consequently, her officers and crew qualified for the clasp "Egypt" to the Naval General Service Medal (NGSM), which the Admiralty issued in 1847 to all surviving claimants. (Note: A first-class share of the prize money awarded in April 1823 was worth £34 2s 4d; a fifth-class share, that of an able seaman, was worth 3s 11½d. The amount was small as the total had to be shared between 79 vessels and the entire army contingent.)

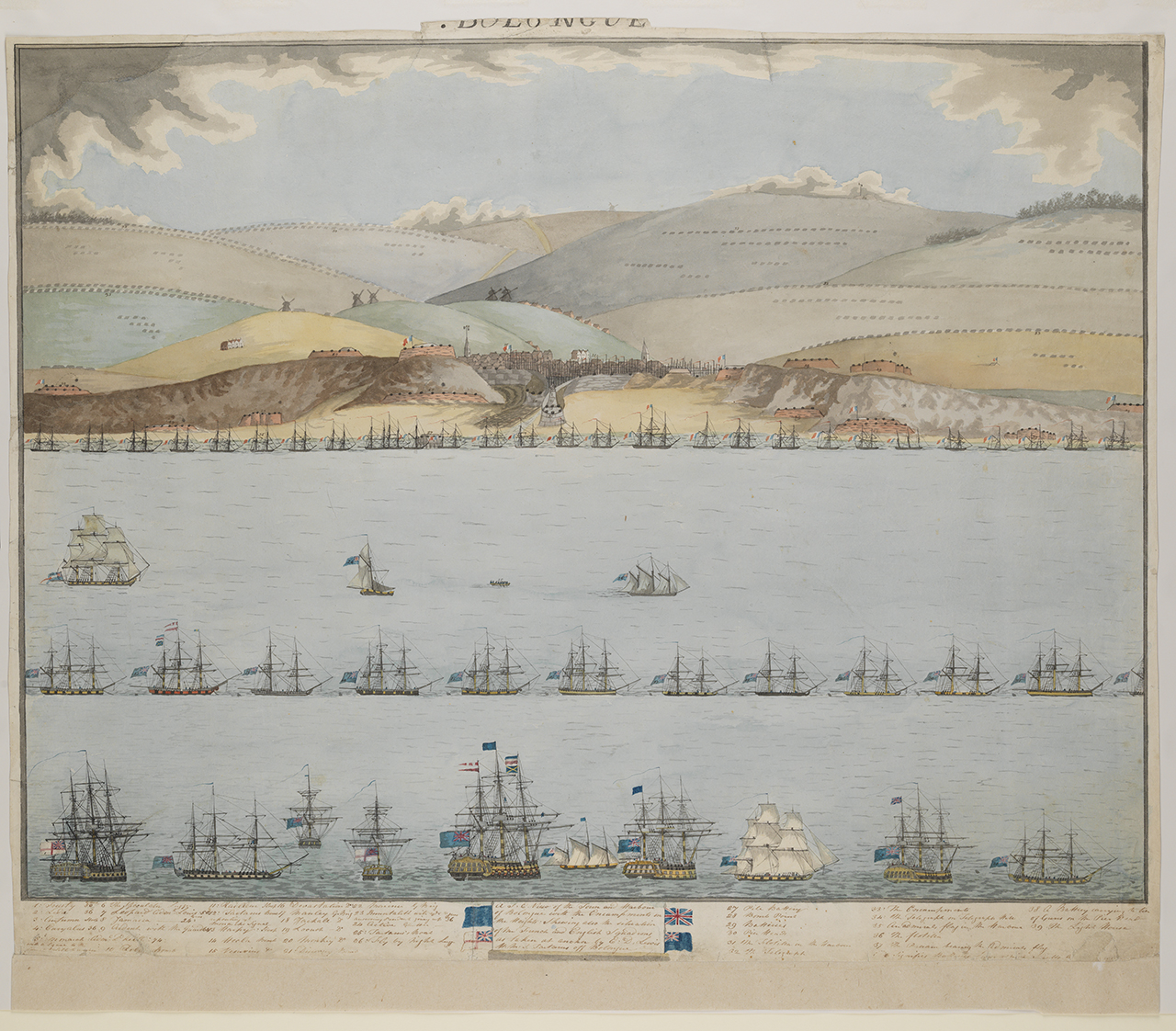
Tarturus at the attack on Boulogne October 1804

Between June and August 1803 Tartarus underwent fitting at Woolwich. Commander Francis Temple commissioned her in July for the Downs. Commander Mauritius de Stark replaced Temple in 1804, and was himself replaced in June by Commander Thomas Withers.

== Fate ==
A gale on 20 December 1804 wrecked Tartarus on Margate Sands. She had been at anchor to ride out the gale but drifted on to the sands when her cables parted. Two local fishing boats came out and rescued some sick men though one drowned when a boat overturned as they were being transferred. At low water she lay high and dry, but heeled over. At high water, the sea entered and all her remaining crew were taken off. She then disappeared beneath the sea with only the tops of her mast showing. The subsequent court martial admonished the officer of the watch for having gone below during his watch and advised him to be more careful in the future. It criticized the master's mate for inattention during his watch and ordered him to be reprimanded and to lose six months seniority.
