= French ship Vésuve =

Five ships of the French Navy have borne the name Vésuve in honour of Mount Vesuvius:

== Ships ==
- Vésuve (1756), a Terreur-class bombship.
- Vésuve (1793), a gunbrig, lead ship of her class. Captured in 1795 and taken into the British Royal Navy as HMS Vesuve; sold 1802.
- Vésuve (1794), a tartane.
- Vésuve (1795), an Etna-class corvette.
- Vésuve (1825), a bomb vessel, lead ship of her class.

== See also ==
- HMS Vesuvius

== Notes and references ==
=== Bibliography ===
- Roche, Jean-Michel (2005). Dictionnaire des bâtiments de la flotte de guerre française de Colbert à nos jours. Vol. 1. Group Retozel-Maury Millau. p. 461. ISBN 978-2-9525917-0-6. OCLC 165892922.
