= Boyne (1787 ship) =

History

United States
- Builder: Philadelphia
- Launched: 1779
- Fate: Sold c. 1787

Great Britain
- Name: Boyne
- Owner: 1788:Alexander Willock; 1791:J.E. Colley (Note: James Eckley Colley, John Houghton, Thomas Rigmaiden, Benjamin Hammond, Joseph Ward, William Begg, & Charles Wilson.)
- Acquired: c.1787 by purchase
- Fate: Captured 1794

General characteristics
- Tons burthen: 200, or 205, or 226, (bm)
- Complement: 20
- Armament: 12 × 4-pounder guns

Boyne was launched at Philadelphia in 1779, possibly under that name. She first appeared in Lloyd's Register as Boyne in 1789, but had probably been purchased in 1787, and had already made one voyage by 1789. She made three voyages in all as a slave ship before a French privateer captured her in 1794, on her fourth.

== Slave voyage #1 (1788-1789) ==
Captain John Hay sailed from London on 8 February 1788, bound for the Gold Coast. Boyne started gathering captives at Cape Coast Castle on 21 June. She left Africa on 4 March 1789 and arrived at St John's, Antigua. She had embarked 330 captives and she landed 311, for a loss rate of 5.8%.

Boyne appears in Lloyd's Register in 1789, with J. Hays, master, changing to G. Greaves, and owner A. Willcock. She had been coppered in 1787, and underwent a good repair in 1789.

== Slave voyage #2 (1789-1791) ==
Captain George Greaves sailed from Liverpool on 16 December 1789, bound for the Gold Coast. Boyne gathered captives at Cape Coast Castle and left Africa 3 February 1791. She delivered her captives to St John's in April. She had embarked 300 captives and she landed 268, for a loss rate of 10.7%. Boyne returned to Liverpool on 7 June.

== Slave voyage #3 (1791–1792) ==
Captain John Thornborrow sailed from Liverpool on 27 October 1791. She started gathering captives at Calabar on 28 December, and left Africa on 7 April 1792. She arrived at Grenada on 24 June, where she landed 279 captives. At some point Captain James Bowie replaced Thornborrow. Boyne left Grenada on 16 July, and arrived back at Liverpool on 22 August. She had left Liverpool with 22 crew members and she suffered three crew deaths on the voyage.

== Capture ==
War with France broke out in early 1793. Lloyd's Register for 1794 showed Boyne's master changing from Thornburgh to J. Mill, and her owner as J.E. Colley. Captain John Mills acquired a letter of marque on 16 June 1794. Boyne sailed from Liverpool on 28 June 1794.

The French Naïade-class brig-corvette Fraternité, captured Boyne, Mill, master, off Cape Clear as Boyne was sailing from Liverpool for Africa. Fraternité was armed with twelve 18-pounder guns and six swivel guns. She also had a crew of 146 men. (Note: Fraternité had been launched at Brest Dockyard. The Royal Navy captured her two classmates and they became HMS Melville and HMS Diligente.)
