= Lady Shore (ship) =

At least two vessels have borne the name Lady Shore, named for Lady Charlotte Shore, wife of Sir John Shore. Because these two vessels were launched within a year of each other, they are frequently conflated. Hackman conflates the second of these vessels with the Lady Shore launched at Calcutta in 1803.

- Lady Shore (1793 ship) was launched in 1793 at Hull, made two voyages for the British East India Company, during the second of which a French privateer captured and looted her before letting her go. She then traded, primarily with the West Indies, until she was lost in 1815 in the St Lawrence.
- Lady Shore (1794 ship) was launched at Calcutta in 1794 and made one trip transporting convicts to Australia during which the convicts mutinied and took over the ship.
- Lady Shore (1803 ship) was a ship of 557 tons (bm), launched at Calcutta in 1803. She was sold at the Cape of Good Hope and renamed Henry Dundas. She was lost in the Hooghly River on 3 April 1823.
