= French corvette Fraternité (1793) =

Fraternité
History

France
- Name: Fraternité
- Builder: Brest Dockyard
- Laid down: May 1793
- Launched: 18 November 1793
- Renamed: Festin (May 1795)
- Fate: Struck 1813 following grounding

General characteristics
- Displacement: 270/461 tons (French) unladen/laden
- Length: 31.75 m (104.2 ft) (overall)
- Beam: 8.31 m (27.3 ft)
- Depth of hold: 4.17 m (13.7 ft)
- Complement: French service:187
- Armament: Originally:12 × 18-pounder guns; 1806:8 × 6-pounder guns; 1808:14 × 12-pounder guns

French corvette Fraternité was a Naïade-class brig-corvette launched in 1793. She had a brief sailing career. In May 1795, she was renamed Festin. She then served in a number of non-operational roles until she was struck in 1813.

== Sea service ==
Lloyd's List reported on 29 July 1794 that Fraternité had captured Boyne, Mill, master, off Cape Clear as Boyne was sailing from Liverpool for Africa to gather slaves. Fraternité was armed with twelve 18-pounder guns and six swivel guns; she had a crew of 146 men.

== Later service ==
In May 1795 Fraternité was renamed Festin. In July 1804 she was a barracks hulk at Brest. She was recommissioned in June 1806 at Brest as a training and station ship and re-rated a brig-corvette. In 1808 she was described as a brig. In January 1812 she served as an annex to the naval school ship Tourville. She received a third mast for training duties.

== Fate ==
Festin grounded in Brest harbour on 13 June 1813. Although there was little damage, she was struck from the lists.

== See also ==
- French corvette Naïade (1793)
- French corvette Diligente (1794)
