= List of shipwrecks in June 1828 =

The list of shipwrecks in June 1828 includes all ships sunk, foundered, grounded, or otherwise lost during June 1828.

== 3 June ==
List of shipwrecks: 3 June 1828
Ship	State	Description
Active	United Kingdom	The whaler foundered off the North Cape, Iceland with the loss of eight of her crew. Survivors were rescued by a Danish vessel.

== 5 June ==
List of shipwrecks: 5 June 1828
Ship	State	Description
Alert	United Kingdom	The sloop was destroyed by fire 4 leagues (12 nautical miles (22 km) east of Inchcape. Her crew were rescued by Myrtle (United Kingdom).
Dove	(United Kingdom of Great Britain and Ireland) New South Wales	The cutter was wrecked north of Port Stephens with the loss of seven lives. She was on a voyage from Sydney to Newcastle.

== 6 June ==
List of shipwrecks: 6 June 1828
Ship	State	Description
Margaret	United Kingdom	The sloop was wrecked at Covesea, Morayshire. Her crew were rescued.
Monarch	United Kingdom	The ship foundered in the Norwegian Sea with the loss of six of her ten crew. Survivors were rescued by Thompson (United Kingdom).
Pilot	United Kingdom	The schooner capsized in a squall off Souter Point, Northumberland. Her crew survived. Pilot was later towed in to Sunderland, County Durham.

== 8 June ==
List of shipwrecks: 8 June 1828
Ship	State	Description
Hunter	New South Wales	The schooner was driven ashore on Entry Island (Kapiti Island), New Zealand during heavy weather.

== 11 June ==
List of shipwrecks: 11 June 1828
Ship	State	Description
Mary Ann	United Kingdom	The ship ran aground on the Barber Sand, in the North Sea off the coast of Norfolk. She was refloated but found to be leaking and was consequently beached at Great Yarmouth, Norfolk. Mary Ann was on a voyage from Great Yarmouth to Newcastle upon Tyne, Northumberland.

== 14 June ==
List of shipwrecks: 14 June 1828
Ship	State	Description
Dolphin	United Kingdom	The ship foundered in the Irish Sea 12 nautical miles (22 km) off Strangford, County Down. Her crew were rescued. She was on a voyage from Bangor, Caernarfonshire to Belfast, County Antrim.

== 15 June ==
List of shipwrecks: 15 June 1828
Ship	State	Description
Ada	United Kingdom	The ship was driven ashore at the Cape of Good Hope.
Importer	United Kingdom	The ship was driven ashore at the Cape of Good Hope.
Orange Grove	United Kingdom	The ship was driven ashore and severely damaged at the Cape of Good Hope.
Walsingham	United Kingdom	The ship was driven ashore and wrecked the Cape of Good Hope.

== 16 June ==
List of shipwrecks: 16 June 1828
Ship	State	Description
Betsey	United Kingdom	The ship foundered in the North Sea off Cromer, Norfolk. Her crew were rescued by Adventure (United Kingdom). She was on a voyage from Sunderland, County Durham to Newhaven, Sussex.

== 17 June ==
List of shipwrecks: 17 June 1828
Ship	State	Description
John	United Kingdom	The ship was driven ashore on Partridge Island, Nova Scotia, British North America.

== 20 June ==
List of shipwrecks: 20 June 1828
Ship	State	Description
Enterprise	United Kingdom	The whaler struck an iceberg and foundered in the Davis Straits. Her crew were rescued.
Traveller	United Kingdom	The ship collided in the Atlantic Ocean with Hercules (United Kingdom and foundered with the loss of a crew member.

== 23 June ==
List of shipwrecks: 23 June 1828
Ship	State	Description
Alice	United Kingdom	The ship was lost near St. Andrew, New Brunswick, British North America.
St. Elizabeth	United Kingdom	The ship was lost in the Magdalen Islands, Lower Canada, British North America. Her crew were rescued. She was on a voyage from Chaleur Bay, Quebec City, Lower Canada to Liverpool, Lancashire.

== 25 June ==
List of shipwrecks: 25 June 1828
Ship	State	Description
Victory	United Kingdom	The brig was caught fire in the Atlantic Ocean (18°17′N 46°50′W). She was abandoned by her fifteen crew the next day and was then totally destroyed. Victory was on a voyage from London to Barbados.

== 29 June ==
List of shipwrecks: 29 June 1828
Ship	State	Description
Padang	Netherlands	The ship was driven ashore at the Cape of Good Hope. She became a wreck on 1 July. Padang was on a voyage from Padang, Netherlands East Indies to Antwerp.

== 30 June ==
List of shipwrecks: 30 June 1828
Ship	State	Description
Agnes	(United Kingdom of Great Britain and Ireland) British North America	The ship was wrecked at Canso, Nova Scotia. She was on a voyage from Halifax to Fortuna Bay.

== Unknown date ==
List of shipwrecks: Unknown date in June 1828
Ship	State	Description
Henry Tate	United States	The ship sank in the Mississippi River at New Orleans, Louisiana.
Strabo	United Kingdom	The ship ran aground on Tory Island, County Donegal and was wrecked. She was on a voyage from Antigua to the Clyde.
Water Mole	(United Kingdom of Great Britain and Ireland) New South Wales	The ship was driven ashore and wrecked in mid-June. She was set afire to salvage ironwork.
