= List of ships named Boyne =

Several ships have been named Boyne after the Battle of the Boyne, 1690:

- Boyne (1787 ship) was launched at Philadelphia in 1779, possibly under that name. She first appears in Lloyd's Register as Boyne in 1789, but had probably been purchased in 1787 and had already made one voyage by 1789. She made three voyages in all as a slave ship before a French privateer captured her in 1794.
- Boyne (1807 ship) was launched at Calcutta in 1807. In 1809 she sailed to England. She was sold to the Danes, but by 1811 was under English ownership under the name Moffat (or Moffatt). She then made seven voyages as a "regular ship" for the British East India Company (EIC). After the EIC exited its maritime activities in 1833-34, Moffat made four voyages transporting convicts to Australia: one voyage to Port Jackson and three to Van Diemen's Land. She also made at least one voyage carrying immigrants to South Australia, and later regularly traded between Liverpool and Bombay. She was last listed in 1856.
- Boyne (1822 ship) was built in Newcastle upon Tyne as a West Indiaman. In 1824–1825 she made one voyage to Bengal for the British East India Company (EIC)). She next made one voyage to Bombay under a license from the EIC. She then returned to the West Indies trade. Her crew abandoned her on 18 August 1830 in a sinking state as she was sailing from Jamaica to London.
- Boyne (1877 ship) was a 1,403 ton, Nourse Line sailing ship that T.R. Oswald of Southampton built in 1877. She was referred to as the "Hoodoo Ship" for the number of mishaps that occurred to her. She wrecked in 1886.

== See also ==
- HMS Boyne - one of six ships of the British Royal Navy
