= Egyptian (1799 ship) =

British slave ship (1799–1806)

History

Great Britain
- Name: Egyptian
- Launched: 1788, France
- Acquired: 1799 by purchase of a prize
- Fate: Condemned 1806

General characteristics
- Tons burthen: 562, or 567 (bm)
- Complement: 1800: 35; 1804: 50
- Armament: 1800: 20 × 6-pounder + 2 × 12-pounder guns; 1804: 16 × 6-pounder guns + 2 × 18-pounder carronades

Egyptian was launched in 1788 in France. She was taken in prize circa 1799 and became a Liverpool-based slave ship. She made two complete voyages in the triangular trade in enslaved people. She was condemned at Jamaica after having delivered her captives on her third voyage.

== Career ==
Egyptian first appeared in Lloyd's Register (LR), in 1800.

Year	Master	Owner	Trade	Source
1800	J. Pince	Timperon	Liverpool–Africa	LR

1st voyage transporting enslaved people (1800–1801): Captain John Pince acquired a letter of marque on 23 July 1800. Captain Pince sailed from Liverpool on 7 August 1800. In 1800, 133 ships cleared from English ports for the enslaving trade; 120 of these sailed from Liverpool.

He acquired captives at Cape Coast Castle, Anomabu, and Winnabeck (Wiamba); Egyptian was reported "all well" at Winnabeck on 9 January 1801, together with another Timperon-owned ship, Ann, Riddle, master. She arrived at Kingston with 390 captives on 9 June 1801. She sailed from Kingston on 24 July, and arrived back at Liverpool on 21 September.

Year	Master	Owner	Trade	Source
1805	J. Pince; T.Cannel	Timperon	Liverpool–Africa	LR

2nd voyage transporting enslaved people (1804–1805): Captain Thomas Cannell acquired a letter of marque on 13 July 1804. Captain Cannell sailed from Liverpool on 31 July 1804. In 1804, 147 ships cleared from English ports for the enslaving trade; 126 of these sailed from Liverpool.

Captain Cannell acquired captives at Bonny and arrived at Kingston on 12 January 1805 with 329 captives. Egyptian sailed from Kingston on 25 March 1805 and arrived back at Liverpool on 6 June. She had left Liverpool with 49 crew members and she had suffered eight crew deaths on her voyage.

3rd voyage transporting enslaved people (1804–1805): Captain Cannell sailed from Liverpool on 16 August 1805. Egyptian embarked slaves at Bonny. She arrived at Kingston on 29 January 2806 with 392 slaves.

== Fate ==
Lloyd's List reported in June 1806 that Egyptian had been condemned at Kingston. The 1806 volume of the Register of Shipping (RS) carried the annotation "Condemned" by her name.
