= HMS Vesuvius =

Twelve ships of the Royal Navy have borne the name HMS Vesuvius or HMS Vesuve, after the volcano Mount Vesuvius. Another was planned but never completed, while doubt exists over the existence of another:

- HMS Vesuvius (1691) was an 8-gun fireship launched in 1691 and expended in 1693.
- HMS Vesuvius (1693) was an 8-gun fireship launched in 1693. She was stranded in 1695 but was refloated that year. She was condemned in 1705.
- HMS Vesuvius (1739) was a 16-gun fireship, previously the civilian Worcester. She was purchased in 1739 and broken up in 1742.
- HMS Vesuvius (1756) was an 8-gun fireship, previously the civilian King of Portugal. She was purchased in 1756, converted to a sloop that year, and was sold in 1763.
- HMS Vesuvius (1771) was an 8-gun fireship launched in 1771. She was converted to a sloop and renamed HMS Raven later that year and was sold in 1780.
- HMS Vesuvius (1776) was an 8-gun bomb vessel launched in 1776 and sold in 1812.
- HMS Vesuve (1795) was a 3-gun gunvessel captured from the French in 1795 and sold in 1802.
- HMS Vesuvius may have been an 8-gun bomb vessel purchased in 1797 and sold in 1813, though this may refer to the Vesuvius launched in 1776.
- HMS Vesuvius (1813) was an 8-gun bomb vessel launched in 1813 and sold in 1819.
- HMS Vesuvius was to have been an 8-gun bomb vessel. She was ordered in 1823, cancelled in 1828, reordered in 1830 and cancelled in 1831.
- HMS Vesuvius (1839) was a wooden paddle sloop launched in 1839 and sold for scrapping in 1865.
- HMS Vesuvius (1874) was an iron screw torpedo boat launched in 1874. She was sold in 1923 and foundered under tow to the breakers.
- HMS Vesuvius (1933) was a torpedo-discharge lighter purchased in 1933 and renamed TL1 in 1940.
- HMS Vesuvius was a minelaying tender launched in 1932 as HMS Skylark. She was renamed HMS Vernon in 1938 and HMS Vesuvius in 1941. She was sold in 1957.
