= Ann (1792 ship) =

British merchant and slave ship (1792–1810)

History

Great Britain
- Name: Ann
- Launched: 1792, Chester

General characteristics
- Tons burthen: 223, or 226(bm)
- Complement: 1793: 20; 1795: 28; 1796: 30; 1800: 30
- Armament: 1793: 10 × 3-pounder guns; 1795: 16 × 9-pounder guns; 1796: 16 × 3&6-pounder guns; 1800: 16 × 6-pounder guns; 1810: 2 × 9-pounder guns + 8 × 12-pounder carronades

Ann was launched at Chester in 1792 as a West Indiaman. From 1796, she made nine complete voyages as a slave ship in the triangular trade in enslaved people. She participated in several single ship actions. On her first voyage, she repelled an attack by a French privateer. On her second voyage, a privateer captured her but she was recaptured. On her ninth voyage, a French privateer again captured her, but this time her captor plundered and then released her. She sank on 24 May 1810 in the Old Dock at Liverpool, but was salvaged.

== Career ==
Ann first appeared in Lloyd's Register (LR) in 1792.

Year	Master	Owner	Trade	Source
1792	Ashcroft	Grayson	Liverpool–Jamaica	LR

After the outbreak of War with France, Captain Edmund Ashcroft acquired a letter of marque on 21 September 1793.

Year	Master	Owner	Trade	Source
1795	Ashcroft; Robert Wright	E.Grayson	Liverpool–Jamaica; Liverpool–Africa	LR

In 1795 Ann commenced the first of nine voyages transporting captives.

1st voyage transporting enslaved people (1795–1796): Captain Ruben (or Reuben) Wright acquired a letter of marque on 14 September 1795. He sailed from Liverpool on 30 September. In 1795, 79 vessels sailed from English ports, bound for the trade in enslaved people; 59 of these vessels sailed from Liverpool.

Ann acquired captives at Bonny and arrived at St Croix on 9 April 1796. Before landing her captives at St Croix, Ann, Wright, master, stopped at Barbados; on the way she had repelled an attack by a 16-gun privateer.

The attack took place on 20 March, windward of Barbados. The French privateer was a long schooner of 16 guns, plus swivel guns. She had a large complement. The engagement lasted two and a half hours before the privateer made off, badly damaged. Ann was too damaged to follow. Two men of crew of 25 had been slightly wounded.

Ann left St Croix on 30 May and arrived back at Liverpool on 6 July. She had left Liverpool with 28 crew members and suffered no crew deaths on her voyage.

At the time Saint Croix was a Danish colony. In 1792, the Danish government passed a law that would outlaw Danish participation in the trans-Atlantic enslaving trade, from early 1803 on. This led the government in the Danish West Indies to encourage the importation of captives prior to the ban taking effect. One measure that it took was to open the trade to foreign vessels. Records for the period 1796 to 1799 show that 24 British enslaving ships, most of them from Liverpool, arrived at St Croix and imported 6,781 captives.

Year	Master	Owner	Trade	Source
1796	R.Wright; R.Cateral	E.Grayson; T.Clark	Liverpool–Africa	LR

2nd voyage transporting enslaved people (1796): Captain Robert Cattaral acquired a letter of marque on 11 October 1796. He sailed from Liverpool on 19 October 1796. In 1796, 103 vessels sailed from English ports, bound for the trade in enslaved people; 74 of these vessels sailed from Liverpool.

Near Cap Finisterre, a French privateer captured Ann, Catteral, master, as Ann was on her way to Africa.

On 1 November 1796, Ann was at 42°30′N 16°00′W (near Cape Finisterre), when a privateer approached, but then sheered off. The next day the privateer returned. She was armed with twelve 9-pounder guns, six 6-pounder guns, and two swivel guns. She also had a crew of 90 men. An engagement of one hour ensued. Ann sustained extensive damage, though no casualties before her crew abandoned here defense and took refuge below decks. Captain Catteral and his officers, unable to defend her any longer, struck. The newspaper account describing the action, described the crew as consisting largely of Americans and foreigners.

Ann was recaptured.

Year	Master	Owner	Trade	Source
1798	T.Lee	Timperon	Liverpool–Africa	LR

Ann, Lee, master, made a voyage to the West Indies in 1798.

3rd voyage transporting enslaved people (1798–1799): Captain Thomas Lee sailed from Liverpool on 6 October 1798. In 1798, 160 vessels sailed from English ports, bound for the trade in enslaved people; 149 of these vessels sailed from Liverpool.

Ann gathered captives at Bonny and arrived at Kingston on 5 May 1799 with 359 captives. She arrived back at Liverpool on 17 September.

In the first half of 1800, Ann, Porteus, master, made a voyage between Liverpool and the West Indies.

4th voyage transporting enslaved people (1800–1801): Captain Robert Riddle acquired a letter of marque on 13 October 1800. He sailed from Liverpool on 6 November 1800. In 1800, 133 vessels sailed from English ports, bound for the trade in enslaved people; 120 of these vessels sailed from Liverpool.

On 17 December Ann was "all well" and in company with another Timperon-owned ship, Columbus, Cromarty, master, at 7°30′N 16°10′W as they were on their way to Africa. He first acquired captives at Cape Coast Castle, and then at Wiamba. Ann was reported "all well" at Winnabeck on 9 January 1801, together with another Timperon-owned ship, Egyptian, Pince, master. Ann arrived at Kingston, Jamaica on 3 June 1801 with 231 captives. She sailed from Kingston on 30 August and arrived back at Liverpool on 2 October. She had left Liverpool with 34 crew members and had arrived at Kingston with 25. In all, she had suffered three crew deaths on her voyage.

5th voyage transporting enslaved people (1802): Captain James Frodsham sailed from Liverpool on 1 April 1802. In 1802, 155 vessels sailed from English ports, bound for the trade in enslaved people; 122 of these vessels sailed from Liverpool.

Ann arrived at Demerara on 19 August with 243 captives. She arrived back at Liverpool on 20 October. She had left Liverpool with 28 crew members and had suffered no crew deaths on her voyage.

6th voyage transporting enslaved people (1802–1804): Captain James Frodsham sailed from Liverpool on 23 December 1802. In 1804, 147 vessels sailed from English ports, bound for the trade in enslaved people; 126 of these vessels sailed from Liverpool.

Captain Frodsham acquired captives at Accra, but primarily elsewhere in the Bight of Benin. Captain Frodsham died on 4 January 1804. Ann (late Frodsham), Joseph Porteus, master, arrived at Kingston on 11 February from Africa and Barbados. She sailed from Kingston on 15 April and arrived back at Liverpool on 1 June. She had left Liverpool with 31 crew members and had suffered two crew deaths on her voyage.

7th voyage transporting enslaved people (1804–1805): Captain Joseph Porteus sailed from Liverpool on 23 July 1804. Porteus started acquiring captives at Accra on 4 September. Ann arrived at Kingston on 31 December with 233 captives. She sailed from Kingston on 25 March 1805 and arrived at Liverpool on 10 June. She had left Liverpool with 32 crew members and had suffered no crew deaths on her voyage. She brought with her as cargo rum, coffee, logwood, and fustic.

8th voyage transporting enslaved people (1805–1806): Captain Porteus sailed from Liverpool on 27 July 1805, and arrived at Kingston on 18 February 1806 with 230 captives. She sailed from Kingston on 28 March. Lloyd's List reported in July that Ann, Porteus, master, had put into Norfolk, Virginia, leaky. Ann arrived at Liverpool on 1 November. She had left Liverpool with 26 crew members and had suffered one crew death on her voyage.

9th voyage transporting enslaved people (1807–1808): Captain Porteus sailed from Liverpool on 2 March 1807. However, on 10 March the French privateer Rivermont captured Ann at 37°N 17°W. Rivermont was armed with six 12-pounder guns and twelve 42-pounder carronades, and had a crew of 175 men. The Frenchmen plundered Ann of all her small stores, part of her cables, sails, and cargo. They also threw all her guns overboard. They then released Ann to her crew. She arrived back at Liverpool on 5 April.

Porteus and Ann resumed her original voyage. He acquired captives at Accra and Ann arrived at Kingston on 27 January 1808 with 244 captives. She sailed from Kingston on 26 April and arrived at Liverpool on 4 July. She had left Liverpool with 37 crew members and had suffered three crew deaths on her voyage.

The Slave Trade Act 1807 ended British participation in the trans-Atlantic slave trade. Thereafter Ann returned to merchant trade.

Year	Master	Owner	Trade	Source & notes
1808	Porteus; Woodhall	Litt & Co.	Liverpool–Africa	LR; large repair 1802, new deck, new wales, and thorough repairs 1807.
1810	Woodhall	Stitt & Co.	London–Rio de Janeiro	LR; new top sides and thorough repair 1809

In 1809, Ann, Woodall, master, sailed to the West Indies and back. She then sailed to Rio de Janeiro. Ann, Woodall, master, had sailed from Rio de Janeiro on 18 February and spent five weeks in the channel. She had come into Liverpool on 19 May and was reported to have sunk on 24 May in the Old Dock at Liverpool. On 19 May 1810 Ann was back at Liverpool from Rio de Janeiro. She had nine feet of water in her hold. Her anchor had gone through her bow as she was going into dock.

On 2 September 1810, Ann, Woodall, master, arrived at Jamaica from Whitehaven. On 11 December she had arrived at Gravesend, Kent.
