= French corvette Moineau =

History

France
- Name: Moineau
- Namesake: Sparrow
- In service: May 1794 (French Navy)
- Out of service: 1797 (left naval service)
- Fate: Returned to owner

General characteristics
- Propulsion: Sail
- Complement: 172, or 190
- Armament: 16 or 26 guns (Note: One British account give her armament as 26 × 9-pounder guns. This information comes from a journal by James Wilson, who describes himself as the commander of Lady Shore. The French navy used 8-pounder long guns, not 9-pounders, but the discrepancy may represent nothing more than an approximate equivalence, the French pound being heavier than the British pound. The discrepancy in the number of guns, with an American source supporting the figure of 26, may have resulted from Moineau being pierced for 26 but only carrying 16, or from a latter expansion of her armament. Another source gives her armament as twenty-six 8 and 4-pounders.)

Moineau was the former merchantman Spartiate, which the French Navy requisitioned to serve as 16-gun corvette on the Île de France station between 1794 and 1797.

== Career ==
In May 1794, the French Navy brought Spartiate into naval service as Moineau. She then served in the naval station of Île de France, carrying out missions to Batavia.

In June 1796, the French Directory's executive agents Baco and Burnel, arrived at Mauritius with the naval division under Sercey and set out to abolish slavery, in application of the decree of 16 Pluviose Year II on the abolition of slavery. This alienated the colonists and Governor Malartic; a militia stormed Baco and Burnel's quarters and forcibly put them aboard Moineau.

Malartic then ordered Commander (and capitaine de frégate) Tayeau, the captain of Moineau, to carry Baco and Burnel to Batavia. (Note: Lecomte states that Moineau was to maroon them on the shores of Madagascar. Other accounts have Malartic giving Tayeau sealed orders to take them to the Philippines and land them at Manila or on the coast of one of its islands.)

Once Moineau was at sea, Baco and Burnel ordered Tayeau to bring them to France. Moineau then sailed for Rochefort. Upon Moineau's arrival, Tayeau was commended for his action.

On the way back to France, Moineau first stopped at Foulepointe, a French factory on the coast of Madagascar to reprovision. Next, near the Cape of Good Hope, Moineau encountered Lady Shore, which was sailing to Bengal on behalf of the British East India Company. (Note: Lady Shore was an "extra ship", not an East Indiaman. That is, she was on a short-term contract to the EIC, not a long-term contract.) Moineau captured Lady Shore on 19 July. After stripping her of much of her cargo, Tayeau let her go on 22 July, permitting her captain to take her into the Cape.

== Fate ==
Moineau was returned to her original owner in 1797.
