= HMS Cruelle (1800) =

Cutter of the Royal Navy

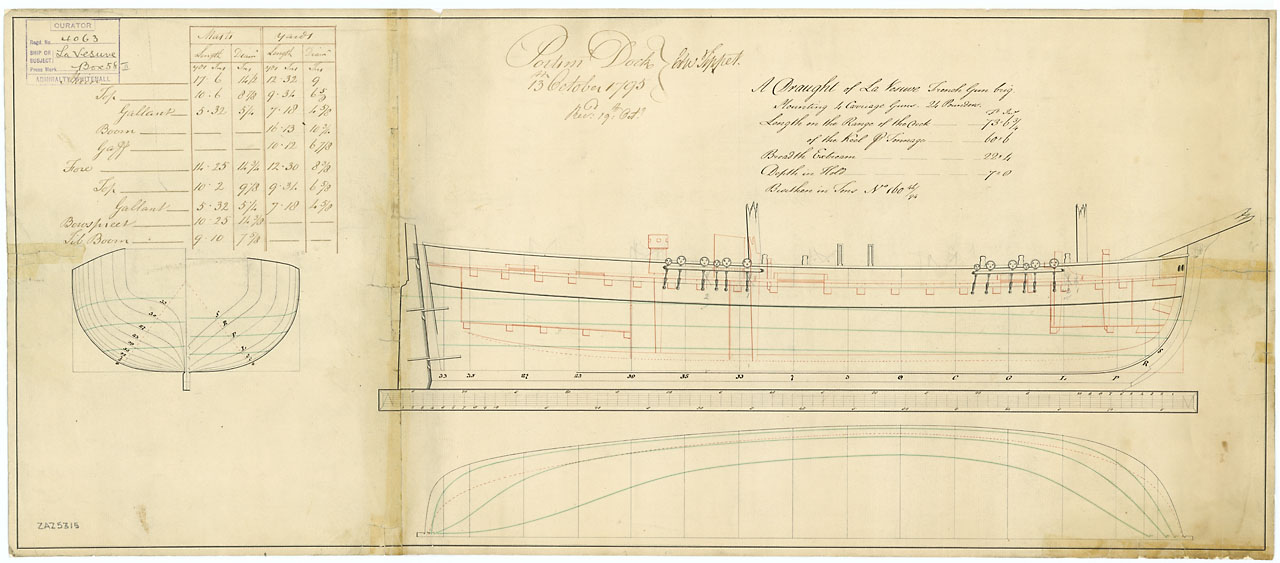
- Plans of Vésuve, lead ship of the class, as surveyed by the British after her capture

History

France
- Name: Cruelle
- Builder: probably Lemarchand, Saint-Malo
- Laid down: ca. March 1793
- Launched: July 1793
- Captured: 1 June 1800

Great Britain
- Name: HMS Cruelle
- Acquired: 1 June 1800 by capture
- Honours and awards: Naval General Service Medal with clasp "Egypt".
- Fate: Sold 1801

General characteristics
- Class & type: Vésuve-class gunbrig
- Displacement: 140 tons (French)
- Tons burthen: 158 (bm)
- Length: 22.74 m (74 ft 7 in) (overall); 19.49 m (63 ft 11 in) (keel)
- Beam: 6.50 m (21 ft 4 in)
- Propulsion: Sails
- Sail plan: Schooner
- Complement: 53 (French service)
- Armament: French service: 4 × 24-pounder guns + 2 × swivel guns; British service: 8 or 10 × 4-pounder guns

Cruelle was a schooner-cannoniere (gun-schooner), launched in 1793. The British captured her in June 1800 and commissioned her as HMS Cruelle. She spent a little over a year in the Mediterranean, serving at Malta and Alexandria before the Royal Navy sold her in 1801.

== French service and capture ==
Cruelle was one of seven Vésuve-class brick-canonniers, though she herself was described as being schooner-rigged. However, her captors described her as a brig.

In late 1794 she sailed from Brest to Guadeloupe to alert the French there that a naval squadron under the command of Capitaine de Vaisseau Duchesne was on its way with supplies and reinforcements. At some point thereafter, Cruelle was converted to a bomb vessel.

On 1 June 1800 about 12 leagues (58 km) southward of Les Hières Mermaid captured Cruelle when Cruelle was only eight hours out of Toulon. Captain R. Dudley Oliver of Mermaid described Cruelle as a brig of six guns, four of which she had thrown overboard during the chase. She had a crew of 43 men under the command of Ensigne de vaisseau Francis Xavier Jeard. She was a bomb vessel but had left her mortar at Toulon as she was carrying supplies for Malta.

The British took Cruelle into service under her existing name. All subsequent British accounts refer to Cruelle as a cutter of ten guns.

== British service ==
Cruelle was present at the surrender of the island of Malta on 5 September 1800. As a result, she was entitled to share in the prize money for the island.

Cruelle was registered on 3 October 1800 and commissioned in February 1801 under Lieutenant Charles Inglis for the Mediterranean.

On 8 March she was at Abu Qir Bay under the command of Lieutenant David M'Gie (or McGhie), Cruelle protected the left flank during the landing of troops in Aboukir Bay, together with the cutter Janissary and the gun-vessel Dangereuse. The cutter Entreprenante, schooner Malta, and the gun-vessel Negresse covered the right flank.

Also in March Lieutenant Edward (or Edmond or Edmund) Boger was appointed to command her. On 9 May Cruelle, Kent, and Hector unsuccessfully chased the French corvette Heliopolis, which eluded them and slipped into Alexandria.

In 1850 the Admiralty authorized the award of the Naval General Service medal with clasp "Egypt" to all naval officers and men who had served there between 8 March and 2 September. In the medal listing Boger is listed as Cruelle's captain. Apparently he personally also received the Turkish gold medal for the gallantry he displayed there. (Note: A first-class share of the prize money awarded in April 1823 was worth £34 2s 4d; a fifth-class share, that of a seaman, was worth 3s 11½d. The amount was small as the total had to be shared between 79 vessels and the entire army contingent.)

== Fate ==
Cruelle was sold in 1801 at Alexandria. She was deleted from the lists on 13 May 1802.
