= HMS Minotaur (1793) =

British ship of the line (1793–1810)

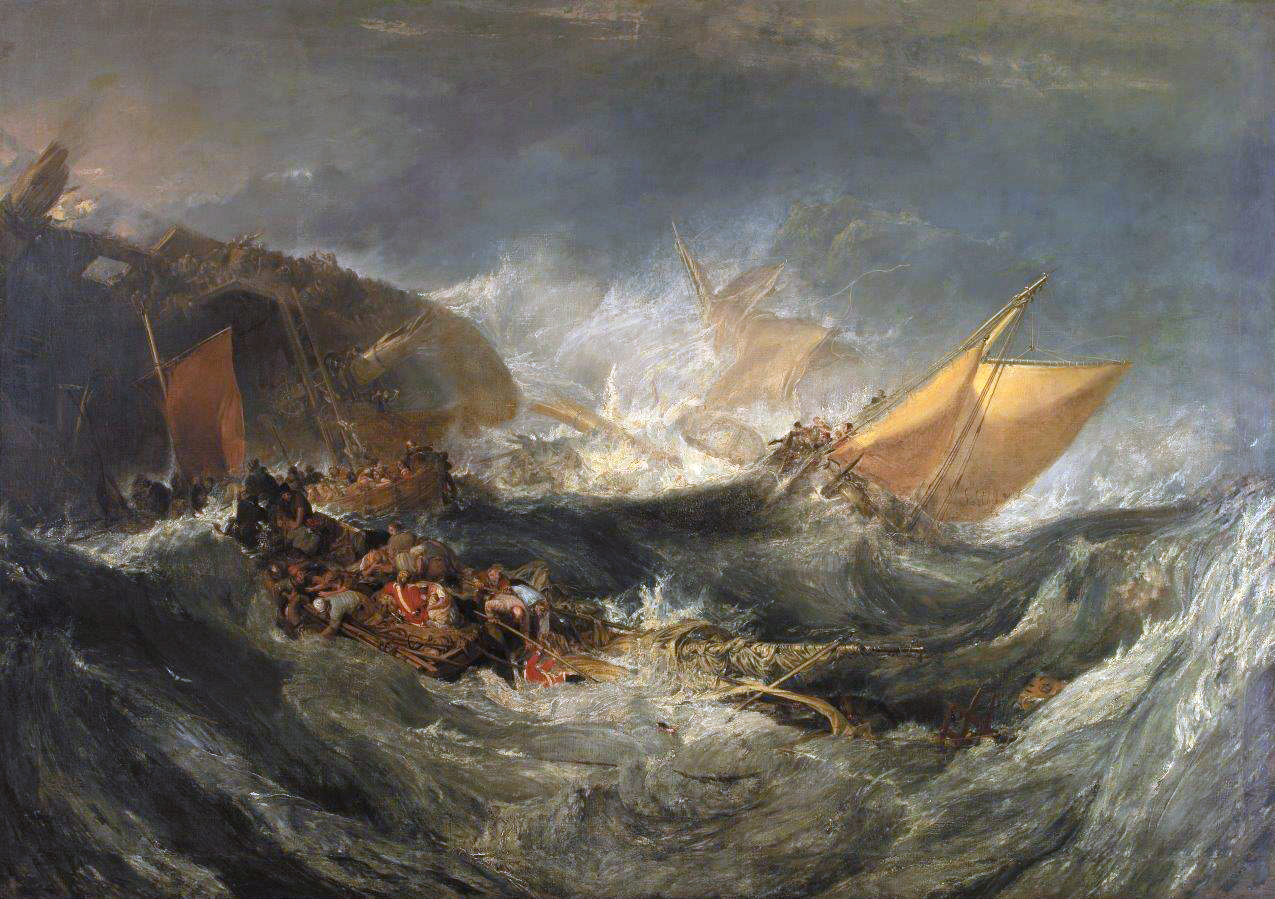
- The Wreck of a Transport Ship (1810), often compared to Minotaur's sinking

History

Great Britain
- Name: HMS Minotaur
- Ordered: 3 December 1782
- Builder: William Rule, Woolwich Dockyard
- Laid down: January 1788
- Launched: 6 November 1793
- Honours and awards: Participated in: Battle of the Nile; Battle of Trafalgar; Battle of Copenhagen (1807); Naval General Service Medal with clasp "Egypt"
- Fate: Wrecked, 22 December 1810

General characteristics
- Class & type: Courageux-class ship of the line
- Tons burthen: 1,723 (bm)
- Length: 172 ft 3 in (52.50 m) (gundeck)
- Beam: 47 ft 9 in (14.55 m)
- Depth of hold: 20 ft 9 1/2 in (6.3 m)
- Propulsion: Sails
- Sail plan: Full-rigged ship
- Armament: Gun deck: 28 × 32-pounder guns; Upper gun deck: 28 × 18-pounder guns; QD: 14 × 9-pounder guns; Fc: 4 × 9-pounder guns

HMS Minotaur was a 74-gun third-rate ship of the line of the Royal Navy launched on 6 November 1793 at Woolwich. She was named after the mythological bull-headed monster of Crete. She fought in three major battles – Nile, Trafalgar, and Copenhagen (1807) – before she was wrecked, with heavy loss of life, in December 1810.

== Career ==
On 26 September 1795 Minotaur and Porcupine recaptured Walsingham Packet. The French corvette brig Insolent, of 18 guns and 90 men, had captured Walsingham Packet, which was sailing from Falmouth to Lisbon, on 13 September. Insolent narrowly escaped being herself captured at the recapture of Walsingham Packet, getting into Lorient as the British ships came into range.

Minotaur fought at the battle of the Nile in 1798, engaging the Aquilon with HMS Theseus and forcing her surrender. In the battle Minotaur lost 23 men dead and 64 wounded.

After the French surrendered Rome on 29 September 1799, Captain Thomas Louis had his barge crew row him up the Tiber River where he raised the Union Jack over the Capitol.

In February 1800 Minotaur's crew reportedly impressed 12 sailors from the American merchantman Providence at Livorno.

In May 1800, Minotaur served as the flagship of Vice-Admiral Lord Keith at the siege of Genoa. The naval squadron consisted of Minotaur, Phoenix, Mondovi, Entreprenante, and the tender Victoire.

On 28 April, the squadron captured the Proteus, off Genoa. (Note: An initial payment of prize money was paid in 1805. However, a later payment arrived in May 1812. This amounted to £451 7s, which was supposed to be shared among possibly 2900 claimants. Because the amount was so small relative to the number of men who would share it, the ships' agents invested the amount in tickets in the state lottery. Apparently, the tickets won £30. This obviously did not actually solve the problem.)

On 8 January 1801 Penelope captured the French bombard St. Roche, which was carrying wine, liqueurs, ironware, Delfth cloth, and various other merchandise, from Marseilles to Alexandria. Swiftsure, Tigre, Minotaur, Northumberland, Florentina, and the schooner Malta, were in sight and shared in the proceeds of the capture.

She was present at the landings in Aboukir Bay during the invasion of Egypt in 1801 where she lost a total of three men killed, and six wounded. Because Minotaur served in the navy's Egyptian campaign (8 March to 8 September 1801), her officers and crew qualified for the clasp "Egypt" to the Naval General Service Medal that the Admiralty authorised in 1850 to all surviving claimants. (Note: A first-class share of the prize money awarded in April 1823 was worth £34 2s 4d; a fifth-class share, that of a seaman, was worth 3s 11 1/2d. The amount was small as the total had to be shared between 79 vessels and the entire army contingent.)

On 28 May 1803 Minotaur, in company with Thunderer, and later joined by Albion, captured the French frigate Franchise. Franchise was 33 days out of Port-au-Prince, and was pierced for twenty-eight 12-pounder guns on her main deck and sixteen 9-pounders on her quarterdeck and forecastle, ten of which were in her hold. She had a crew of 187 men under the command of Captain Jurien. (Note: The original notice in the London Gazette gave the frigate's name as Françoise. The next edition corrected the name to Franchise.)

Minotaur was present at the surrender of the French garrison at Civitavecchia on 21 September 1804. She shared the prize money for the capture of the town and fortress with Culloden, Mutine, Transfer, and the bomb vessel Perseus. The British also captured the French polacca Il Reconniscento.

Minotaur, under Captain Charles John Moore Mansfield, participated in the Battle of Trafalgar. There she was instrumental in capturing the Spanish ship Neptuno, although Neptuno's crew recaptured her in the storm that followed the battle.

Minotaur was towards the rear of Nelson's wing of his fleet at Trafalgar. Mansfield pledged to his assembled crew that he would stick to any ship he engaged "till either she strikes or sinks – or I sink". Late in the battle he deliberately placed Minotaur between the damaged Victory and an attacking French ship; he was later awarded a sword and gold medal for his gallantry. Both are now in the National Maritime Museum.

In 1807 Minotaur served as the flagship of Rear-Admiral William Essington at the Battle of Copenhagen.

Then on 25 July, during the Anglo-Russian War, 17 boats from a British squadron under the command of Captain Charles Pater, consisting of Minotaur, Princess Caroline, Cerberus and Prometheus, attacked a flotilla of four Russian gunboats and a brig off Aspö Head near Fredrickshamn in the Grand Duchy of Finland, Russia (present-day Hamina, Finland). Captain Forrest of Prometheus commanded the boats and succeeded in capturing gunboats Nos. 62, 65, and 66, and the transport brig No. 11. The action was sanguinary in that the British lost 19 men killed and 51 wounded, and the Russians lost 28 men killed and 59 wounded. Minotaur alone lost eight men killed and had 30 wounded, of whom four died of their wounds on the next day or so. In 1847 the Admiralty issued the Naval General Service Medal with clasp "25 July Boat Service 1809" to surviving claimants from the action. Cerberus then moved to the Mediterranean in 1810.

== Shipwreck ==
Whilst sailing from Gothenburg to Britain, under the command of John Barrett, Minotaur in darkness and heavy weather struck the Haak Bank, or Razende Bol, on the Texel off the Netherlands, then part of the First French Empire, in the evening of 22 December 1810, after becoming separated from her consorts, HMS Plantagenet and Loire. Minotaur got stuck in the sand, rolled on her side and quickly made water. It was decided to cut all the masts to lighten the ship; this destroyed some of the boats. By the early morning, the ship had nevertheless sunk deeper, flooding the forecastle. Waves pounded the hull. Around 08:00, the hull split asunder. The crew, taking refuge on the poop deck, tried to evacuate on a remaining launch and two yauls. Thirty-two men escaped on a yaul. When they reached the Dutch coast, this inspired another eighty-five to use the launch; they too reached the shore. Captain Barrett, together with about a hundred men, then tried to escape with the remaining yaul but it was swamped and all drowned. Around 14:00, the Minotaur turned completely, drowning the remaining crew. The 110 of her crew that had taken to her boats informed the Dutch authorities of the disaster. Another twenty survivors were rescued by a pilot vessel. The authorities placed the survivors under custody and refused to dispatch more rescue vessels until the following morning. The rescue party found however that apart from four men who had reached shore by clinging to wreckage, no survivors remained on the vessel or in the surrounding water. The death toll therefore was between 370 and 570 men. All survivors were taken to France as prisoners of war.

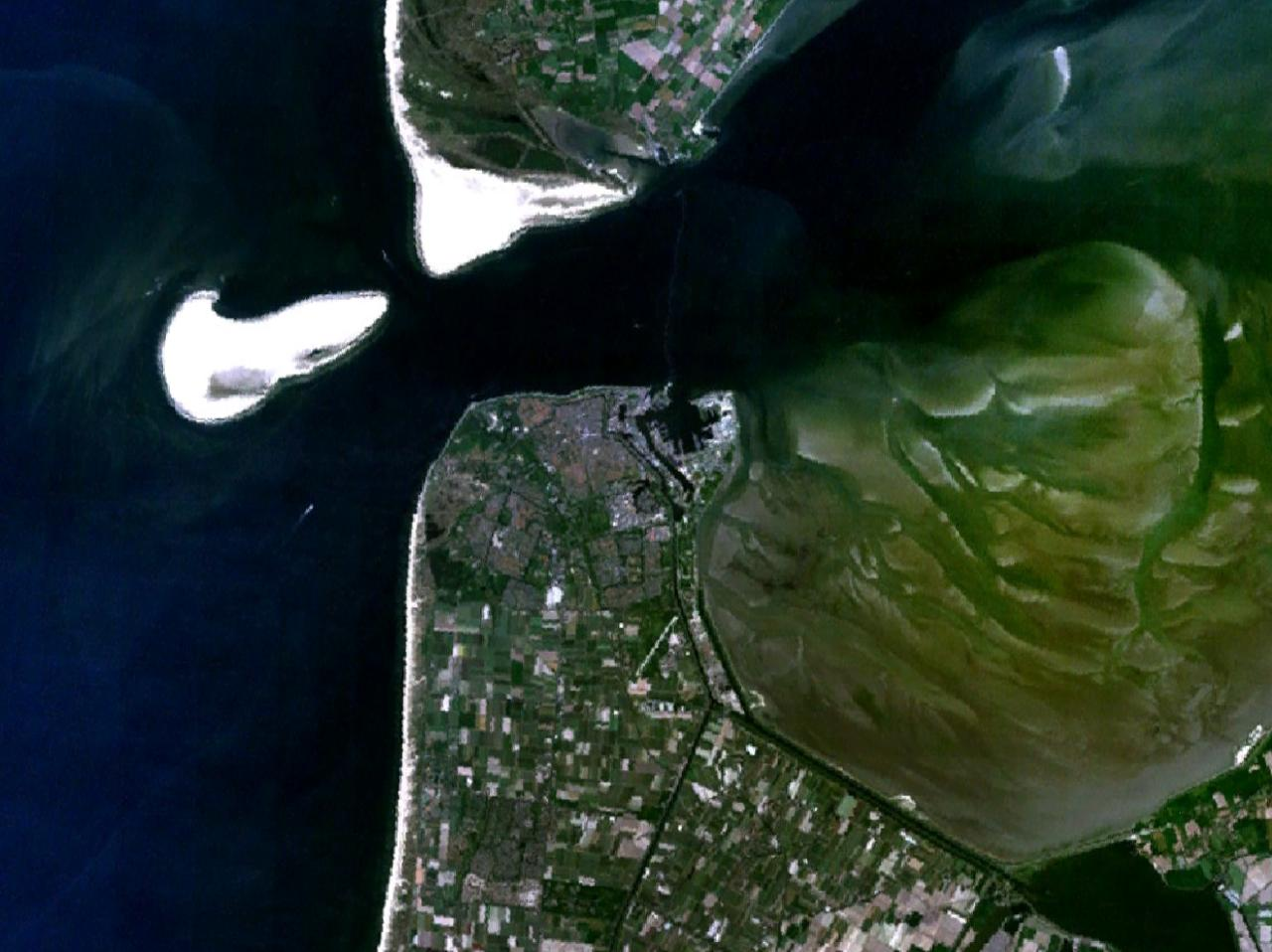
The Noorderhaaks bank, in the mouth of the Texel, is today an island

Three and a half years later, when the prisoners were released, the customary court martial decided that the deceased pilots were to blame for steering the ship into an unsafe position, having misjudged their location by over 60 miles because of the weather. Some of the survivors, including Lieutenant Snell, criticized the Dutch authorities for their failure to despatch rescue boats sooner. Snell stated "The launch which had brought on shore eighty-five men, was of the smallest description of 74 launches, with one gunwale entirely broken in, and without a rudder. This will better prove than anything I can say how easy it would have been for the Dutch admiral in the Texel to have saved, or to have shown some wish to have saved, the remaining part of the crew". Reports from the Dutch chief officer of the marine district of the North coast indicated that the Dutch had sent two boats out to examine the wreck site on the morning of 23 December, but the wind and the seas prevented them from approaching. Maritime historian William Stephen Gilly concluded in 1850 that "There is not the slightest doubt but that, had the Dutch sent assistance, the greater part of the ship's company would have been saved".

== Legacy ==
The famed landscape painter J. M. W. Turner depicted the sinking, though the subject was not originally the Minotaur, but a generic merchant ship. Turner had been producing sketches in preparation for the painting as early as 1805, but by the time he had completed the painting in 1810, the recent wreck of Minotaur was a subject of much discussion. He named the painting to capitalise on this public interest.

The shipwreck of Minotaur remains the largest ever, in terms of loss of life, on the Dutch coast, with the possible exception of the loss of HMS Hero on 24/25 December 1811, on the same location. The tragic event, and the British accusations, made the Dutch realise that, despite the notoriously dangerous shoals in their waters, they lacked specialised equipment to save the crews of wrecked ships. In response on 11 November 1824, for the area of the Texel the Koninklijke Noord-Hollandsche Redding-Maatschappij was founded, the first Dutch sea-rescue organisation.

Master's mate Stephen Hilton brought home the Union Jack from Minotaur at Trafalgar as a souvenir, along with an Austrian flag from a captured Spanish ship. His descendants presented the flags to St Mary's Church in Kent in 1930, where they hung until 2011 when the church sold them to the National Maritime Museum for a reported sum of £175,000. After conservation work the flag was put on display in October 2015 in the National Maritime Museum to mark Trafalgar Day. It has lost its right-hand edge, and an oblong section that may have been cut away as a souvenir, but was in surprisingly good condition. After cleaning and gently ironing out 200 years’ worth of creases and crumples, it gained several centimetres, and now measures an imposing 233 cm × 310 cm.
