= HMS Negresse =

UK gun-vessel 1799–1802

History

France
- Name: Négresse
- Owner: French Navy
- Acquired: March 1793 by requisition
- Captured: 18 March 1799 by the Royal Navy

Great Britain
- Name: HMS Negresse
- Owner: Royal Navy
- Acquired: 18 March 1799
- Honours and awards: Naval General Service Medal with clasp "Egypt"
- Fate: Sold 1802

General characteristics
- Class & type: Aviso
- Sail plan: Tartane
- Complement: 53
- Armament: Originally: 2 × 18-pounder + 2 × 6-pounder guns; At capture: 6 guns; British service:6 guns

HMS Negresse was a tartane that the French Navy requisitioned at Marseilles in March 1798 and used as an aviso in the Egyptian campaign. The Royal Navy captured her in 1799 and took her into service. She participated in the defense at the siege of Acre later that year and in 1801 at the landing of British troops at Aboukir Bay. The Royal Navy sold her in 1802.

== French service ==
On 17 August 1798 Negresse was one of seven avisos in port at Alexandria.

== British service ==
Negresse was one of a flotilla of seven vessels that Commodore Sir Sidney Smith in HMS Tigre took at Acre on 18 March 1799, all of which the British took into service. At capture Negresse carried six guns and had a crew of 53 men. The Navy appointed Lieutenant Richard to command her.

The flotilla of gun-vessels was carrying siege artillery and other siege supplies to reinforce Napoleon's troops besieging Acre. Smith immediately put the guns and supplies to use to help the denizens of the city resist the French, and the gun-vessels to harass them.

Smith anchored Tigre and HMS Theseus, one on each side of the town, so their broadsides could assist the defence. The gun-vessels were of shallower draft and so could come in closer. Together, they helped repel repeated French assaults. The French attacked multiple times between 19 March and 10 May before Napoleon finally gave up. On 21 May he destroyed his siege train and retreated back to Egypt, having lost 2,200 men dead, 1,000 of them to the plague.

After Napoleon's failure at Acre, Negresse sailed to Jaffa. There her seamen rescued seven French soldiers in hospital for the plague from massacre by the Turks. The invalids came abroad Negresse; on her they received medical care and four survived.

Next, Negresse served in the Egyptian campaign of 1801 where, together with the schooner Malta and the cutter Entreprenante, she protected the left flank during the landing of troops in Aboukir Bay. (Note: A first-class share of the prize money awarded in April 1823 was worth £34 2s 4d; a fifth-class share, that of a seaman, was worth 3s 11½d. The amount was small as the total had to be shared between 79 vessels and the entire army contingent.)

== Fate ==
Negresse was sold in 1802. In 1850 the Admiralty awarded the Naval General Service Medal with clasp "Egypt" to claimants from the crews of the vessels that had served in the navy's Egyptian campaign between 8 March 1801 and 2 September, including Negresse.
