= HMS Dangereuse =

18th century naval vessel

History

France
- Name: Duguay-Trouin
- Owner: French Navy
- Acquired: May 1794 by requisition
- Renamed: Dangereuse
- Captured: 18 March 1799 by the Royal Navy

Great Britain
- Name: HMS Dangereuse
- Owner: Royal Navy
- Acquired: 18 March 1799
- Honors and awards: Naval General service Medal with clasp "Egypt"
- Fate: Sold 1801

General characteristics
- Class & type: Aviso
- Sail plan: Tartane
- Complement: 23
- Armament: Originally: 2 × 8-pounder + 2 × 4-pounder guns; At capture: 6 guns

HMS Dangereuse was a tartane named Duguay-Trouin that the French Navy requisioned in May 1794 to serve as an aviso. The Navy renamed her Dangereuse either in May 1795 or on 2 March 1796. She was one of a flotilla of seven gun-vessels that Commodore Sir Sidney Smith in HMS Tigre took at Acre on 18 March 1799, all of which the British took into service. At capture Dangereuse carried six guns and had a crew of 23 men. Smith put her under the command of Lieutenant Robert William Tyte (acting).

The gun-vessels were carrying siege artillery and other siege supplies to reinforce Napoleon's troops besieging Acre. Smith immediately put the guns and supplies to use to help the denizens of the city resist the French, and the gun-vessels to harass them.

Smith anchored Tigre and Theseus, one on each side of the town, so their broadsides could assist the defence. The gun-vessels were of shallower draft and so could come in closer. Together, they helped repel repeated French assaults. The French attacked some 40 times between 19 March and 10 May before Napoleon finally gave up. On 21 May he destroyed his siege train and retreated back to Egypt, having lost 2,200 men dead, 1,000 to the plague.

After Napoleon's failure at Acre, Smith sailed with his squadron on 12 June. He proceeded first to Beruta road, and then to Larnica road, Cyprus, in order to refit his little squadron. He and Tigre then departed for Constantinople; the gun-vessels remained in the theatre.

Dangereuse next served in the Egyptian campaign of 1801 where, together with the gunboat Janissary and the cutter Cruelle, she protected the right flank during the landing of troops in Aboukir Bay. (Note: A first-class share of the prize money awarded in April 1823 was worth £34 2s 4d; a fifth-class share, that of a seaman, was worth 3s 11½d. The amount was small as the total had to be shared between 79 vessels and the entire army contingent.)

Dangereuse was sold later that same year. In 1850 the Admiralty awarded the Naval General Service Medal with clasp "Egypt" to claimants from the crews of the vessels that had served in the navy's Egyptian campaign between 8 March 1801 and 2 September, including Dangereuse.

== See also ==
- Siege of Acre (1799)
- List of gun-vessels Commodore Sir Sidney Smith captured at Acre in March 1799
