= Columbus (1793 ship) =

History

Great Britain
- Name: Columbus
- Namesake: Christopher Columbus
- Builder: Beaulieu, or Southampton
- Launched: 1793
- Fate: Condemned 1807

General characteristics
- Tons burthen: 338, or 341, or 359, or 363 (bm)
- Complement: 1799: 45; 1600: 40; 1803: 40; 1805: 45; 1806: 50
- Armament: 1799: 18 × 9-pounder guns; 1600: 20 × 16&9-pounder guns; 1803: 18 × 6&9&12-pounder guns; 1805: 18 × 6&9&18-pounder cannons; 1806: 20 × 18&12&9&6-pounder cannons

Columbus was launched at Southampton in 1793. At first she was a West Indiaman. Then from 1799 on she made six complete voyages as a slave ship, and was condemned at Barbados in 1807 after she had delivered her slaves on her seventh voyage.

== Career ==
Columbus first appeared in Lloyd's Register (LR) in 1794.

Year	Master	Owner	Trade	Source
1794	J.Aldis	Timperon	London–Jamaica	LR
1797	J.Aldis; Willoughby	Timperon	London–Jamaica	LR

1st slave voyage (1797–1799): Captain Thomas Willoughby sailed from London on 6 November 1797, bound for West Africa. However, while Columbus was at Deal, Captain James Aldis replaced Willoughby. Columbus acquired her slaves at Cape Coast Castle. She sailed to Demerara and then back to Kingston Jamaica. She arrived at Kingston on 25 July 1798 with 441 slaves. She sailed from Kingston on 30 October an arrived back at London on 29 January 1799.

Year	Master	Owner	Trade	Source
1799	Willoughby; James Hird	Timperon	London–Jamaica; London–Africa	LR

2nd slave voyage (1799–1800): Captain James Hird acquired a letter of marque on 24 July 1799. Columbus sailed from London on 1 August and gathered slaves at Bonny. She arrived at Kingston, Jamaica on 21 March 1800 with 472 slaves.

3rd slave voyage (1800–1801): Captain James Frodsham acquired a letter of marque on 13 October 1800. He sailed for West Africa on 7 November. Columbus arrived at Kingston on 21 April 1801 with 326 slaves. She arrived in London on 10 September.

Year	Master	Owner	Trade	Source
1801	Frodsham; J.Cromartie	Timperon	London–Africa	LR

4th slave voyage (1801–1802): Captain Cromartie sailed from London on 29 November 1801, bound for Africa. On 17 December Columbus was "all well" and in company with another Timperon-owned ship, Ann, Riddle, master, at 7°30′N 16°10′W as they were on their way to Africa. Columbus acquired slaves at Bonny. At some point Captain James Forbes replaced Cromartie as Columbus, Forbes, master, arrived at Kingston on 12 July 1802 with 336 slaves. She sailed for London 6 September and arrived back there on 8 December.

5th slave voyage (1803–1804): Captain James Rimmes acquired a letter of marque on 2 June 1803. Captain Rimmer sailed from London on 19 June 1803. Columbus reached Barbados from Africa and sailed on to Kingston, Jamaica. She arrived there on 13 November with 337 slaves. She sailed for England 21 March 1804.

Year	Master	Owner	Trade	Source
1804	Rimmer; Lee	Timperon	London–Africa	LR

On 1 September 1804 Columbus, Lee, master, sailed from Cork for Jamaica. She arrived at Barbados from Liverpool about 1 November and in Jamaica on 12 November.

Year	Master	Owner	Trade	Source
1805	Lee; P.Callan	Hart & Co.	Cork–Africa	LR

6th slave voyage (1805–1806): Captain Patrick Callan acquired a letter of marque on 22 August 1805. He sailed for West Africa on 10 September. Columbus acquired her slaves at Cape Grand Mount and arrived at Kingston on 25 February 1806 with 309 slaves. She left Kingston on 1 April and arrived at Liverpool on 26 June. She had left Great Britain with 49 crew members and suffered five crew deaths on her voyage.

Year	Master	Owner	Trade	Source
1805	P.Callan; A.Elliott	Litt & Co.	Liverpool–Africa	LR

7th slave voyage (1806–1807): Captain Adam Elliott acquired a letter of marque on 5 August 1806. He sailed from Liverpool on 25 September, bound for Africa. Columbus arrived in Barbados on 27 August 1807. She had left Liverpool with 58 crew members and she suffered 20 crew deaths on her voyage.

== Fate ==
Columbus was condemned at Barbados after she had delivered her slaves.
