= Walsingham (1795 ship) =

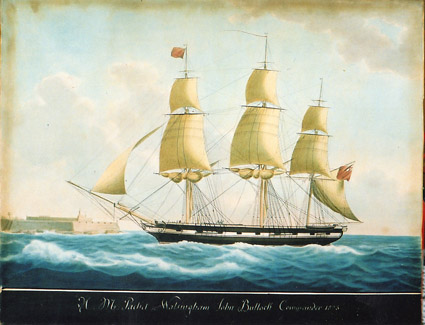
- HM Packet Walsingham, John Bullock Commander, by Nicolas Cammillieri (Malta)

History

Great Britain
- Name: Walsingham
- Operator: Postal Service (1795-1826)
- Builder: Hill & Mellish, Limehouse
- Launched: 1795
- Fate: Wrecked 1828

General characteristics
- Tons burthen: 17448/94, or 180, or 185 (bm)
- Length: 82 ft 0 in (25.0 m)
- Beam: 23 ft 4 in (7.1 m)
- Complement: 1815:15
- Armament: 1813:8 × 6-pounder guns; 1815:2 × 9-pounder guns

Walsingham (or Walsingham Packet), launched in 1795, was a Falmouth packet. Shortly after her launch a French privateer captured her but the British Royal Navy quickly recaptured her. Her recapture gave rise to a court case. In 1815 she successfully repelled an American privateer in a notable single-ship action. She continued to serve the Post Office until 1826 when she was sold. She was wrecked in 1828.

== Career ==
Hill & Melish built Walsingham for the Post Office Packet Service. However, the vessel's masters owned and managed her. During her career she sailed where the Post Office sent her, including Portugal, Brazil, North America, Jamaica, Malta, and elsewhere.

On 26 September 1795 Porcupine and Minotaur recaptured Walsingham Packet. The French corvette brig Insolent, of 18 guns and 90 men, had captured Walsingham Packet on 13 September as Walsingham Packet, Bell, master, was sailing from Falmouth to Lisbon. Insolent narrowly escaped being herself captured at the recapture of Walsingham Packet, getting into Lorient as the British ships came into range. (Note: Insolente may have been a vessel from Bordeaux "often described as a brig, but listed as a corvette". She had a crew of 120 men and was armed with fourteen to eighteen 6-pounder guns. The British later captured her at Port-Navalo.)

Walsingham Packet had a cargo on board at the time of her capture. The British and Portuguese owners of the cargo claimed it. However, her captors disputed their claim to the cargo, pointing out that it was illegal for packets to engage in commercial trade. Justice Sir William Scott (Baron Stowell), of the High Court of Admiralty, rejected the cargo owners' claim, but left open the question of to whom the cargo would be condemned.

Lloyd's List reported on 27 November 1807 that Walsingham Packet had arrived at Falmouth with the mails for Lisbon. She had left Lisbon on the 4th after shore batteries on the Tagus River. On 22 October the government in Portugal had published a proclamation closing all Portugal's ports to British vessels, whether naval or commercial. The proclamation was in response to Napoleon's demands as he implemented the Continental System. Mr. Chamberlain, the Post Office's agent at Lisbon, dispatched the proclamation on the 27th. Anticipating the expulsion or even arrest of all British residents from Portugal, he hired a small armed schooner to stand off the coast, awaiting his arrival. On 11 November the Portuguese government decided to arrest all British subjects, except the ambassador and his staff. Chamberlain made his way to the coast on foot, only to discover that the schooner had departed. He tried to reach some of the British vessels that were off the coast, but the surf prevented him from reaching them. He was able to reach Walsingham, which the shore batteries had fired on the day before, and which was standing off the coast trying to ascertain what was happening. With Chamberlain's arrival and his report, Walsingham had its answer and she departed for Falmouth.

In July 1808, the Post office withdrew Walsingham from the Lisbon run and moved her to serve the Brazils. The Portuguese government in exile had just moved to Rio de Janeiro.

In 1813 Lloyd's Register started to list the Falmouth packets. It showed Walsingham with Roberts, owner, changing to Bullock. Her owner was Captain and Co.

On 11 February 1815, Walsingham was 100 miles to windward was on her way to Jamaica, and under the temporary command of Captain William Nichols. She sighted a schooner that outsailed Walsingham and bore up and hoisted a British blue ensign. Nichols was not deceived and prepared his guns, moving two 9-pounders to the stern to act as stern chasers. As the schooner came up it was clear that she was American, armed with twelve long 9-pounder guns, and that her forecastle was packed with men in preparation for boarding Walsingham. The two vessels exchanged broadsides for half an hour. The American's masts and rigging were badly damaged and the British considered attempting to capture their assailant, but she was able none the less to sail off. Walsingham had five men wounded. When she arrived at Jamaica the local merchants raised some £500 to award Nichols with an honour sword and to reward his crew.

At the end of the Napoleonic Wars the packets were put on a peacetime establishment with respect to their armament and manning. She held the record as the fastest ship to Rio de Janeiro. She made the round trip in 82 days in August–November 1817. She remained in service until the Royal Navy took over delivery of the mail.

Walsingham last appeared in Lloyd's Register's list of Falmouth packets in 1825 with J. Bullock as master and owner.

In 1826 Walsingham was sold to Neill & Co. The 1826 volume of Lloyd's Register showed her master changing from Bullock to Bourke, her owner from Capt. & Co. to Neal, and her trade from Falmouth to London–Cape of Good Hope.

== Fate ==
On 15 June 1828 Walsingham was driven ashore and wrecked at the Cape of Good Hope.

== Post script ==
There is a project under way to secure funding for the construction at Falmouth of a replica of Walsingham. The first phase of the project is to restore a small fishing punt of approximately 100 years of age which will be used as a pinnace and a talking point for educational purposes until Walsingham can be built.
