= HMS Malta (1800 schooner) =

History

Spain
- Name: Malta
- Launched: 1797 in the United States of America
- Acquired: Unknown
- Captured: by the Royal Navy in 1800

Great Britain
- Name: HMS Malta
- Acquired: By capture 1800
- Renamed: HMS Gozo in December 1800
- Honours and awards: Naval General Service Medal (NGSM) with clasp "Egypt"
- Fate: Sold 1804

General characteristics
- Type: 10-gun schooner
- Tons burthen: 162 9/94 (bm)
- Length: 80 ft 5 in (24.5 m) (overall); 64 ft 11 in (19.8 m) (keel)
- Beam: 21 ft 8 in (6.6 m)
- Depth of hold: 12 ft 0 in (3.7 m)
- Complement: 50 in British service
- Armament: 10 × 4-pounder guns

HMS Malta was the Spanish 10-gun schooner Malta, built and launched in the United States of America in 1797. The British captured her in 1800. After the Royal Navy captured the French ship-of-the-line Guillaume Tell and renamed her HMS Malta, the Admiralty renamed the schooner Gozo in December 1800 after the Maltese island of Gozo. (Note: Winfield awards the capture to HMS Thames. Unfortunately, there is no mention in the London Gazette of the capture, or for that matter of the capture of any Spanish schooner with the name Malta.)

Malta was one of six British warships in sight on 8 January 1801 when HMS Penelope captured the French bombard St. Roche. She was carrying wine, liqueurs, ironware, Delft (sic) cloth, and various other merchandise from Marseilles to Alexandria.

Then on 8 March the "Malta schooner", Entreprenante, and the gun-vessel Negresse protected the right flank during the landing of troops in Aboukir Bay. Cruelle protected the left flank, together with the cutter Janissary and the gun-vessel Dangereuse.

Because Gozo served in the fleet under Admiral Lord Keith in the Egyptian campaign between 8 March and 2 September, she is listed amongst the vessels whose crews qualified for the NGSM with clasp "Egypt". (Note: A first-class share of the prize money awarded in April 1823 was worth £34 2s 4d; a fifth-class share, that of a seaman, was worth 3s 11½d. The amount was small as the total had to be shared between 79 vessels and the entire army contingent.)

On 9 June Gozo (misspelled as Gogo) captured the chasse maree Trompeuse, which was sailing to Ancona.

Gozo was sold in 1804.
