= HMS Entreprenante =

Cutter of the Royal Navy

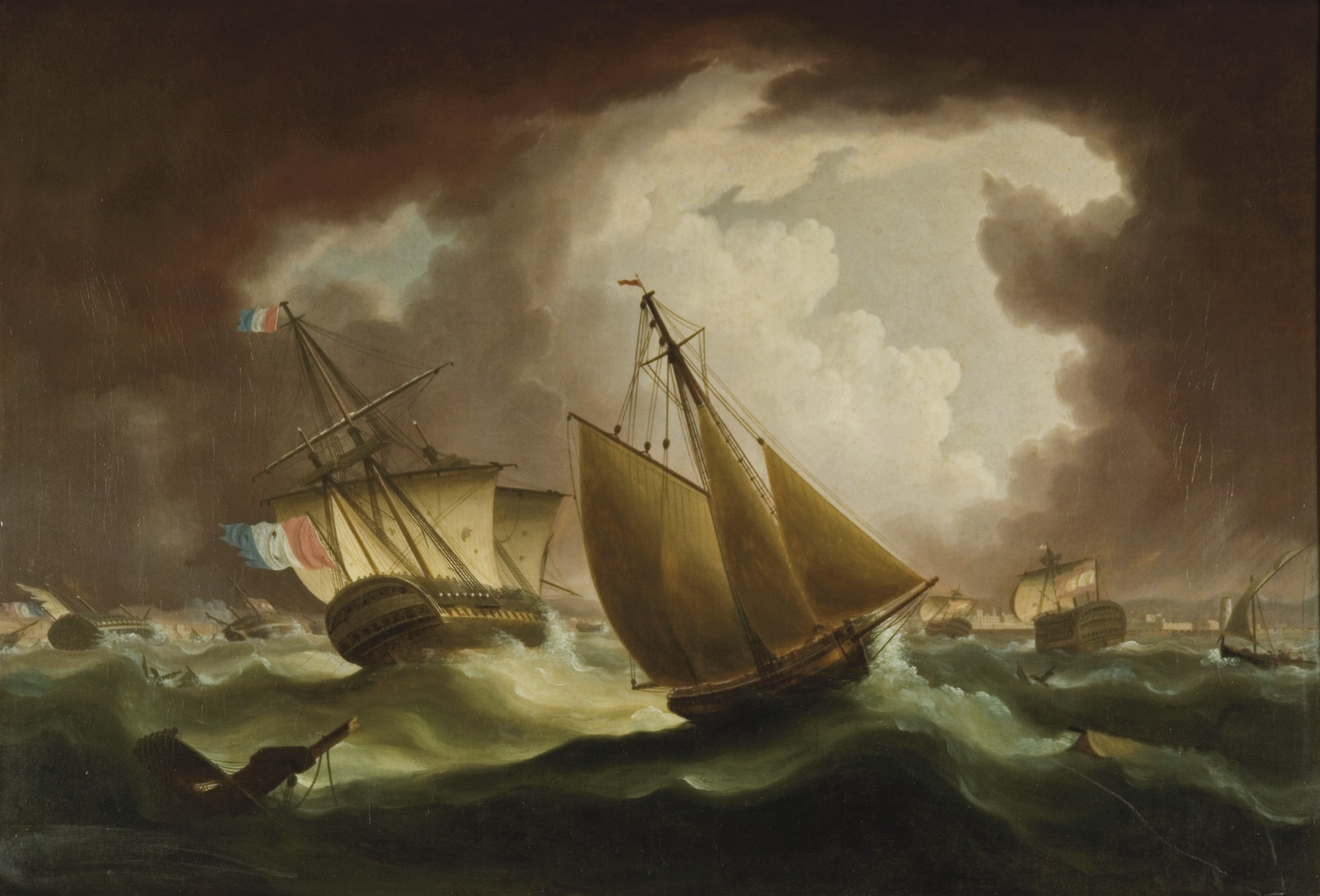
- The Royal Navy armed cutter Entreprenante shadowing the remnants of the Franco-Spanish fleet as it runs into Cádiz after the disastrous defeat at Trafalgar, by Thomas Buttersworth

History

France
- Name: Entreprenante
- In service: 1797
- Fate: Captured by the British in 1798

Great Britain
- Name: HMS Entreprenante
- Acquired: by capture 1798
- Commissioned: 1799
- In service: Purchased November 1798 and registered 1 June 1799
- Out of service: Paid off in April 1812
- Honours and awards: Naval General Service Medal with clasps: "Egypt"; "Trafalgar"
- Fate: Broken up in June 1812

General characteristics
- Class & type: 10-gun cutter
- Tons burthen: 12659/94 (bm)
- Length: 67 ft (20.4 m) (overall), 51 ft 6 in (15.7 m) (keel)
- Beam: 21 1/2 ft (6.6 m)
- Draught: 9 ft (2.7 m) (unladen), 11 ft (3.4 m) (laden)
- Propulsion: Sails
- Complement: 40
- Armament: Originally: 10 × 4-pounder guns; From December 1803: 10 × 12-pounder carronades

HMS Entreprenante (also Entreprenant) was a 10-gun cutter that the Royal Navy captured from the French in 1798. The British commissioned her in 1799 and she served during the French Revolutionary and Napoleonic Wars, participating in the Battle of Trafalgar. She has been the only ship of the Royal Navy to bear the name. She took part in several small engagements, capturing Spanish and French ships before she was sold in 1812 for breaking up.

== Origins ==
French sources indicate that she may have been built in France in 1797. Furthermore, she may have been a privateer from Socoa, or possibly nearby Saint-Jean-de-Luz, and under the command of Ensign Dominique Délouart, of Bayonne.

== Early career ==
Entreprenante was commissioned in February 1799 under Lieutenant Charles Claridge. In April she was under the command of Lieutenant William Swiney.

On 3 March 1800, Entreprenante, Phaeton and Minotaur shared in the capture of the Madona del Grazie, which they sent into Leghorn. (Note: A petty officer's share of the prize money when it was remitted from Leghorn and available in London in 1805 was 1s 11¼d; a seaman's share was 4d.) On 29 March, Entreprenante captured a Genoese vessel from Capraia bound for Genoa with a cargo of corn. Entreprenante was among the handful of vessels that shared by agreement with Phaeton in the proceeds of the capture on 14 April by Phaeton and Peterel of the St. Rosalia. Next, Entreprenante was among the vessels that shared in the proceeds of the capture off Genoa, on 28 April, of the Proteus.

In May Entreprenante was part of a naval squadron at the Siege of Genoa (1800). The squadron also included HMS Minotaur, Phoenix, Mondovi, and the tender Victoire, all under the command of Vice-Admiral Lord Keith. (Note: Victoire may have been the privateer of two guns and 28 men that HMS Mutine had captured near Genoa on 29 March 1800.)

On 21 January 1801, Entreprenante brought dispatches to Jaffa.

Then on 2 March she protected the left flank during the landing of troops in Aboukir Bay. The schooner Malta and the gun-vessel Negresse assisted her. Cruelle protected the left flank, together with the cutter Janissary and the gun-vessel Dangereuse. In 1850, the Admiralty authorized the issue of the Naval General Service Medal with clasp "Egypt" to any surviving members of her crew that came forward to claim it. (Note: A first-class share of the prize money awarded in April 1823 was worth £34 2s 4d; a fifth-class share, that of a seaman, was worth 3s 11½d. The amount was small as the total had to be shared between 79 vessels and the entire army contingent.)

Entreprenante was paid off in December 1802. From 28 November 1802 to 7 January 1804, she was in Portsmouth, refitting.

She was recommissioned on 1 December 1803 under Lieutenant James Brown, for the Channel. On 12 April 1804, Lieutenant Robert Benjamin Young took command. On 30 May 1805, the sloop Meteor, Commander Joseph James, and Entreprenante captured the Prussian sloop Omnibus. (Note: A petty officer's share of the prize money was £13 7s 4d; an able seaman's share was £5 9s 10d. For an able seaman, this was equivalent to several months' salary.)

== Trafalgar ==
Entreprenante, under Young, was present at the Battle of Trafalgar on 21 October 1805, where she was the smallest British warship there. Entreprenante accompanied the Lee (Blue) Division under Vice-admiral Collingwood, but she took no actual part in the fighting. Towards the end of the battle, though, together with the schooner Pickle and boats from Prince and Swiftsure, she took part in rescuing some 200 men from the French ship Achille after Achille exploded. Young also found the Bahama, whose Spanish crew had overthrown the British prize crew and were attempting to take the ship back to Cádiz. Thanks to Young's fast message to Collingwood, the British swiftly retook Bahama and brought her to Gibraltar. After the battle, Entreprenante was sent to Faro, Portugal, carrying Collingwood's dispatches announcing the British victory. (Note: A petty officer's share of the prize money was £10 14s 0d; a seaman's share was £1 17s 6d. Thus for both classes, all the risks and exertions of the battle produced less monetary reward than the fortuitous capture of the Prussian merchant vessel Omnibus a few months earlier.) The Admiralty issued the Naval General Service Medal with clasp "Trafalgar" to any surviving members of Entreprenante's crew that came forward to claim it.

Still under the command of Young, Entreprenante spent 1806 in the English Channel, watching the French fleet during the blockade of Brest, France. In April 1806 she was under the command of Lieutenant John Payer, who may have been temporary; (Note: A number of accounts give John Payer, John Puyer or John Puver as the captain of Entreprenante at Trafalgar. This error was later corrected to recognize Young's role.) by January 1807 she was again under Young's command. On 28 June she was unsuccessful in rescuing the schooner Capelin, which had run onto the Parquette Rock while reconnoitering the harbour at Brest.

On 4 December 1808 Lieutenant Peter Williams replaced Young. Entreprenante continued to remain with the Channel Fleet and on 27 December she recaptured the schooner Cora.

Entreprenante sailed for Portugal on 24 May 1809. In January 1810 she was at Pera, taking on presents from the Sublime Porte intended for George III. She again sailed for the Mediterranean on 31 October 1810.

== Action off Málaga ==
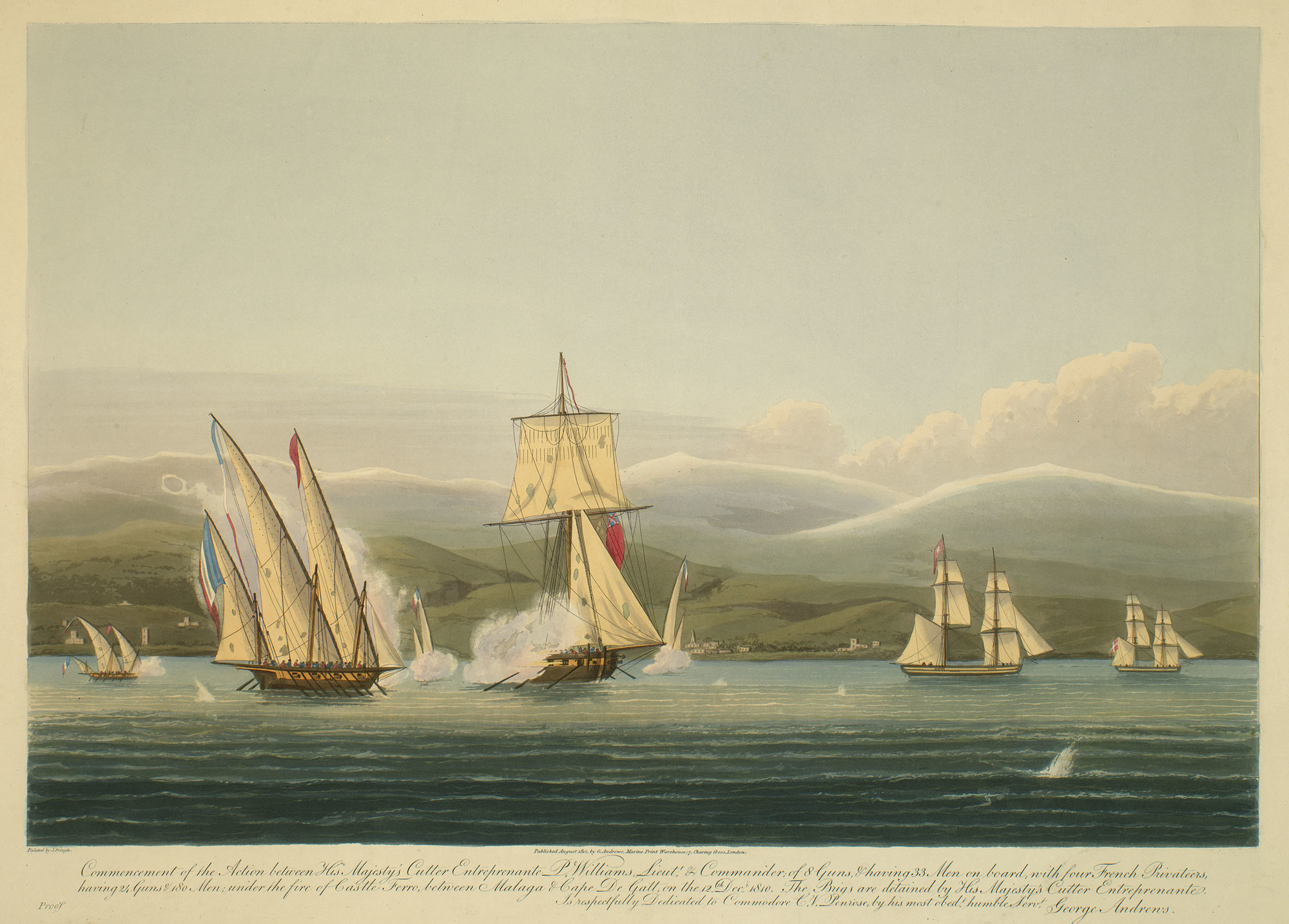
Commencement of the action between the Entreprenante with four French privateers, under the fire of Castle Ferro

Entreprenante found herself becalmed off the Spanish coast near Castle Ferro, between Málaga and Cape De Gatt on the morning of 12 December 1810. Whilst she was lying there, four French lateen-rigged privateers came out to attack her. One of the French vessels had eight guns, including two long 18-pounder guns, and 75 men. The second had five guns and a crew of 45 men. The last two each had two guns and crews of 25 men. Entreprenante was short-handed, having on board only 33 men.

Two of the privateers passed under Entreprenante's stern while the other two stood off her starboard bow and quarter. The ensuing battle lasted for four hours until the French retreated, having suffered heavy damage. During the action Entreprenante had lost her topmast and had two starboard guns disabled. She had also repulsed three attempts at boarding during which she had one man killed and ten wounded.

== Capture of the Saint Joseph ==
Entreprenante remained off the Spanish coast into 1811. On 22 April she captured the American merchant ship Hannah and her cargo.

Entreprenante next saw action on 25 April. Williams had taken her into Málaga Bay under a flag of truce to deliver a letter to the Governor, General Sabastini. Whilst on this duty, the British spotted two French privateers coming into the harbour, escorting a prize. (The privateers were two of the vessels that Entreprenante had repulsed in December 1810.) Williams collected a reply from the Governor for Lieutenant-General Colin Campbell at Gibraltar, and Entreprenante made her way out of the harbour. One privateer had already anchored off the mole, but the other and the prize were still under way. Williams closed on the privateer that was still sailing and brought her to battle. After a sharp engagement lasting 15 minutes, Entreprenante drove her on shore, severely hulled. She had been armed with six guns and had a crew of 50 men. (Note: Head money for the privateer's destruction was finally paid in late 1824. A first-class share, i.e., William's share, was worth £38 17s 1½d; a sixth-class share, i.e., an ordinary seaman's share, was worth £1 15s 10d.)

By now, the water under Entreprenante's keel was less than three fathoms (5 m) and Williams was obliged to tack. He turned his attention to the prize, and after firing a few shots, boarded her and took possession. She was the Spanish brig St. Joseph (San Jose), out of Cádiz and Gibraltar, and had been captured whilst sailing to Tarragona. Williams took her in tow and sailed her out of the harbour. Hundreds of spectators on the mole head at Málaga watched the action. Entreprenante accomplished the entire engagement without taking any casualties. This was to be Entreprenante's last action.

== Fate ==
Entreprenante arrived at Plymouth on 22 March 1812 with dispatches from the Mediterranean, Gibraltar, and Cádiz. She was paid off in April 1812. Entreprenante was broken up in June 1812, after more than a decade of distinguished service.
