= HMS Janissary =

Gunboat of the Royal Navy

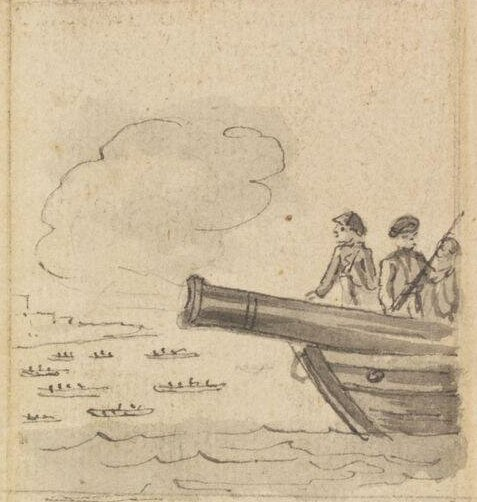
c. 1801 cartoon of Janissary by Sir Robert Ker Porter

HMS Janissary was a gunboat of the Royal Navy that served in the British invasion of French-occupied Egypt in 1801. She appears in historical records only in connection with the invasion and her origins before 1800 or service after 1801 are lost. The gunboat was named after the janissaries, a body of Ottoman troops. On 2 March, under the command of Lieutenant John Whilley, Janissary along with the cutter Cruelle and gunboat Dangereuse protected the left flank of British troops landing in Aboukir Bay. The cutter Entreprenante, schooner Malta and gunboat Negresse covered the right flank. Janissary's officers and crew therefore qualified for the clasp "Egypt" to the Naval General Service Medal that the British Admiralty authorised in 1850 to all surviving claimants.
