= HMS Eclipse (1804) =

Brig of the Royal Navy

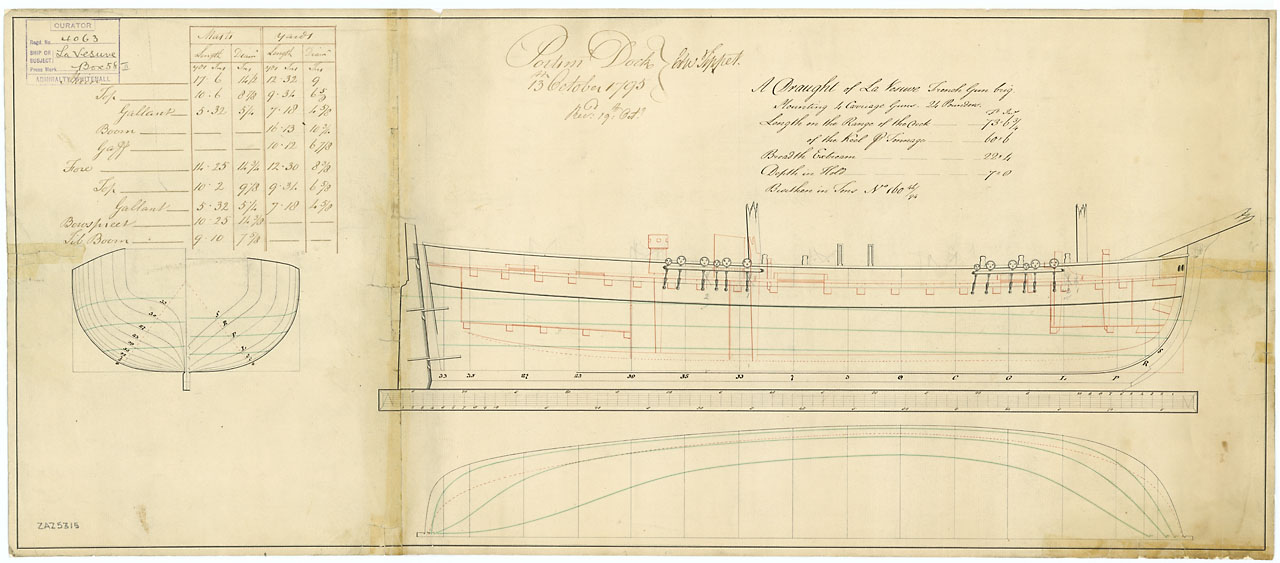
- Plans of Vésuve, lead ship of the class

History

France
- Name: Volage
- Builder: Lemarchand, Saint-Malo
- Laid down: March 1793
- Launched: May 1793
- In service: June 1793
- Renamed: Venteux (May 1795)
- Captured: 27 June 1803

United Kingdom
- Name: HMS Eagle
- Acquired: 1803 by capture
- Commissioned: September 1803
- Renamed: HMS Eclipse (1804)
- Fate: Sold April 1807

General characteristics
- Class & type: Vésuve-class gunbrig
- Tons burthen: 158 (bm)
- Length: Overall:74 ft 2 1/2 in (22.6 m); Keel:59 ft 8 3/4 in (18.2 m)
- Beam: 22 ft 3 5/8 in (6.8 m)
- Depth of hold: 7 ft 5 in (2.3 m)
- Complement: French navy:82; Royal Navy:55
- Armament: French navy: 4 × 18-pounder long guns; 6 × 36-pounder brass carronades (Note: At the time, brass 36-pounder carronades were generally obusiers de vaisseau.); Royal Navy: Upper deck: 10 × 32–pounder carronades; QD:2 × 18-pounder guns

HMS Eclipse was a French Navy Vésuve-class brick-canonnier or chaloupe-canonnière, (gunbrig) launched at Saint-Malo in 1793 as Volage. She was renamed Venteux in 1795 (possibly also Vérité on 30 May 1795, although this might have been a second ship of the same name. The British Royal Navy captured her in 1803 and took her into service as HMS Eagle, but then renamed her HMS Eclipse in 1804. She had a completely unremarkable career before the Navy sold her in 1807.

== French Navy ==
Between 23 September 1793 and 17 December, Volage was under the command of lieutenant de vaisseau Corouge. She was stationed at Paimpol and her role was escorting convoys between Saint-Malo and Brest.

Between 12 February 1794 and 11 June she was still under Corouge's command and escorting convoys between Saint-Malo and Brest. She was variously stationed at Saint-Malo Roads, Aber Wrac'h, the Chausey islands, and the Bay of Cancale. Corouge's successor, at least until 23 December 1794, was enseigne de vaisseau Le Gonidec.

22 March 1795 and 3 May, Volage, under the command of now lieutenant de vaisseau Le Gonidec, cruised the bay of Saint-Brieuc before returning to Saint-Malo. In May 1795, she departed Brest to transfer to Guadeloupe. In April 1798, she was based at Saint Malo and used to escort convoys.

Capture: On 27 June 1803 boats from HMS Loire captured Venteux at the Île de Batz, where she was sheltering under the guns of shore batteries. The British boarded her, and though outnumbered, in a fierce 10-minute struggle succeeded in taking her over. British casualties were six men wounded, one seriously and two mortally. French casualties were three men killed, one of them her second captain. Venteux also had the captain (lieutenant de vaisseau François-Gilles Montfort), her four remaining officers, and eight seamen wounded. In 1847 the Admiralty recognized the action with the clasp "27 June Boat Service 1803" to the Naval General Service Medal, awarded to all surviving claimants from the action.

== Royal Navy ==
The Royal Navy took Venteux in as HMS Eagle. She underwent fitting between June 1803 and March 1804 at Plymouth. She was commissioned under Lieutenant George Samuel Harris in September 1803.

In February 1804 the Navy launched a new 74-gun ship that it named Eagle. As the Navy preferred not to have two vessels with the same name, it renamed the brig Eclipse. In August Lieutenant George Norton recommissioned Eclipse. In 1805 she may have been under the command of George Price.

When HMS Pigmy was wrecked at Saint Aubin, Jersey, on 9 August 1805, Eclipse was one of the Royal Navy vessels whose boats took off Pigmy's crew.

Eclipse went into Ordinary at Portsmouth in 1807.

== Fate ==
The "Principal Officers and Commissioners of His Majesty's Navy" offered "His Majesty's Gun-Brig Eclipse, lying at Portsmouth" for sale on 2 April 1807. She sold there in April.
