= French corvette Diligente (1794) =

French Navy Naïade-class corvette launched as a brig in 1794

Diligente
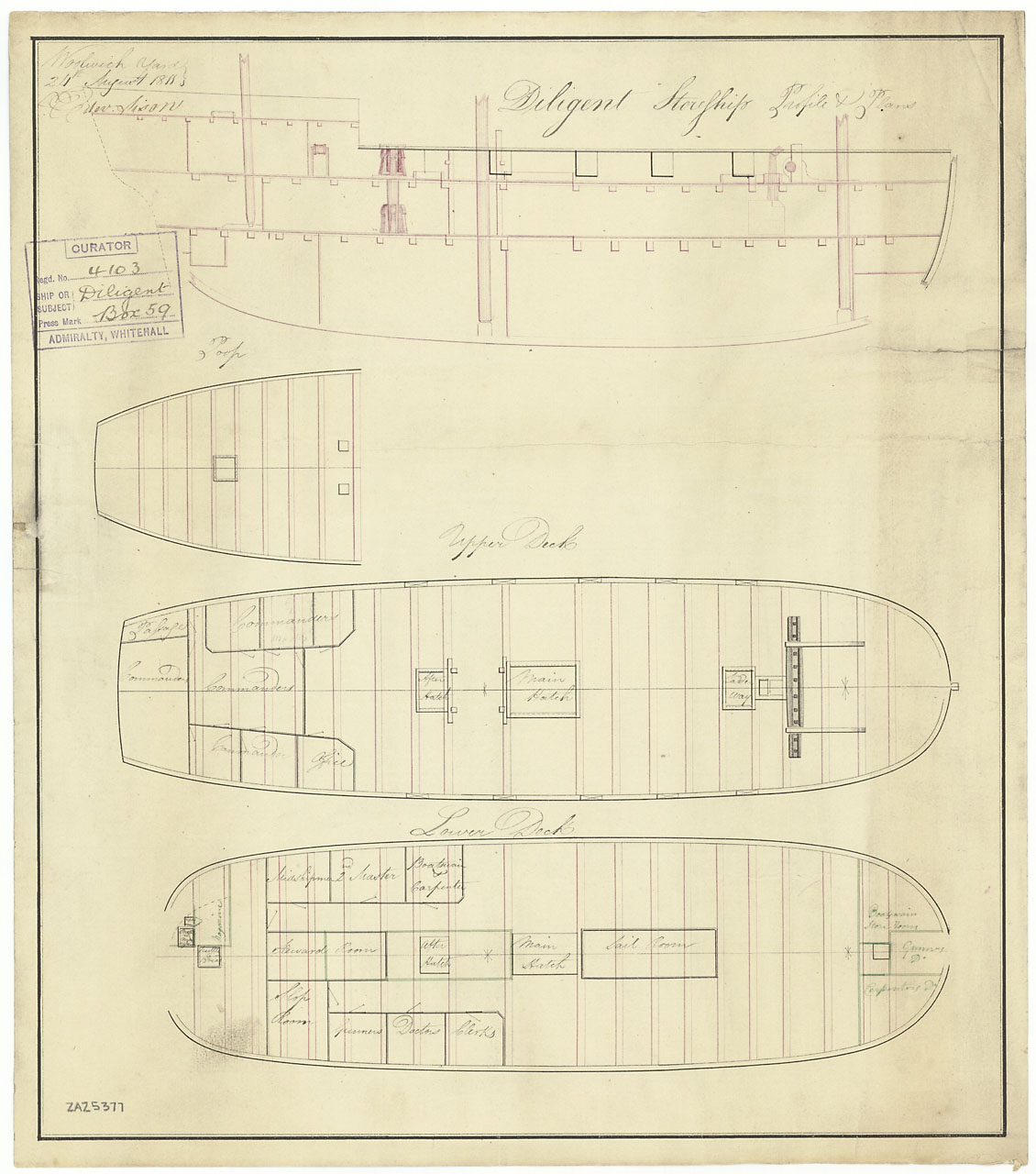
- Incomplete plan 1811 by Edward Sison, Master Shipwright, Woolwich Dockyard, National Maritime Museum

History

France
- Name: Diligente
- Builder: Brest Dockyard
- Laid down: June 1793
- Launched: 17 January 1794
- Captured: June 1800

Great Britain
- Name: HMS Diligente
- Acquired: June 1800 by capture
- Fate: Sold August 1814

General characteristics
- Displacement: 461 tons (French)
- Tons burthen: 348 14/94 (by calc.) (bm)
- Length: 31.75 m (104.2 ft) (overall)
- Beam: 8.31 m (27.3 ft)
- Depth of hold: 4.17 m (13.7 ft)
- Complement: French service:187 (130 at capture)
- Armament: Originally: 12 × 18-pounder guns + 6 × 36-pounder obussiers; 1795: 12 × 18-pounder guns; 1797 and at capture: 12 × 12-pounder guns; British service: 14 guns

Diligente was a French Navy Naïade-class corvette, launched in 1794 as a brig. HMS Crescent captured her in the Antilles in 1800. The British took her into service as a 14-gun transport and sold her in 1814.

== French service ==
Diligente was a sister ship to Naïade. They were built to a plan by Pierre-Agustin Lamothe. The Royal Navy captured Naïade in 1806 and took her into service as HMS Melville; she was sold for breaking up in 1811.

Between 30 Mar 1794 and 29 May, Diligente was under the command of lieutenant de vaisseau Lacouture. Then from 9 June to 15 December Diligente was under the command of lieutenant de vaisseau Noguez. Under these lieutenants' command, Diligente conducted a cruise into the Bay of Biscay, returning to Lorient, visited Brest, cruised into the Atlantic, escorted a convoy to the Île-d'Aix roads, cruised the region around the Azores and returned to Brest, and escorted a convoy from Camaret to Saint-Malo.

Between 18 March 1795 and 25 July Diligente was in Saint-Malo roads, cruised in the bay of Saint-Brieuc and bay of Granville, and returned to Saint Malo.

Around 17 July 1797, Diligente escorted a convoy from Mindin (opposite Saint-Nazaire) to Larmor, while still under Noguez's command, who had by then been promoted to capitaine de frégate.

Quasi War:On 6 September, 1799, under command of "Citizen" Du Bois, she captured American merchantman "America" at (28°00′N 35°00′W) in the Atlantic Ocean. War of Knives and Quasi War:Shortly after 3 December, 1799 she encountered USS Boston , but no action took place as she was convoying troops of General Toussaint for the Haitian Revolution, seemingly carrying a US pass. Anchored at Cape Nicola, St Domingo on 7 December, 1799.

== Capture ==
In July 1800 the frigate HMS Crescent captured Diligente, which was armed with twelve 12-pounder guns and had a crew of 130 men. The Royal Navy took her into service as a 14-gun transport under her existing name.

== Royal Navy service ==
There is little information readily available on line about the storeship Diligente's career as she was never registered. The National Maritime Museum (NMM) has a drawing of her lines, made in 1811. The NMM describes her as serving as a storeship at Woolwich. (Note: The NMM database does not have a Diligente captured in 1800, but it does have one that it conjectures was captured in 1804. It then lists three masters, ending in 1814. This would be consistent with a storeship Diligente that was sold in 1814.)

In 1807 Rcd. Turner was master.

In 1809 Thomas Miller was appointed to the Diligente storeship.

In 1810 Mr. T. Hoskins was appointed to command the Diligente store-ship.

In 1812-1813 Edward Ives was master.

Lastly, Donald McDonald was master in 1814.
