= Vésuve-class gunbrig =

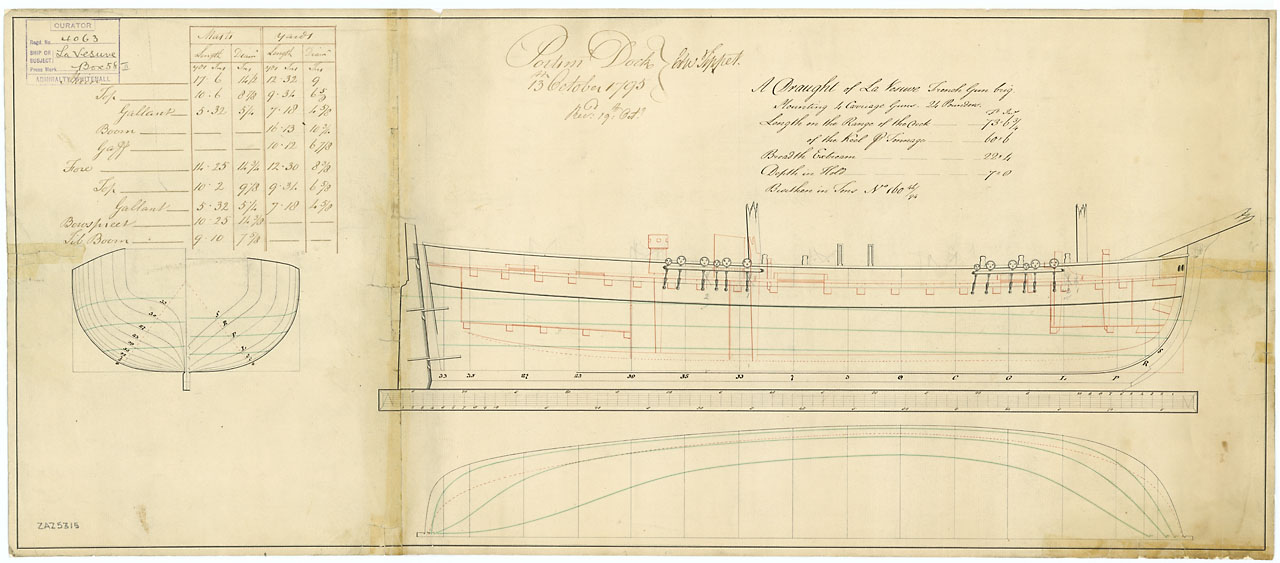
- Plans of Vésuve as surveyed by the British after her capture

Class overview
- Name: Vésuve
- Operators: French Navy; Royal Navy
- In commission: 1793-1810
- Completed: 7

General characteristics
- Class & type: Vésuve
- Type: gunbrig
- Displacement: 80 ton (French)
- Length: 22.7 metres
- Beam: 6.5 metres
- Draught: 2.4 metres
- Propulsion: Sail
- Complement: 122-198
- Armament: Design: 4 × 24-pounder long guns; French navy: 4 × 18-pounder long guns; 6 × 36-pounder brass carronades (Note: At the time, brass 36-pounder carronades were generally obusiers de vaisseau.); Royal Navy: Upper deck: 10 × 32–pounder carronades; QD:2 × 18-pounder guns
- Armour: Timber

The Vésuve class was a class of seven 4-gun gunbrigs (bricks-canonniers).

The Royal Navy captured three of the seven vessels in the class and took them into British service.

== Vésuve class (7 ships) ==
- Vésuve

Builder:
Begun: February 1793
Launched: May 1793
Completed: June 1793
Fate: Captured by HMS Melampus and HMS Hebe on 3 July 1795. Commissioned in the Royal Navy as HMS Vesuve, sold in 1802

- Volage

Builder: Lemarchand, Saint-Malo
Begun: March 1793
Launched: May 1793
Completed: June 1793
Fate: Captured in 1803 by boats from HMS Loire; sold in 1807

- Cruelle

Builder:
Begun:
Launched:
Completed:
Fate:
Notes:

- Foudre

Builder: Saint Malo
Begun: 1793
Launched: January 1794
Completed: February 1794
Fate: Struck in Saint Valéry en Caux in December 1798
Notes: Renamed Fantôme in May 1795

- Hargneuse

Builder: Saint Malo
Begun: 1792
Launched: September 1793
Completed: September 1793
Fate: Decommissioned in Brest in February 1810
Notes: renamed Canonnière n°14 in May 1801

- Protectrice

Builder: Saint Malo
Begun: March 1793
Launched: August 1793
Completed: September 1793
Fate: Decommissioned on 31 March 1807
Notes:

- Vaillante

Builder: Saint Malo
Begun: 1793
Launched: 1793
Completed: June 1793
Fate: Ran aground in combat against Lapwing, then destroyed by gunfire on 29 November 1796
