= Lady Shore (1793 ship) =

Coordinates: 19°S 36°W

History

Great Britain
- Name: Lady Shore
- Namesake: Lady Charlotte Shore, wife of Sir John Shore
- Owner: Thomas Walton, Jr.
- Builder: Hull, England,
- Launched: 17 August 1793
- Fate: Lost 1815

General characteristics
- Tons burthen: 315, or 31574/94, or 327 (bm)
- Length: 98 ft 4 in (30.0 m) (overall); 77 ft 6 3/4 in (23.6 m) (keel)
- Beam: 27 ft 8 in (8.4 m)
- Depth of hold: 16 ft 9 in (5.1 m)
- Sail plan: Barque or ship rigged
- Complement: 27
- Armament: 10 × 3- & 4-pounder guns
- Notes: This vessel is usually conflated with Lady Shore (1794 ship)

Lady Shore was a barque-rigged merchantman, launched in 1793 at Hull, England. She made two voyages as an "extra ship" (i.e., under charter) for the British East India Company (EIC), though capture by a French privateer cut short the second. She then returned to mercantile service, sailing primarily to the West Indies. She was wrecked near the Saint Lawrence River in 1815.

== Voyages to Bengal ==
Lady Shore's first voyage was as an "extra ship" in the services of the East India Company. Under Captain John Christopher she sailed under a letter of marque dated 3 June 1794. She sailed from Plymouth on 22 June 1794, bound for Bengal. She reached the Cape of Good Hope on 25 September, and Calcutta on 17 January 1795. On her return leg she was at Diamond Harbour on 16 March, Saint Helena on 1 June, the River Shannon on 13 September, and The Downs on 13 October.

Her second voyage was more eventful. Captain Christopher sailed for Bengal again in 1796, but on 19 July the French corvette Moineau captured her off the Cape of Good Hope. Moineau was armed with twenty-six 9-pounder guns and had a crew of 190 men under the command of Commander Tayeau. (Note: Christopher apparently died on the way, as this information comes from a journal by James Wilson, who describes himself as the commander of the Lady Shore. French sources give her armament as 16 guns.) He was sailing from Mauritius to Bordeaux when he encountered Lady Shore. The French took only a few prisoners, looted her stores and cargo, and then allowed her to proceed to the Cape.

The French released Lady Shore in Simon's Bay on 22 July. She left the Cape on 2 September and St Helena on 20 September. She reached The Downs in November.

== Subsequent career ==
Lady Shore, of 316 tons (bm), launched in Hull in 1793, appears in Lloyd's Register in 1799. In March 1803, Lloyd's List reported that Lady Shore had left Gibraltar on 11 February in a convoy under the escort of HMS Halcyon.

Year	Master	Owner	Trade	Notes
1799	Watson; L. Row	Campbell	London-Jamaica	10 × 4-pounder guns
1800	L. Row	Maillard	London-Antigua	6 × 4 & 4 × 3-pounder guns
1801	L. Row	Maillard	London-Antigua	6 × 4 & 4 × 3-pounder guns
1802	L. Row	Maillard	London-Antigua	6 × 4 & 4 × 3-pounder guns
1803	L. Row	Maillard	London-Antigua; London-America	No armament described
1804	L. Row	Maillard	London-Antigua	No armament described
1805	L. Row	Maillard	London-Antigua	No armament described
1806	J. Row c? Row	Maillard	London-Antigua; London transport	8 × 18-pounder carronades
1807				No entry
1808	Row	Old & Co.	London transport	8 × 18-pounder carronades
1809	I. Row	T. Old	London transport	Register of Shipping; Pages missing in Lloyd's Register
1810	Row	Old & Co.	London transport	8 × 18-pounder carronades
1811	Row	Old & Co.	London transport	8 × 18-pounder carronades
1812	Row	Old & Co.	London transport	8 × 18-pounder carronades
1813	Row; Watson	Old & Co.	London transport	8 × 18-pounder carronades
1814	C. Watson	Old & Co.	London transport	8 × 18-pounder carronades
1815	C. Watson	Old & Co.	London transport	8 × 18-pounder carronades
1816				Lost; no longer listed

Lloyd's List reported that the "Lady Shore Transport" had run aground at Margate on the morning of 29 November 1814, but that she had been gotten off the next day with only the loss of an anchor. Some boats then brought her into Westgate Bay.

== Fate ==
In July 1815, Lloyd's List reported that the transports Lady Shore, Watson, master, Fame, Shaw, master, Adamant, and Robert and Mary had all been lost near the Saint Lawrence River while sailing to Quebec.
