= Tartane =

Ship used for both fishing and trading

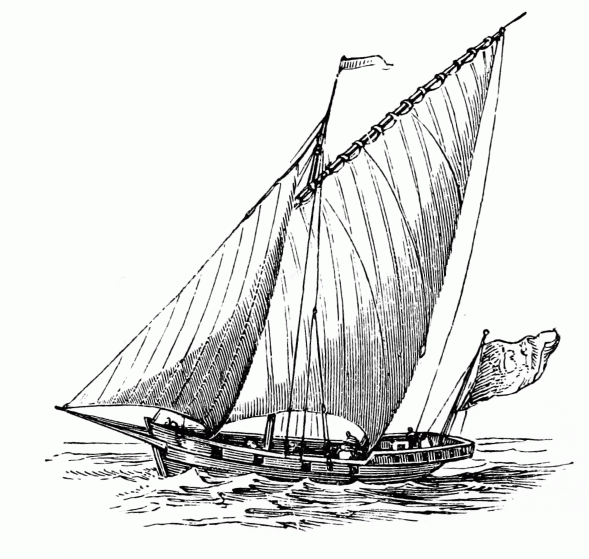
A 19th-century engraving of a tartane.

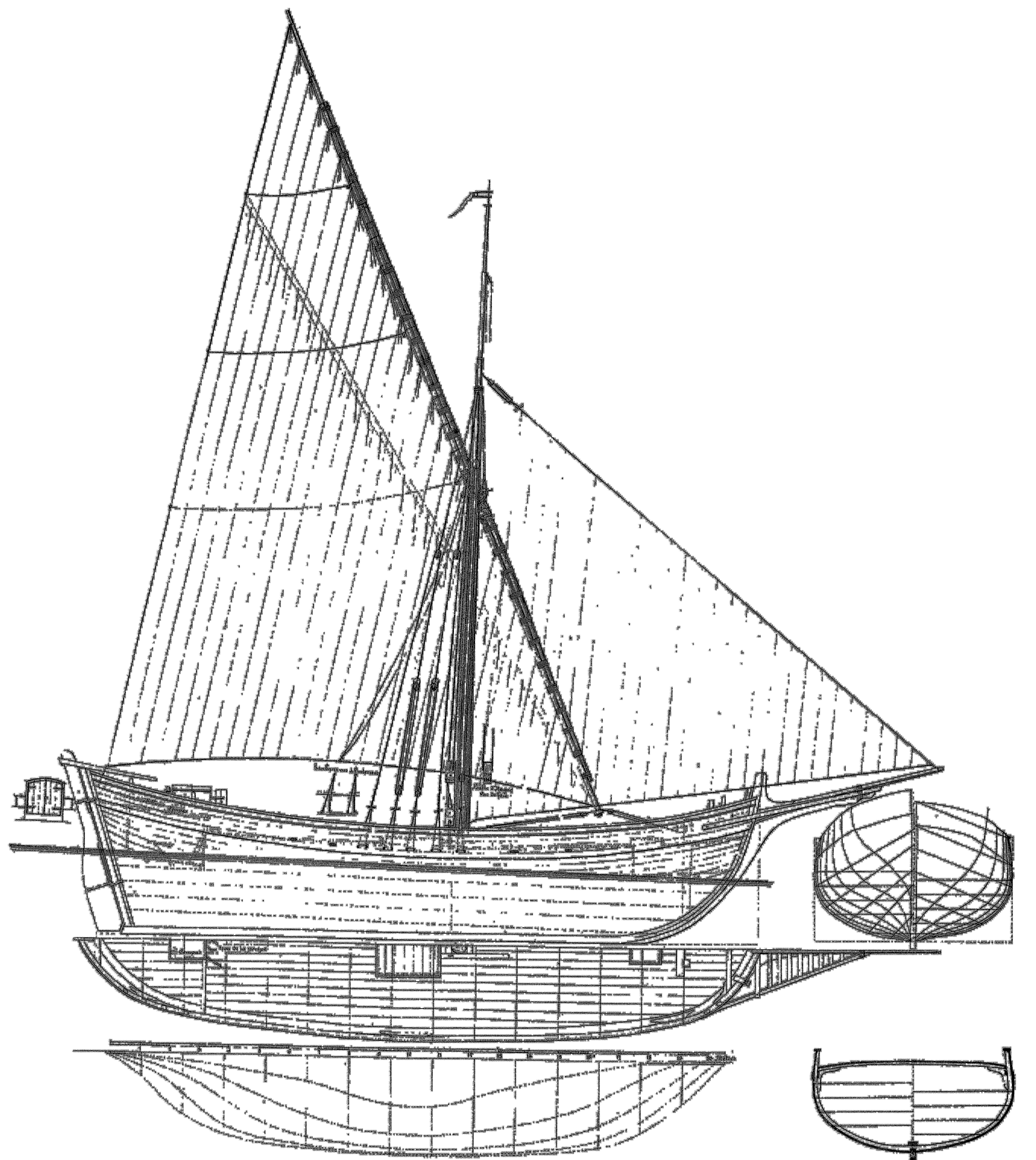
Diagram of a tartana, 1879

A tartane (also tartan, tartana) was a small ship used both as a fishing ship and for coastal trading in the Mediterranean. They were in use for over 300 years until the late 19th century. A tartane had a single mast on which was rigged a large lateen sail, and with a bowsprit and fore-sail. When the wind was aft a square sail was generally hoisted like a cross jack.
