= French corvette Naïade (1793) =

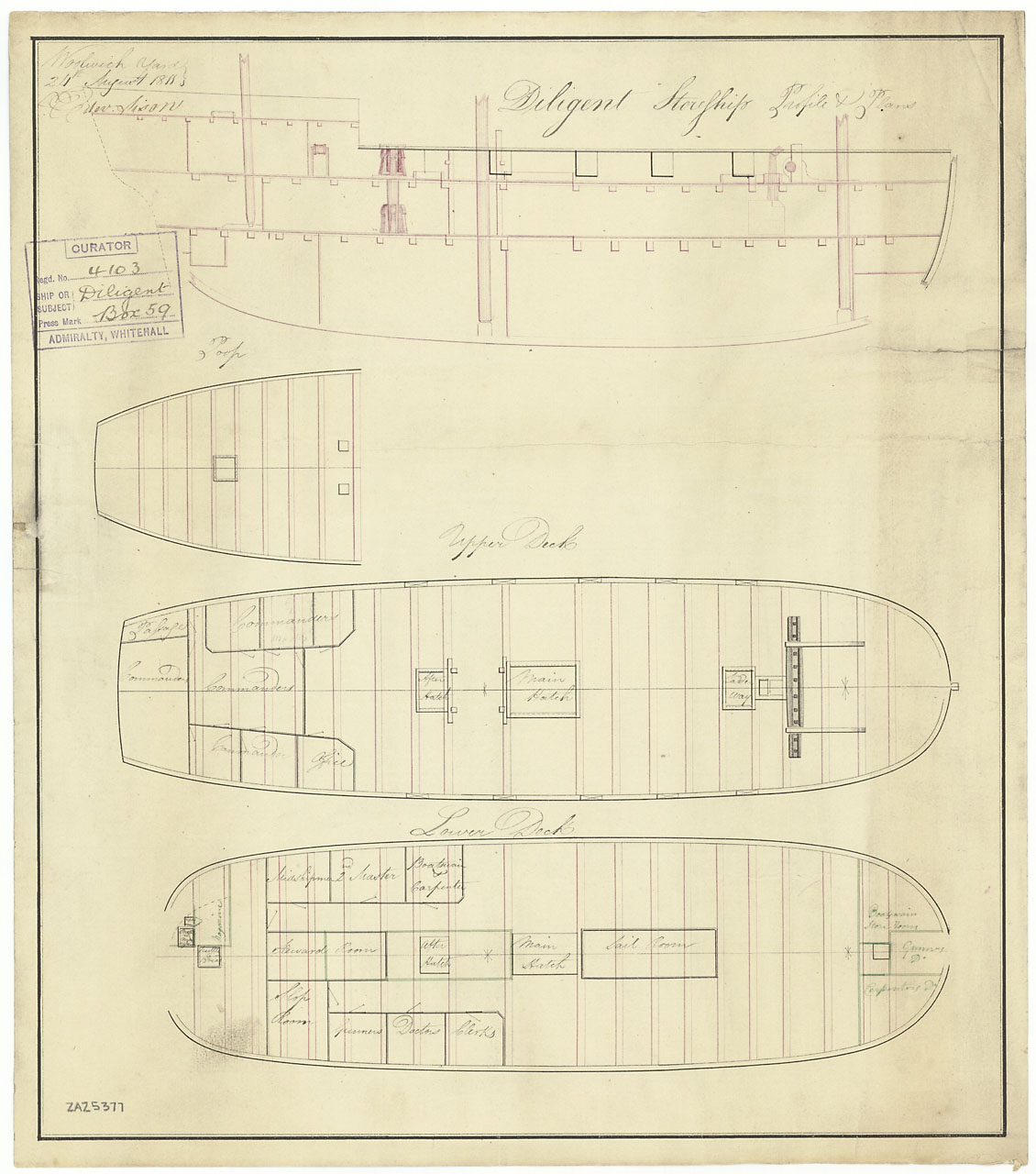
- Incomplete plan of Diligente, sister ship to Naïade, drawn 1811 by Edward Sison, Master Shipwright, Woolwich Dockyard, National Maritime Museum

History

France
- Name: Naïade
- Builder: Brest dockyard
- Laid down: May 1793
- Launched: 24 October 1793
- Captured: 1805

United Kingdom
- Name: HMS Melville
- Acquired: 1805 (by capture)
- Fate: Broken up 1811

General characteristics
- Type: Brig
- Displacement: 270 tons (French; unladen)
- Tons burthen: 353 (bm)
- Length: 31.75 m (104.2 ft) (overall)
- Beam: 8.31 m (27.3 ft)
- Depth of hold: 4.17 m (13.7 ft)
- Sail plan: ship-sloop (1806 on)
- Complement: French service: 187; At capture: 170
- Armament: French service; Originally: 12 × 12-pounder guns + 4 × 6-pounder guns; 1798:16 × 8-pounder guns; 1800: 16 × 12-pounder guns; 1804: 18 × 12-pounder guns; At capture: 16 × 12-pounder guns + 4 × 2-pounder swivel guns; HMS:16 × 32-pounder carronades + 2 × 6-pounder chase guns

The French corvette Naïade was launched at Brest in 1793 as a brig-corvette for the French Navy. The Royal Navy captured her in 1805 and took her into service as HMS Melville. She was sold for breaking up in 1808.

== French service ==
Naïade was built to a plan by Pierre-Agustin Lamothe and was the name ship of her three-vessel class. The Royal Navy captured one sister ship, Diligente, in 1800 and employed her as a 14-gun transport until they sold her in 1814.

=== French Revolutionary Wars ===
The French Navy employed Naïade to patrol and escort convoys between Ouessant and Socoa. She then escorted a convoy between Ostend and Dunkirk. Lastly, she cruised in the North Sea and the Pas-de-Calais. Then she was stationed at Flessingue. During this time she was first under the command of lieutenant de vaisseau Julien (24 February 1794 to 17 May 1794), and then lieutenant de vaisseau Léonard (1-22 December 1794).

On 25 February 1796 Naïade captured Truro, Mackie, master, and Gibraltar, Wray, master. Truro was on her way from London to Leith, while Gibraltar was on her way to Greenland and the northern whale fishery. The privateer burnt Gibraltar. Captain Wray returned to Hull on 11 March and reported what had transpired. Gibraltar had been 6 or 7 miles off Shields when the French privateer brig Nayade, of 16 guns, Captain Leonard, had captured her. Leonard had removed Gibraltar's crew in her boats, and had set her on fire.

That evening Nayade had encountered HMS Star, one of two cutters that had been dispatched from the Firth of Forth to look for the privateer. (Note: There is no record of a Royal Navy cutter or hired armed vessel by that name based in the North Sea. There is even no record of a revenue cutter by that name in 1797.) The engagement, which lasted all night, cost Star one man killed and several men wounded. Nayade broke off the engagement in the morning and sailed to France. Captain Wray and his men were imprisoned at Dunkirk for four days before they were exchanged.

=== Napoleonic Wars ===
At some point Naïade transferred to the Caribbean.

Naïade and Cyane left Martinique on 29 September 1805 provisioned for a cruise of three months. Enseigne de vaisseau Hamon, who had assumed command of Naïade shortly before they sailed, was the senior officer of the pair.

Six days later HMS Princess Charlotte was off Tobago when she sighted them in the distance. The two French vessels were too far away for Princess Charlotte to chase them. Captain George Tobin of Princess Charlotte decided to disguise his vessel as best he could in the hope that he could lure them to approach. He was successful and an engagement ensued.

Eventually, Princess Charlotte succeeded in capturing Cyane, which had been a Royal Navy sloop until the French had captured her in May; Naïade as Tobin put it, "by taking a more prudent Situation and superior sailing, effected her Escape without any apparent Injury."

== Capture ==
On 13 October 1805 HMS Jason captured Naiade off Barbados (14°5′N 55°48′W) after a chase of nine hours. She was pierced for 22 guns, but mounted sixteen 12-pounder guns and four brass 2-pounder swivels. She had a crew of 170 men under the command of lieutenant de vaisseau Hamon, and had had one man killed before she surrendered. She had come out from France the previous March with the Toulon squadron and was 15 days out of Martinique, provisioned for a two-month cruise. Captain P.W. Champain of Jason described her as, " one of the largest Brigs in the French Service; extremely well fitted, fails very fast, (having escaped from many of our Cruizers,) and appears particularly calculated for His Majesty's Service."

== British service ==
The Royal Navy re-rigged Naiade on 25 May 1806 as a ship-sloop under the name HMS Melville. The Navy then commissioned her in August at Antigua under Commander the Honourable James William King; he was promoted to commander and into Melville on 25 August 1806.

Kingfisher captured on 16 December the French privateer Elizabeth, out of Guadaloupe after a 12-hour chase. Elizabeth had captured Cambrian after Cambrian had left a convoy on 28 October. Melville recaptured Cambrian, which had been carrying a cargo of coal from Cork to Jamaica.

Melville served in the squadron under Rear-Admiral Alexander Cochrane, in Belleisle, that was sent to occupy the Danish West Indies. The actual occupation of the Danish West Indies did not occur until 7 December, after receipt of news of the second battle of Copenhagen. (Note: A first class share of the prize money awarded in 1816, i.e., the share accruing to Tancock and each of the other captains and commanders, was worth £398 10s 3½d; a fifth-class share, that of a seaman in the fleet, was worth £1 18s 10d.)

A notice of a head money payment states that at some point King and Melville captured the privateers Pensee and Favorite. (Note: Unfortunately, the letter in the London Gazette is not informative. There are two candidate French privateers that were in the theatre during the relevant period, but at this point it would probably require original research to be more certain, either way. The only privateer Pensée for which there is any independent record is a schooner based in Martinique that is known to have performed a cruise under Captain Morisseau in March–April 1807. A possible Favorite is the former Royal Navy sloop Favorite that Jason recaptured in January 1807. This is the only French privateer Favorite listed as being in the theatre at the time. Melville could well have been in sight at the capture.)

Melville arrived at Deptford on 18 July 1808. King transferred on 29 July into Pelorus, which he commissioned in Britain.

== Fate ==
The Principal Officers and Commissioners of His Majesty's Navy offered "Melville sloop...lying at Deptford" for sale on 3 November 1808. She was sold that day.
