= HMS Vesuve =

British gunboat (1795–1802)

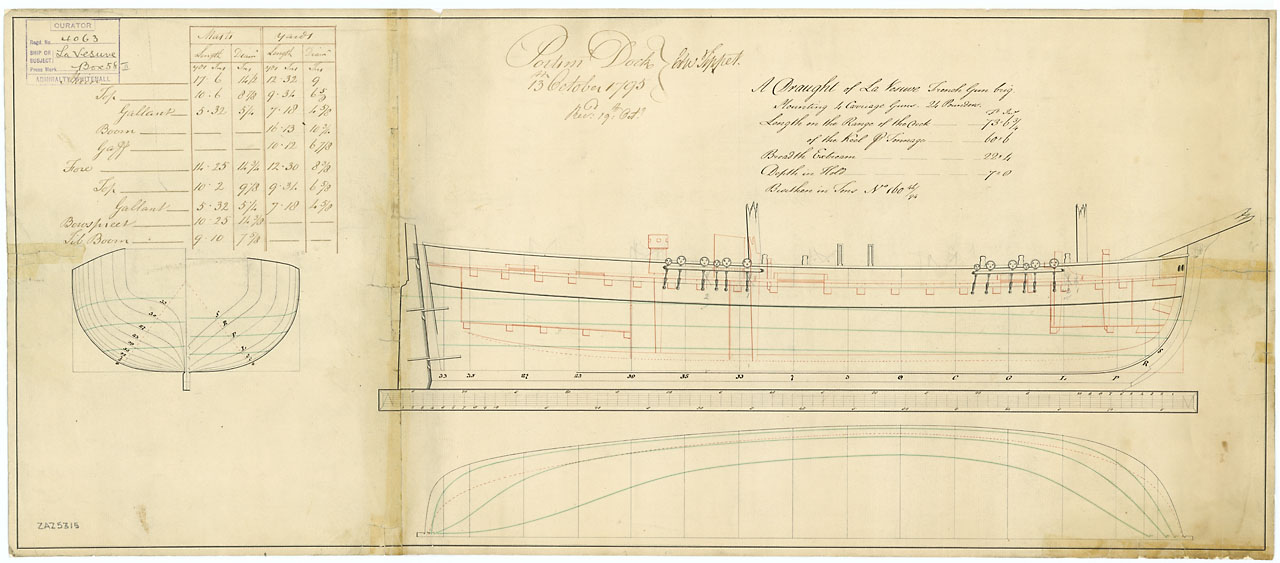
- Vesuve

History

France
- Name: Vésuve
- Namesake: Vesuvius
- Builder: probably Lemarchand, Saint-Malo
- Laid down: February 1793
- Launched: May 1793
- Renamed: Vedette (30 May 1795), but vessel captured before implementation
- Captured: 3 July 1795

Great Britain
- Name: HMS Vesuve
- Acquired: 3 July 1795 by capture
- Fate: Sold 1802

General characteristics
- Class & type: Vesuve-class gun-brig
- Displacement: 140 tons (French)
- Tons burthen: 16048/94 (bm)
- Length: 73 ft 6 3/4 in (22.4 m) (overall); 60 ft 6 in (18.4 m) (keel)
- Beam: 22 ft 4 in (6.8 m)
- Depth of hold: 7 ft 8 in (2.3 m)
- Propulsion: Sails
- Sail plan: Brig
- Complement: French service:53; RN service:68
- Armament: French service: 4 × 24-pounder guns + 2 × swivel guns; British service: 3 × 18-pounder guns in the upper deck, or 4 × 68-pounder carronades + 6 × 18-pounder carronades

HMS Vesuve was the French brick-cannonière Vésuve, name vessel of her class of seven bricks-cannonière. She was launched at Saint-Malo in 1793. The British Royal Navy captured her in 1795 and took her into service as HMS Vesuve. The Navy sold her in 1802.

== French career ==
The cannonière Vésuve was under the command of lieutenant de vaisseau non entretenu Desguetz on 22 October 1793. (Note: In the rank of "lieutenant de vaisseau non entretenu", "non entrentenu" means "not paid", or "without a salary". The rank was that of lieutenant, but junior to a "lieutenant de vaisseau entretenu". In addition to not being paid, an officer "non entretenu" would wear the uniform and have authority only when on service. There was a fixed number of positions for "entretenus", which required a competitive examination, while there was no limit on the number of "non entretenus", and one could obtain the status by a simple examination or by captaining a merchantman.) She had been stationed in the bay of Cancale, then at Cap Fréhel. She escorted convoys between Granville and Aber Benoît.

Between 9 January and 21 September 1794, Vésuve was still under Desguetz's command. (During this period he received promotion to lieutenant de vaisseau.) She escorted convoys between Paimpol and Granville, and conducted liaison missions between Granville and Saint-Malo. She was successively stationed at Hébihens, Cancale, and Bréhat Roads.

Between 4 February and her capture Vésuve was under the command of lieutenant de vaisseau non entretenu Nicholas Guidelou. She escorted convoys between Saint-Malo and the island of Bréhat, and was stationed at the Bay of Paimpol.

== Capture ==
On 3 July 1795 Melampus and Hebe intercepted a convoy of 13 vessels off St Malo. Melampus captured an armed brig and Hebe captured six merchant vessels: Maria Louisa, Abeille, Bon Foi, Patrouille, Eleonore, and Pecheur. The brig of war was armed with four 24-pounders and had a crew of 60 men. Later she was identified as the 4-gun Vésuve. The convoy had been on its way from Île-de-Bréhat to Brest. Seaflower, Daphne, and the cutter Sprightly shared in the prize and head money. The Royal Navy took Vésuve into service under her existing name.

== Royal Navy career ==
The Navy commissioned Vesuve in September 1795 under the command of Lieutenant Henry Garrett, for The Downs. In 1797 Lieutenant William Elliot replaced Garrett. In May 1798 she participated in the expedition to Ostend. (Note: A description of the expedition lists Vesuve as a gun-vessel of four guns.) In August 1799 Vesuve escorted a convoy of 14 vessels from Embden to Hull.

In 1801 Lieutenant Benjamin Crispin sailed Vesuve for the Baltic. (Note: A listing of the vessels in commission in 1802 describes Vesuve as being armed with 12 guns.)

== Fate ==
The "Principal Officers and Commissioners of His Majesty's Navy" offered "Vesuve Gun-Vessel, 160 Tons, Copper-bottomed and Copper Braces and Pintles, lying at Sheerness" for sale on 1 December 1802. The Royal Navy sold Vesuve on that day.
