= HMS Dryad (1795) =

British naval sailing frigate 1795–1860

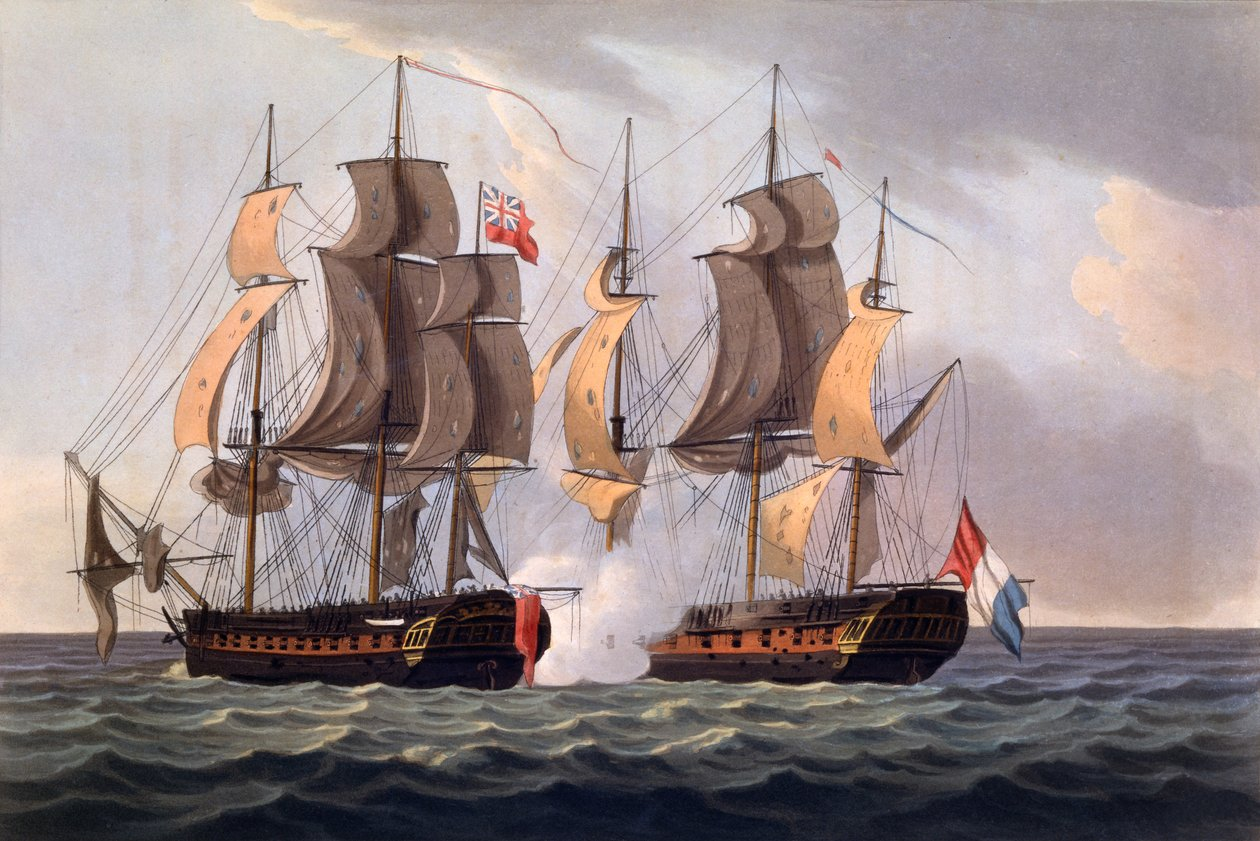
- HMS Dryad taking the French frigate Proserpine as a prize, 13 June 1796, by Thomas Whitcombe

History

Great Britain
- Name: HMS Dryad
- Ordered: 24 May 1794
- Builder: William Barnard, Deptford
- Laid down: June 1794
- Launched: 4 June 1795
- Decommissioned: 13 September 1832
- Out of service: 1814–1827
- Honours and awards: Naval General Service Medal (NGSM) with clasp "Dryad 13 June 1796"
- Fate: Harbour receiving ship 1832–1859; Broken up 1859

General characteristics
- Class & type: 36-gun fifth-rate frigate
- Tons burthen: 9246/94 (bm)
- Length: 142 ft 8 in (43.5 m) (overall); 119 ft 0 in (36.3 m) (overall)
- Beam: 38 ft 2 1/2 in (11.6 m)
- Depth of hold: 13 ft 5 in (4.1 m)
- Sail plan: Ship rigged
- Complement: 264
- Armament: Upper deck: 26 × 18-pounder guns; QD: 8 × 9-pounder guns + 6 × 32-pounder carronades; Fc: 2 × 9-pounder guns + 4 × 32-pounder carronades

HMS Dryad was a fifth-rate sailing frigate of the Royal Navy that served for 64 years, at first during the Napoleonic Wars and then in the suppression of slavery. She fought in a notable single-ship action in 1796 when she captured the French frigate Proserpine, an action that would later earn her crew the Naval General Service Medal. Dryad was broken up at Portsmouth in 1860.

== French Revolutionary Wars ==
=== Launch and the loss of Captain Forbes (1795) ===
Built by William Barnard at Deptford and launched on 4 June 1795, Dryad was commissioned under Captain the Hon. Robert Allaster Cam Forbes (2nd son of Lord Forbes), who had previously been the captain of Southampton at the Glorious First of June. The brand new frigate may have been a reward for his services, but he did not live long to enjoy it; The Edinburgh Magazine reported his death (by drowning) as: "7 Oct, off the coast of Norway, the Honourable Capt. Robert Forbes, commander of his Majesty's ship Dryad".

=== Capture of Proserpine (1796) ===
Forbes' successor, Captain Lord Amelius Beauclerk, 3rd son of the Duke of St Albans, took command in December 1795. Dryad was then stationed off the coast of Ireland. On 2 May 1796, while Dryad was under acting Commander John Pullin, she captured the 14-gun cutter Abeille some 16 or 17 leagues off The Lizard. Abeille was three days out of Brest and had not taken anything. The Royal Navy took her into service under her existing name.

Earlier, Dryad had taken a large smuggling cutter, which was carrying a cargo of spirits, and sent her to Plymouth. Diana, Seahorse, Unicorn and the hired armed cutter Fox shared in the capture.

On 13 June Dryad captured the French frigate Proserpine after a 45-minute action 12 leagues off Cape Clear Island. William James wrote in his Naval History of Great Britain:

On the 13th of June, at 1 a.m., Cape Clear bearing west by north distant 12 leagues, the British 18-pounder 36-gun frigate Dryad, Captain Lord Amelius Beauclerk, standing close hauled on the starboard tack, with the wind a fresh breeze from northwest by west, discovered a sail in the south-west by west, or right ahead, standing towards her; but which, on nearing the Dryad, hauled her wind, and then tacked. This was the French frigate Proserpine, in search of her consorts, and who, now that she had discovered the ship approaching to be an enemy, was endeavoring to effect her escape.

Chase was immediately given by the Dryad, both ships on a wind upon the starboard tack. At 8 p.m. the Proserpine hoisted her colours; and immediately afterwards the Dryad did the same. The Proserpine then fired her stern-chasers, several of the shot from which went through the Dryad's sails and cut away her rigging. At 9 p.m., having reached her opponent's lee or larboard quarter, the Dryad commenced a close action, and maintained it with so much spirit and effect that, at 9 h. 45 m. p.m., the Proserpine hauled down the French ensign ... Were it not for the slight preponderance occasioned by the Dryad's carronades, the British frigate would have been inferior in guns, as well as in crew and size, to the French frigate. But, as what little the latter wanted in broadside weight of metal was amply made up to her in number of men, the action of the Dryad and Proserpine may be pronounced at least an equal match. Captain Pevrieux appears to have thought otherwise. Hence, the Proserpine fled, and by flying, not only sustained a very serious loss, but was unable to bring guns enough to bear upon her antagonist, to do any more injury to her than a single shot has often inflicted.

Had the French captain, instead of trying to escape, brought his frigate to, he might have manoeuvred her to some advantage, and even, if eventually compelled to yield, would have surrendered without discredit. As it was, after capturing the Proserpine, the Dryad, owing solely to her opponent's forbearance, was able to fight another frigate of the same force; and, could he have secured his prisoners without diminishing his crew, the Dryad's captain would no doubt have rejoiced at such an opportunity. Lord Amelius, in his official letter, speaks highly of his first lieutenant, Mr. Edward Durnford King, and the latter, most deservedly, was promoted to the rank of commander.

Proserpine suffered 30 were killed and 45 wounded out of her complement of 348 men, while Dryad lost two killed and seven wounded. The Royal Navy already had a Proserpine, and so the Admiralty renamed Proserpine Amelia in bringing her into the service. In 1847 the Admiralty issued the Naval General Service Medal with clasp "Dryad 13 June 1796" to the five surviving claimants from her crew who had participated in the action.

Dryad and Beauclerk followed this with the capture or destruction of five more French privateers. On 16 October she captured the French privateer Vantour after a six-hour chase. Vautour was armed with seven 4-pounder guns and two 12-pounder carronades. She was of 130 tons burthen, with a crew of 78 men. She had sailed from Morlaiz on 13 October and not taken anything.

The next year, on 19 August 1797, Dryad captured the French privateer Éclair. Éclair was armed with ten 4-pounder and four 8-pounder guns. She had a crew of 108 men and had sailed from L'Orient on 11 August, and had not taken anything.

Then on 9 September Dryad sank the 12-gun French privateer Cornélie. The brig caught fire but because of the state of the seas, Dryad was only able to save some 17 men of her crew of 90 or so men. Cornelie was 16 days out of Nantes and had only captured one ship, a Dane.

On 10 October Doris and Dryad captured the French privateer ship Brune after a chase of 40 leagues. She was armed with 16 guns and had a crew of 180 men. Brune was out of Bordeaux and had taken two British ships: on 17 September the brig Industry, which had been sailing from Newfoundland to Lisbon, and on 9 October the brig Commerce, which had been sailing in ballast from Greenock to Oporto.

Lastly, on 4 February 1798 Dryad captured the 16-gun privateer Mars 20 leagues off Cape Clear. Mars was pierced for 20 guns but carried twelve 12-pounders, two 18-pounders, and two 12-pounder carronades. She also had a crew of 222 men. She was 49 days out of Nantes but had not captured anything.

=== Irish Station and Captain Mansfield (1799–1801) ===
Captain Charles Mansfield, Commanding Officer of HMS Dryad from December 1798 to June 1802

In December 1798 Captain Charles John Moore Mansfield was appointed in command. According to the memoirs of one of his midshipmen, Mansfield's wife and two unruly children were living onboard Dryad at Portsmouth, his wife dressing in her own version of a naval officer's uniform. She was apparently well liked, despite her eccentric dress, since she did not interfere with the ship's business.

On 7 July 1799, Dryad was in company with the 44-gun frigate Révolutionnaire and Diamond when Revolutionaire captured the French privateer Determiné. The same three British ships also captured the French brig Hyppolite.

Dryad sailed for Cork, escorting a convoy. Several of the vessels picked up convicts and political prisoners at Cork for transport to Australia. Dryad escorted Friendship and Minerva well into the Atlantic, but then left them on 14 September. On 19 September 1799, she and Revolutionnaire captured the Cères, a French letter of marque en route from Bordeaux to the Caribbean. Also, at some point Dryad recaptured the British ship Albion. Albion had been sailing from Jamaica with a cargo of rum and sugar when the French privateer Brieve captured her.

The Times reported on 6 January 1800 that

The Dryad frigate, Captain MANSFIELD, sailed from Cork on the 4th of December, with the following transports ... it is supposed that these troops are destined to replace the garrison of Minorca, the principle part of which are employed in the reduction of MALTA.

Dryad was based at Cork for several months during 1800, in Admiral Lord Gardner's fleet; Gardner's son Valentine commenced his naval career in Dryad under Mansfield. At the beginning of April 1800, Dryad spent several days assisting Revolutionnaire, which had lost her rudder in a hurricane in the Atlantic. Dryad had lost her fore-yard and the two ships assisted each other towards Cork when an off-shore gale forced them to head for Plymouth. However, another change in the wind meant that they could neither weather the Scilly Isles nor return to Cork and they drifted up the St George's Channel. On 16 April Dryad tried to tow Revolutionnaire off the Waterford rocks, but the cable broke. Fortunately another change of wind enabled Revolutionnaire to avoid the rocks and both ships finally arrived at Milford Haven on 19 April in a "most distressed state".

=== Capture of Premier Consul and Ulla Fersen ===
West of Ireland on 5 March 1801 Dryad captured the French privateer Premier Consul of St Malo after a 3-hour chase. Premier Consul was pierced for 24 guns but was armed with fourteen 9-pounders. She had a crew of 150 men. She was 21 days out of Saint Malo and had captured a Portuguese schooner sailing from Lisbon to Ireland.

The Portsmouth Telegraph reported on 16 March 1801:

By a private letter received from Cork, we learn, that the Dryad frigate, Captain Mansfield, has captured and sent into that port, a Swedish frigate, after an action of ten minutes, in which the Swede had 7 killed and 14 wounded.

The Swedish frigate was HSwMS Ulla Fersen, of 18 guns. Dryad returned from the Irish Station to Portsmouth on 18 March with both Premier Consul and Ulla Fersen as prizes. The Admiralty took Premier Consul into service as HMS Scout, but she foundered within a year with the loss of her entire crew. The British returned Ulla Fersen to the Swedes after negotiations.

=== Peace of Amiens (1802–1803) ===
After the United Kingdom signed the Treaty of Amiens with the French Republic in March 1802, Mansfield arrived back in Portsmouth on 9 June in Dryad carrying Admiral Lord Gardner and bearing his flag. Captain Robert Williams was appointed to Dryad, joining her almost immediately. Dryad cruised off Portland suppressing smuggling. In February 1803 Williams left to become captain of the third rate 74-gun Russell. War with France broke out again in May 1803.

== Napoleonic Wars ==
On 28 July 1803, Dryad, under Captain John Giffard, recaptured Adventure.

=== Return to the Irish Station (1804–1808) ===
Dryad had the honour of returning Admiral Lord Gardner to his command at Cork in 1804. She remained on the Irish Station, but at the end of the year Captain Giffard left the ship due to ill health. His replacement, in January 1805, was Captain (later Admiral Sir) Adam Drummond. On 2 November off Ferrol Dryad, in company with Boadicea, encountered four French ships-of-the-line under Rear-Admiral Pierre Dumanoir le Pelley that had escaped from the Battle of Trafalgar. Dryad and Boadicea tried to entice the French into the path of a Royal Navy squadron. Although Dryad and Boadicea lost the French ships of the line, a squadron under the command of Sir Richard Strachan had seen the rocket signals the frigates had launched. In the subsequent Battle of Cape Ortegal, the British captured Formidable, Scipion, Duguay-Trouin, and Mont Blanc. Unfortunately, having lost the French squadron, neither Boadicea nor Dryad shared in the benefits that their actions had made possible.

On 13 February 1805, Pallas captured Fortuna. Dryad submitted a claim to share in the prize money. On 22 February, Euryalus captured St Jose and Dryad shared in the prize by agreement with Euryalus.

In October or early November, as Harriot was returning from Port Jackson to London a Spanish privateer captured her, but Dryad recaptured her and sent her into Waterford.

On 15 May 1807, Dryad was under the command of Captain Adam Drummond and in company with Amethyst and Plover. The three vessels were some twenty leagues off Scilly when Amethyst spotted and captured a strange sail. The captured vessel turned out to be the French privateer schooner Josephine. Josephine was armed with four 2-pounder guns and had a crew of 45 men, ten of whom she had put on board Jane, which had been sailing from Lisbon when Josephine captured her. Josephine had sailed from the Ile de Batz on 2 April.

In July 1807 Captain William Price Cumby took pro tempore command of Dryad, and during a three-month cruise on the Irish Station took several valuable prizes. Captain Drummond returned to the ship, and on 22 March 1808 he captured the French privateer Rennair (or Rennois). She was pierced for 18 guns but only mounted twelve 6-pounders and two 12-pounder carronades. She had a crew of 95 men, half of whom were Danes. She was a new vessel, 12 days into her first cruise, with provisions and stores for three months. When Rennair was captured she had taken only one prize, a Portuguese schooner carrying a cargo of salt for Cork.

Then on 4 September, Dryad and Virginie captured the Danish brig Inge Berg Maria.

Next, on 18 September 1807, Dryad, in company with Viginie, captured Jomsrue Ellen, Jensin, master. Then on 27 September 1807 Dryad captured Nimrod, H. Nicholayson, master. (The Royal Navy took her into service as HMS Netley.) On 22 September, Dryad captured the Danish ship Carl. Four days later Dryad captured Garde Haab.

Lastly, on 15 November 1808, Dryad captured the Unie.

=== Walcheren Expedition (1809) ===
Captain Edward Galwey took command in 1809, and remained captain of Dryad until the end of the Napoleonic Wars. On 28 July Dryad sailed with a large fleet from the Downs. This fleet, and the troops they carried, formed part of the Walcheren Expedition, the aim of which was to demolish the dockyards and arsenals at Antwerp, Terneuzen, and Flushing.

On 11 August Dryad formed part of a squadron of frigates directed to sound and buoy the Sloe Strait in preparation for the attack on Flushing, which fell on 15 August. In forcing the West Scheld, the British ships were under fire from shore batteries for two hours, during which time they suffered two men killed and nine wounded; Dryad had no casualties. Prize money was paid in 1812. The expedition ended in failure, mostly due to malaria decimating the expeditionary force, which withdrew by September.

=== Home Station (1809–1814) ===
Between 1809 and 1814 Dryad served on the Home Station, including the north coast of Spain under the orders of Commodore Sir Robert Mends. On 6 February 1810 she and Eclipse recaptured Dobridge and Hercules.

In late June and early July Dryad was part of a British squadron that destroyed all the French batteries (except for Castro) on the Spanish coast from St. Sebastian (a fortified town in the Basque province of Gipuzkoa at the bottom of the Bay of Biscay) to St. Andero. Landing parties destroyed one hundred heavy guns and essentially denuded that coast of its defences, all without suffering any casualties. On 31 October, Dryad recaptured Americana. The French privateer Charles had captured Americana, Fousica, master, on 26 October as Americana was sailing from Bahia to London. After Dryad recaptured Americana, Americana then arrived at Plymouth on 9 November. (Note: Lloyd's Register described Americana as teak-built, of 283 tons, and from the Brazils. It gave her trade as London-Brazil.)

The year 1811 was busy. Dryad's list of prizes includes:

- American ship Matilda (28 January; in sight of Indefatigable and Lyra);
- American schooner Two Sisters, with a cargo of fish;
- Post Boy (17 March);
- French schooner La Balam (22 March);
- the recapture of Nancy (14 April); (Note: A commissioned officer's share of the salvage money for Nancy was £16 1s 5 1/2d; an able seaman's share was 16s 10 3/4d. For an able seaman this would represent about two weeks' wages.)
- chasse marees St. Jean, St. Francois, and Louise (10 and 12 July);
- chasse marees Deux Amis, Marie, and Jean Baptiste (5 September; Dryad sharing with four other vessels); and
- an unnamed French brig (9 October).

Dryad docked in Plymouth during October. However, by January 1812 she was again sending prizes in:

- Spy from New York (27 January);
- Prudentia (31 January);
- Don Roderick (16 February); and
- Purse (29 May).

On 15 May Dryad and Armide captured the French schooner Hirondelle.

On 26 May 1812, Belle Poule, Abercrombie and Dryad shared in the capture of General Gates. Armide also shared by agreement.

Dryad was employed on less glamorous tasks as well - during August 1812 she conveyed bullocks to the Channel Fleet, a filthy and unpleasant mission. On 23 December 1812 Captain Galway drove a French brig of 22 guns ashore on the Île d'Yeu, which wrecked her. Dryad took several hits in her hull and foremast from shots fired by shore batteries but suffered no casualties.

On 6 January 1813, Dryad captured the American schooner Rossie from Baltimore, which arrived in Plymouth on 17 January 1813. (Note: In an earlier cruise as a privateer, Rossie had captured 20 British ships, including the Post Office Packet Service packet ship Princess Amelia, after a sharp fight.) Eight ships of the Royal Navy were in sight, as was Chance. Then six days later, Dryad was among the 11 vessels that shared in the recapture of the schooner Industry. The next day, Dryad captured the American ship Porcupine, of 330 tons burthen. Porcupine was armed with four guns and carried a crew of 13 men. She was sailing from New York to Bordeaux with a cargo of cotton and potash. The privateer Chance was again in sight and so again shared in the prize money.

=== Capture of Clorinde (1814) ===
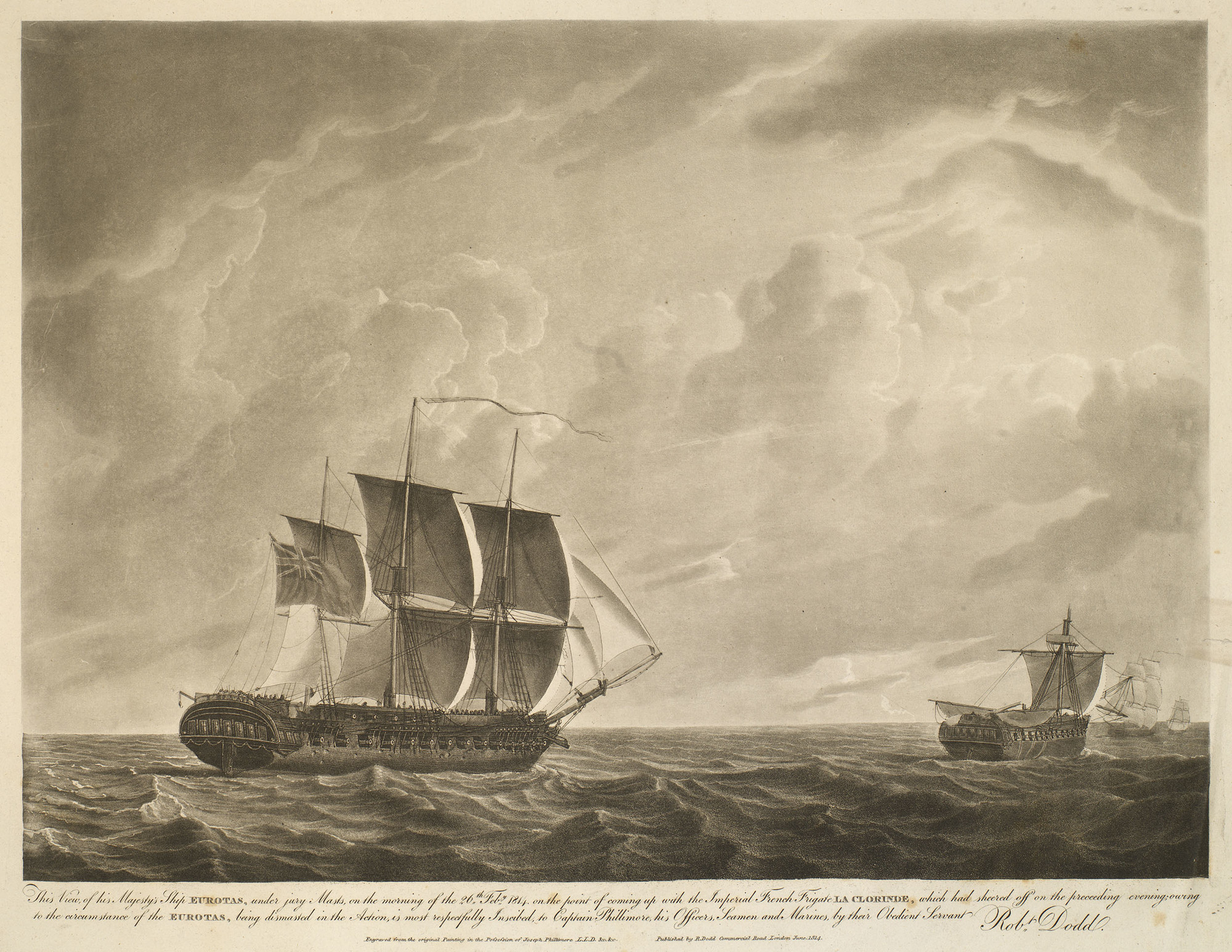
Capture of La Clorinde, by Robert Dodd, 1 March 1817, Dryad second left in the picture

While returning from Newfoundland in company with the 16-gun brig-sloop Achates, on 26 February Dryad came across the damaged French frigate Clorinde, which had attempted to escape Eurotas after a hard-fought battle the previous day. Eurotas had twenty men and officers killed and forty wounded; the French estimated their losses at 120 men. Captain John Phillimore of Eurotas was among those listed as severely wounded. Clorinde was under the command of Captain Dennis Legard, mounted forty-four guns and four brass swivel guns in each top, and had had a crew of 360 men.

In his letter of report, Phillimore observed that the approach of Dryad and Achates was "to the great mortification of every one on board", because Eurotas had spent all night setting up a jury-rig, and the Prize Rules meant that all ships in sight shared in the prize money. After a single cannon shot, Clorinde surrendered to Dryad, which towed her into Portsmouth. The Royal Navy took Clorinde into service as Aurora. (Note: Prize money was paid in January 1815, with the value of a first-class share, such as would accrue to a captain, being £671 6d; the value of a sixth-class share, i.e., that of an ordinary seaman, was £7 9s 5 1/4d. A first-class share of the head money was worth £182 12s 9 1/4d; a sixth-class share was worth £1 1s 2 1/4d. Had Dryad and Achates not arrived, Philmore's first-class share alone would have been worth two to three times as much.)

== Post-war ==
Dryad was decommissioned on her return with Clorinde, and although in 1816 she was fitted for a voyage to Jamaica, the plan was canceled. She remained out of commission at Sheerness until 1825.

=== Mediterranean (1825–1830) ===
Dryad was recommissioned in August 1825 under Captain Hon. Robert Rodney (4th son of George Rodney, 2nd Baron Rodney) at Sheerness for service in the Mediterranean. Less than a year later, on 20 July 1826, Rodney died while in command of the frigate. His successor was Captain The Hon. George Crofton (son of Sir Edward Crofton, 2nd Baronet). The ship visited Gibraltar, Valletta and Aegina between July 1827 and June 1828.

=== Preventative Squadron (1830–1832) ===
By November 1829 Dryad was recommissioning in Plymouth for foreign service. Captain John Hayes joined her in May 1830 and she sailed for the coast of Africa on 29 September 1830, with Captain Hayes serving as commodore on that station, a station with a well-deserved reputation for killing sailors by disease. Fair Rosamond and Black Joke, both captured ex-slave ships, were tenders to Dryad, and between November 1830 and March 1832, they accounted for 11 out of the 13 slavers the squadron captured. Despite the hardships, the West Africa Squadron carried out a determined effort to stop the slave trade, a task that increasing international co-operation gradually more effective.

Dryad's visits to Ascension Island brought welcome relief to the crew from the torrid climate of West Africa, as well as fresh provisions and time ashore for recreation. It also gave them time to water, refit and paint her. Dryad carried out hydrography, too. In 1832 The Nautical Magazine recorded one such occasion:

On the authority of Commodore Hayes, and Mr. A. Weir, the master of H.M.S. Dryad, we can no longer give credit to the statement of Mr. Fraser, of the ship St. George, in 1830, relating to the existence of a dangerous rock to N.E. of Ascension. By the following it will be seen, that the Dryad and her tender went in search of it; and from the care taken in the observations, as well as the common occurrence of shoals of fish being frequently seen in those latitudes, and the great probability that it would have been discovered before, had such a rock existed, we must conclude that there is no such danger.

On 21 or 22 February 1831 Black Joke captured a slaver with 300 slaves on board. This was probably the Spanish schooner Primeira. At the time Black Joke was acting as a tender to Dryad. (Note: A first-class share, which would have accrued to the captain of Dryad, was worth £369 2s 6d; a sixth-class share was worth £1 3s 6 3/4d.) On 20 April, Black Joke captured the Marinerito. (Note: A first-class share was worth £533 8s 9d; a sixth-class share was worth £1 18s 6 3/4d.) On 19 July, Fair Rosamond captured the Spanish slave schooner Potosi. (Note: A first-class share was worth £215 9s 3d; a sixth-class share was worth 15s 6 1/2d.) On 10 September Fair Rosamond and Black Joke captured the Spanish slave vessels Regulo and Rapido. (Note: A first-class share was worth £383 8s 1d; a sixth-class share was worth £1 8s 6d. Later it was discovered that nine men had been left off the prize list for the capture of all three vessels and the holders of sixth-class shares were obliged to return 1s 0 3/4d for distribution to these men. However, a prize court reinstated a half-bounty for 29 slaves who had died prior to the Regulo's condemnation. A captain's share was £13 10s, a commander's share was £6 5s, and a sixth-class share was 11 1/2d.)

On 15 February 1832, Black Joke captured Spanish schooner Frasquita, alias Centilla. This vessel too yielded bounty money for the slaves on board her. (Note: A first-class share was worth £303 3s 6d; a sixth-class share was worth £1 1s 9 3/4d.)

Dryad's voyage home started in The Gambia on 31 May 1832, and after a short stop in the Azores at the beginning of July, she arrived in Portsmouth on 25 July. On 11 August she sailed for Cork, Ireland, and returned to Portsmouth on 29 August.

== Fate ==
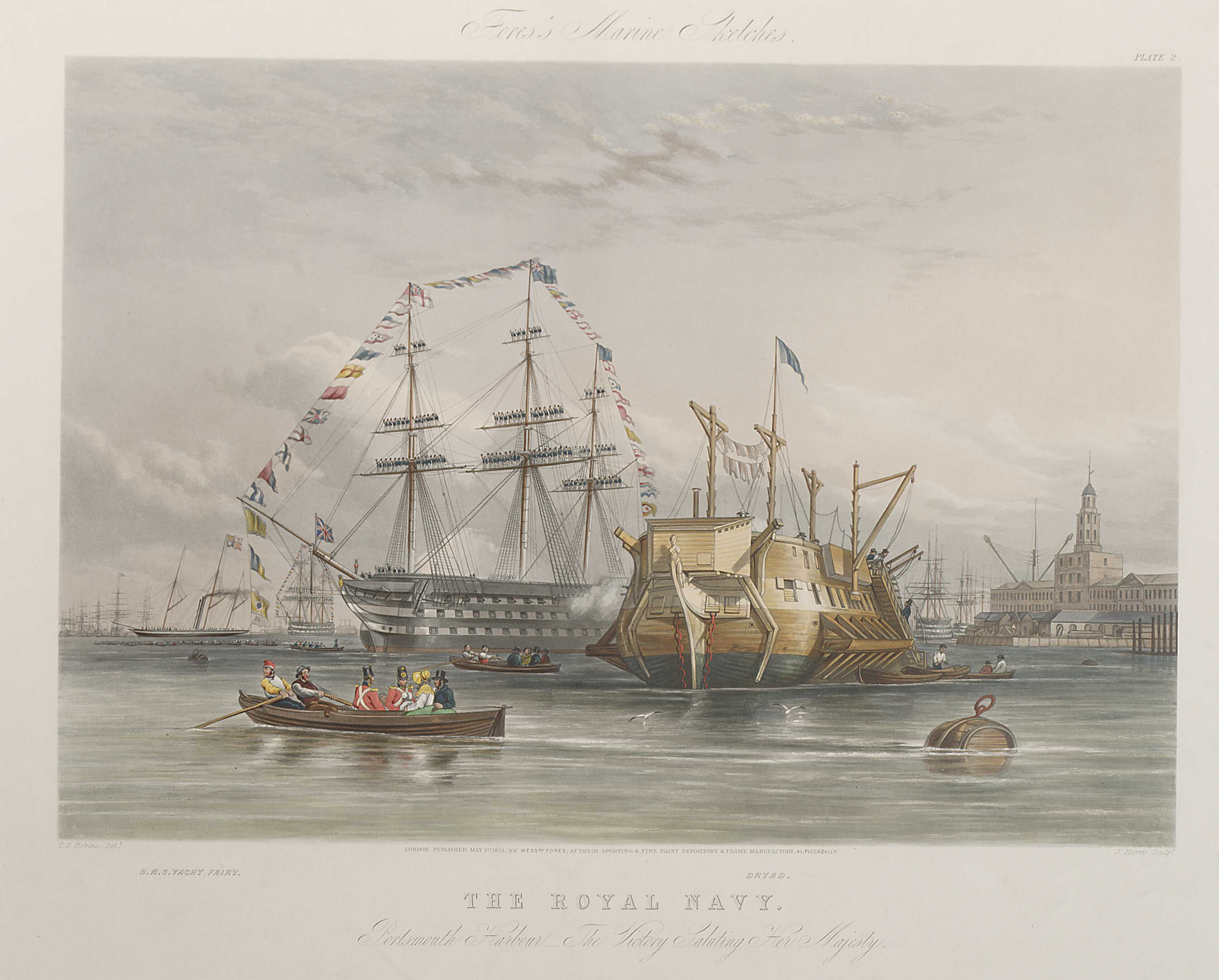
Portsmouth Harbour 1851, the Dryad hulk in the foreground

Dryad was taken out of commission for the last time on 13 September 1832 and she then became a receiving ship at Portsmouth. She was broken up in 1862.

== Commanding officers ==
From	To	Captain
June 1795	7 October 1795	Captain Hon. Robert Forbes, drowned off Norway in command on 7 October 1795
December 1795	December 1798	Captain Lord Amelius Beauclerk
February 1799	June 1802	Captain Charles John Moore Mansfield
May 1803	February 1804	Captain Robert Williams
1804	1804	Captain John Giffard
1804	1809	Captain Adam Drummond
July 1807	1808	Captain William Price Cumby, pro tempore command
1809	1814	Captain Edward Galway
1814	1825	Out of commission
August 1825	20 July 1826	Captain The Hon. Robert Rodney, died in command on 20 July 1826
24 July 1826	1830	Captain The Hon. George Alfred Crofton
May 1830	13 September 1832	Captain John Hayes
