= Élie de Vassoigne =

Élie, Jean de Vassoigne
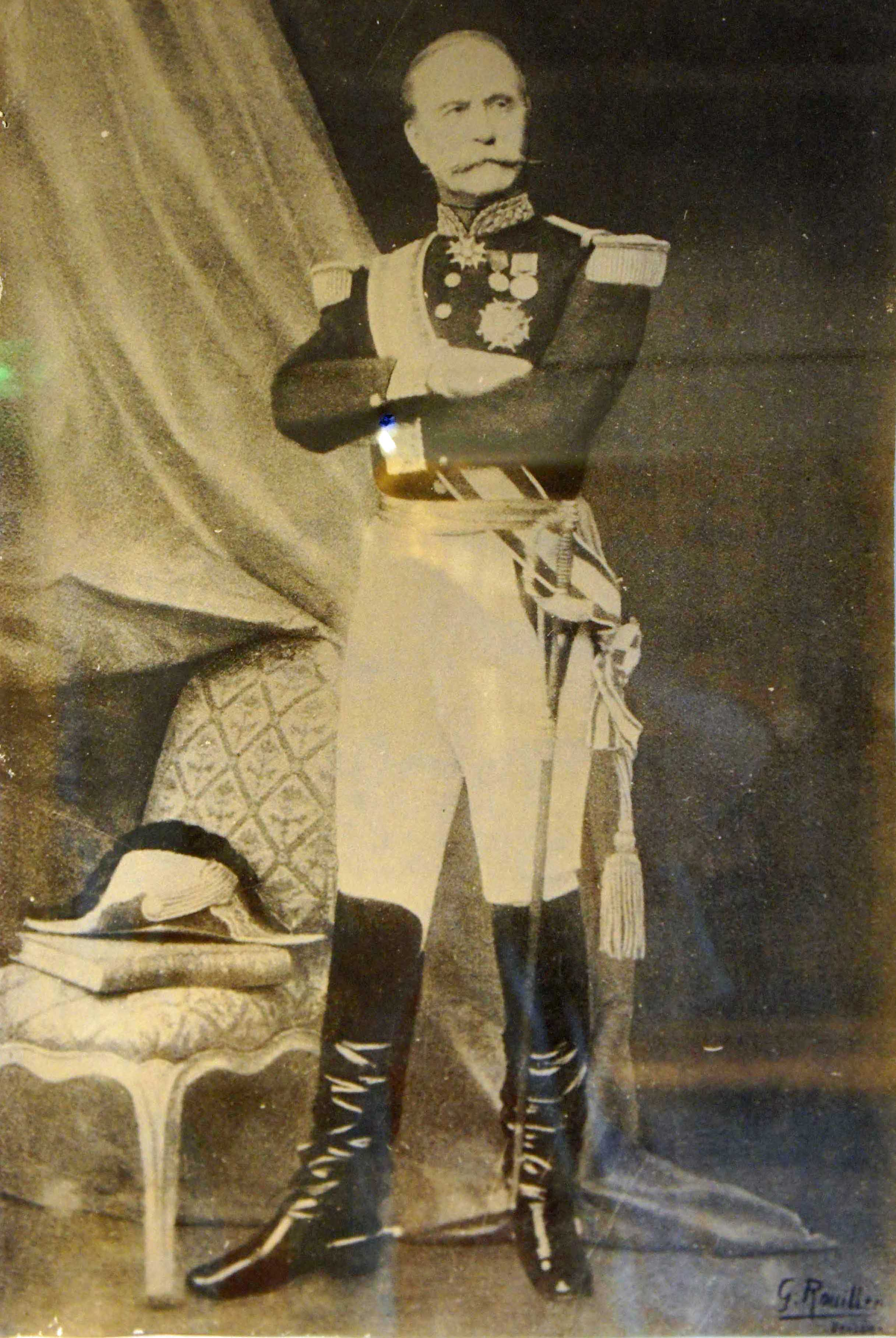
- Born: May 27, 1811; Rivière-Salée, Martinique, French Empire
- Died: October 3, 1891 (aged 80); Paris, French Republic
- Military career
- Allegiance: French Empire; French Republic
- Service years: 1854–1880
- Conflicts: Crimean War: Battle of Bomarsund; Second Opium War: Third Battle of Taku Forts; Chochinchina Campaign: Siege of Tourane; Battle of Ky Hoa; Franco-Prussian War: Battle of Bazeilles; Battle of Sedan

Élie, Jean de Vassoigne (French pronunciation: [eli də vaswaɲ]; 1811–1891) was a French general who distinguished himself in the Baltic in 1854 against the Russians in the Battle of Bomarsund, then commanded from 1854 to 1856 the occupation corps of Greece during the Crimean War. Then in 1859 and 1860, he went to campaign in China commanding the 3e régiment de Marine brigade of General Collineau. He was then sent to Tonkin and Annam in Cochinchina from 1860 to 1861. On February 27, 1861, during the Battle of Ky Hoa, he was seriously injured by an arrow. In 1870, he took part in the Battle of Sedan, during the Franco-Prussian War.

== Biography ==
Élie Jean de Vassoigne was the son of Élie Auguste Vassoigne and Marie Anne Joséphine Aubert de La Baume. He was born on May 27, 1811, in Rivière Salée, which was a locality of Martinique. His military record in the Service historique de défense à Vincennes leaves little room for his colonial youth. After high school, he left his native island and entered the École spéciale militaire de Saint-Cyr on November 11, 1827. His class was made up of 179 students.

He was promoted to second lieutenant on 1 October 1829. He was assigned to the 45th Infantry Regiment. When the Troupes de la Marine was reorganized (under Louis Philippe I), he volunteered for this military branch. Thus, from 1830 to 1853, he stayed in the colonies of Martinique and Guadeloupe where he married Louise Vernias, daughter of the former mayor of the municipality of Abymes, on May 10, 1841.

=== Crimean War ===
In 1854, he joined the metropolis. Placed under the command of Rear-Admiral Marc-Antoine Parseval, he took command of part of the Franco-English expeditionary force that would ensure victory over the Russians in the Baltic Sea. His group consisted of 400 sailors, 500 marines belonging to the 1st and 2nd Marching Regiments of the Marine Infantry (which the 1st, 2nd and 21st RIMa would inherit) and a battalion of 180 fusiliers of the British Royal Navy. He left Brest on April 20, 1854, the squadron arrived in the Baltic Sea on 22 June. Then began a long march on three columns for the 2,500 men of the Expeditionary Force towards Kronstadt. On August 13, 1854, when Admiral Perseval receives the surrender of Russian General Nikolai Bodisko, de Vassoigne, at the head of his men, heroically charges and obtains the surrender of the Presto Island's tower after several hours of fierce fighting. The tower was armed with 17 cannons and protected by more than 250 enemy soldiers, gunners, and 158 prisoners.

On August 12, 1854, he was made an officer of the legion; he would receive the English Baltic Medal in November 1856 (see the section below). Distinguished by his leaders, he obtained the superior command of the occupation body in Greece, which he exercised from November 1854 to 1856 (Military file). He was the head of nine companies of the 1st and 2nd Marine Infantry Regiments.

On September 22, 1856, he was appointed colonel and took command of the 3rd Marine Infantry Regiment (1856/1859) in Rochefort.

In November 1856, Colonel de Vassoigne was awarded the British Baltic Medal (decree of October 25, 1856).

=== Asia ===
On December 30, 1858, he was made Commander of the Legion of Honour and took part in the Second Opium War. In 1859, on the orders of General Cousin-Montauban, he studied all the possibilities of the Battle of Taku Forts with General Collineau and Vice-Admiral Protet. During these fights, he placed himself at the head of an attack column and distinguished himself by entering one of the forts from which enemy soldiers were trying to retreat. He took a large number of prisoners and recovered more than 3,000 weapons, including cannons. On this occasion, he was mentioned on the agenda by General Cousin-Montauban, commander-in-chief of the French expeditionary force, "For his good behavior during the attack and the capture of the Taku Forts" (August 21, 1860).

On November 7, 1860, he was promoted to brigadier general. He was sent to Tonkin, and with the 3rd Marine Infantry Regiment, he encountered extreme Vietnamese resistance during the Siege of Tourane and lost the battle. Though he lost the battle, he was noticed by his superiors for his bravery and the example he sets for his porpoises. In mid-February 1861, he received a mission to prepare the ground attack of the lines of Ki-Hoa. There, he inspected, studied and recognized the positions of the adversary. On February 24, 1861, during the attack on the Fort des Mandarins (fort of the Ki-Hoa line), when he gave the charge to the head of one of his elements, he was seriously injured by a Biscaian who pierced his arm left and wounded him deeply in the side puncturing his lung. Vice-admiral Charner, commander-in-chief of the Naval Division of the Seas of China and responsible for the Cochinchina expeditionary force, which was present at his side during the fighting, had him summoned to the Order of the Army for "his exceptional conduct. during the attack on the lines and forts of Ki-Hoa". On this occasion, he was decorated by order of Her Majesty the Queen of Spain Isabella II, with the Grand Cross of Isabelle the Catholic.

On his return from French Cochinchina, he was appointed Deputy Inspector General of the Marine and Colonial Infantry. He joined the capital, and he stayed in Etretat where he meets Anaïs Anicet-Bourgeois, daughter of Auguste Anicet-Bourgeois, who was widowed, for a few years now. He was seduced by her for her appearance and would marry her in February 1866.

The general moved to Etretat, where he acquired the villa of the Comte de Montault by dowry in 1866. This property bears as its name on the regional cadastre the villa of Vafsoigne (in old French), as the Marquis wrote his name before the Empire. To say that he was assiduous in this village is not an empty word since, in 1866, he donated a stained glass window to Abbé Monville (parish priest of Etretat) for the Notre Dame church. On this thin glass roof that is still eligible to this day: "Gift of the General and the Marquise de Vassoigne née Anicet-Bourgeois – 1866" (stained glass visible in the church of Etretat).

In 1868, during the reorganization of Troupes de la Marine, special corps, battalions of apprentice sailors and riflemen and schools of Troop Children, he was appointed Inspector General Chief of Staff of the Army. He leads this reorganization with his assistants: Generals Reboul and Martin des Pallières which relates to the strength of the forces and their new distributions; regulations related to the Weapon, campaigns, and stays in the Colonial Empire, the composition of the regiments (four Infantry and one Artillery) with Engineer units, echelon support and crew trains as well as the design of a new outfit for France and the colonies of the Second French Empire.

On December 23, 1868, he was appointed general of division Inspector General of the Troops of the Navy and the Colonies. From 1869, he carried out numerous inspections: in Senegal, Cayenne, Île Bourbon, Pondicherry, Cochinchina, New Caledonia.

=== Franco-Prussian War ===
In June 1870, he was raised in the dignity of Grand Officer of the Legion of Honor. In July 1870, during the Franco-Prussian crisis, Rigault de la Genouilly, Minister of the Navy and the Colonies, instructed him to form a Navy division at the head of which with his deputy Generals Reboul and Martin des Pallières he would illustrate this weapon in the Battle of Bazeilles.

In September 1870, the Battle of Sedan's poorly explained situation would push him away to continue his prestigious fighting. Yet his division would be illustrated in honour and abnegation towards and against the despair of defeat. On September 2, 1870, when the Emperor's order fell of: "We must stop the fighting!" General de Vassoigne surrendered to his adversary. He was opposed to any officer, non-commissioned officer, Porpoise or Bigor of his division signing a surrender swearing on the honour not to resume the fight against the German States in exchange for their immediate release. Taken prisoner, he was brought to Dresden, Saxony.

=== Later life ===
In March 1871, after the Treaties of Versailles and Belfort, he was released and went to Pau where he fell seriously ill. After that, however, he wrote to his supervising minister to resume service. He would later join the Inspection.

On May 24, 1873, when Adolphe Thiers resigned, General de Vassoigne was reappointed as Inspector General of Marine Troops and Colonies by Marshal Mac-Mahon who became President of the Republic.

He also finds himself proposed by the Duke of Broglie, head of the government of the Moral Order, for the function of Governor of Cochinchina. For family and personal reasons, he declined this promotion. Having never really left the Inspectorate, he asked for his retirement on May 1, 1877, and is admitted as part of the reserve, and on February 20, 1880, he obtains his definitive retirement rights.

Every spring and summer that followed, he spent them in Etretat, which he had loved since 1862. He introduced this town to several Parisian friends, particularly his elders, the major generals Hubert Lyautey and Mangin and to Vice-admiral Dupetit- Thouars. He died on October 3, 1891, in Paris.

In the funeral eulogy which he pronounces during the funeral of General de Vassoigne, the general physician of the Marine, Béranger-Féraud recounts:

In September 1870, when the Bavarians took me, prisoner, I was directed towards General Hartmann who, at the sight of my sailor's uniform, took me for an aide-de-camp to General de Vassoigne. He called out to me to say, "Tell your general that his Marines fought like lions!" Bazeilles! This name resonated that day and summed up this full life by virtue of the Duty that he had accomplished and, which each year the Regiments of the Marine Troops honour, in Fréjus, in Bazeilles and their garrisons.

In 1898, seven years after the death of General de Vassoigne, Nestor Thurin, Martin Arthur Vatinel and Evode Barrey, municipal councillors and veterans of 1870 launched a subscription for the erection of a monument commemorating this war. Prosperer Brindejont, mayor of the village, gave the eastern corner of the cemetery to build this monument. While waiting for the acceptance of the prefecture, the village's veterans created a committee of creation of the commemorative monument of Etretat.

== Honours ==
- Grand Officer of the Legion of Honour
- Crimea Medal
- Commemorative medal of the 1860 China Expedition

=== Foreign awards ===
- Cambodia: Royal Order of Cambodia
- Spain: Order of Isabella the Catholic
