= HSwMS Ulla Fersen =

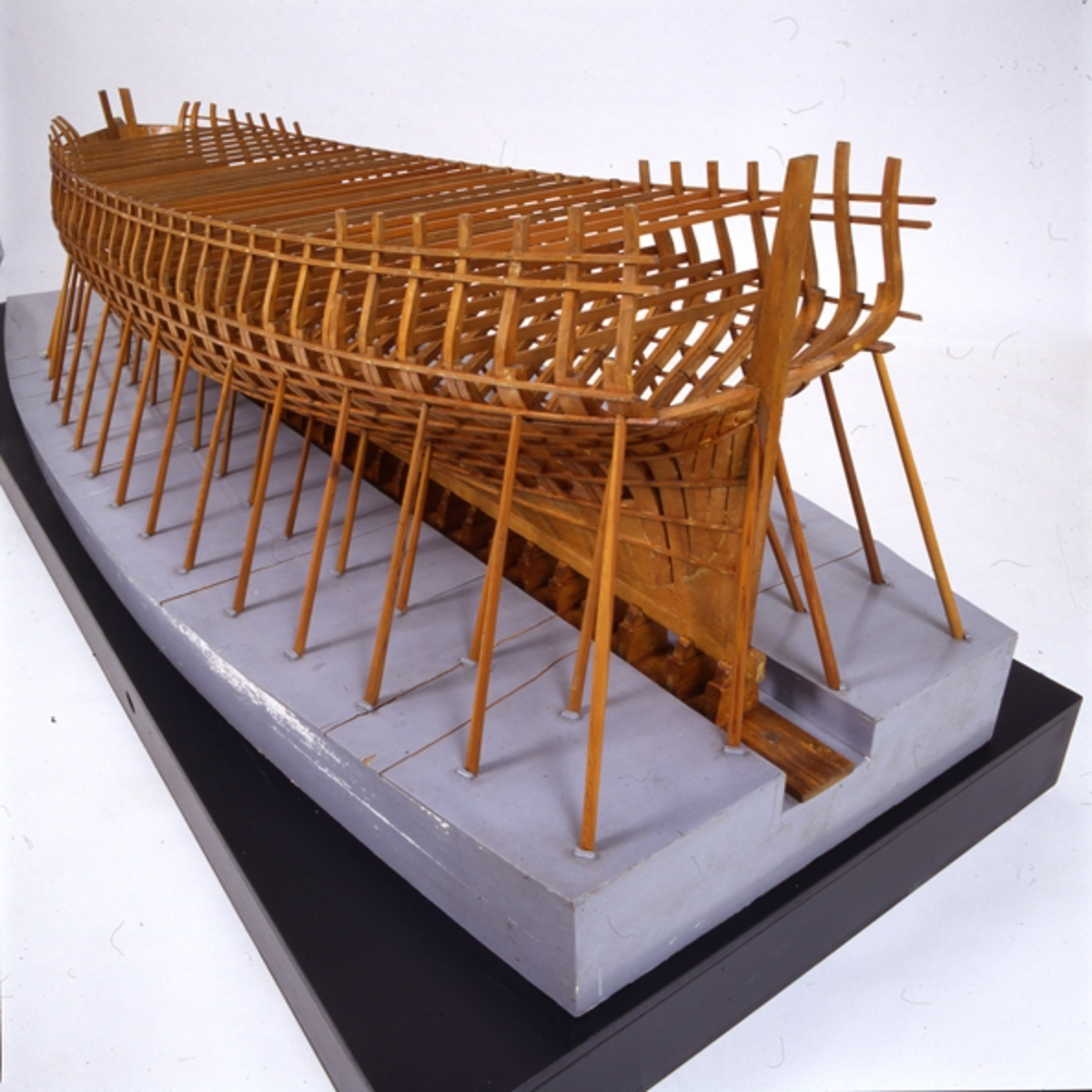
- Ship model of Ulla Fersen on the stocks

History

Sweden
- Name: Ulla Fersen
- Builder: Karlskrona naval shipyard
- Launched: 15 August 1789
- Captured: 1796 and 1801 (detained and released)
- Fate: Sank 20 April 1807
- Notes: Rebuilt 1802

General characteristics
- Length: 33.55 m (110 ft 1 in) (113 Swedish ft)
- Beam: 9.07 m (29 ft 9 in) (30 Swedish ft 6 Swedish in)
- Draft: 4.0 m (13 ft 1 in) (13 Swedish ft 6 Swedish in)
- Armament: 18 × Swedish 6-pounder cannon

HSwMS Ulla Fersen was an 18-gun frigate of the Swedish Navy. Designed by the shipwright Fredrik Henrik af Chapman, she was launched in 1789 and served in the Russo-Swedish War of 1788–1790, most notably at the Battle of Reval. British vessels twice detained her, once in 1798 and again in 1801, with the first event almost leading to the execution of her master, Swedish Navy officer Rudolf Cederström, by his own government. Ulla Fersen was completely rebuilt in 1802, and lost in a storm in 1807.

== Design and construction ==
Ulla Fersen was designed by the Swedish shipwright Fredrik Henrik af Chapman. In 1787, Chapman proposed the Swedish Navy adopt a ten-year plan which would involved constructing five ships of the line, six frigates, several storehouses and a naval hospital. Various issues prevented the plan from being fully implemented. Ulla Fersen was the final warship built under Chapman's plan, being launched on 15 August 1789 in Karlskrona. (Note: The Sjöhistoriska Museet (National Maritime Museum), Stockholm, has a structural model of Ulla Fersen.) Although the Swedish navy referred to her as either a frigate or light frigate, she more closely resembled contemporary French corvettes or British sloops-of-war in size and armament. Ulla Fersen was named after Ulla von Höpken, a Swedish noblewoman and courtier.

== Russo-Swedish War ==
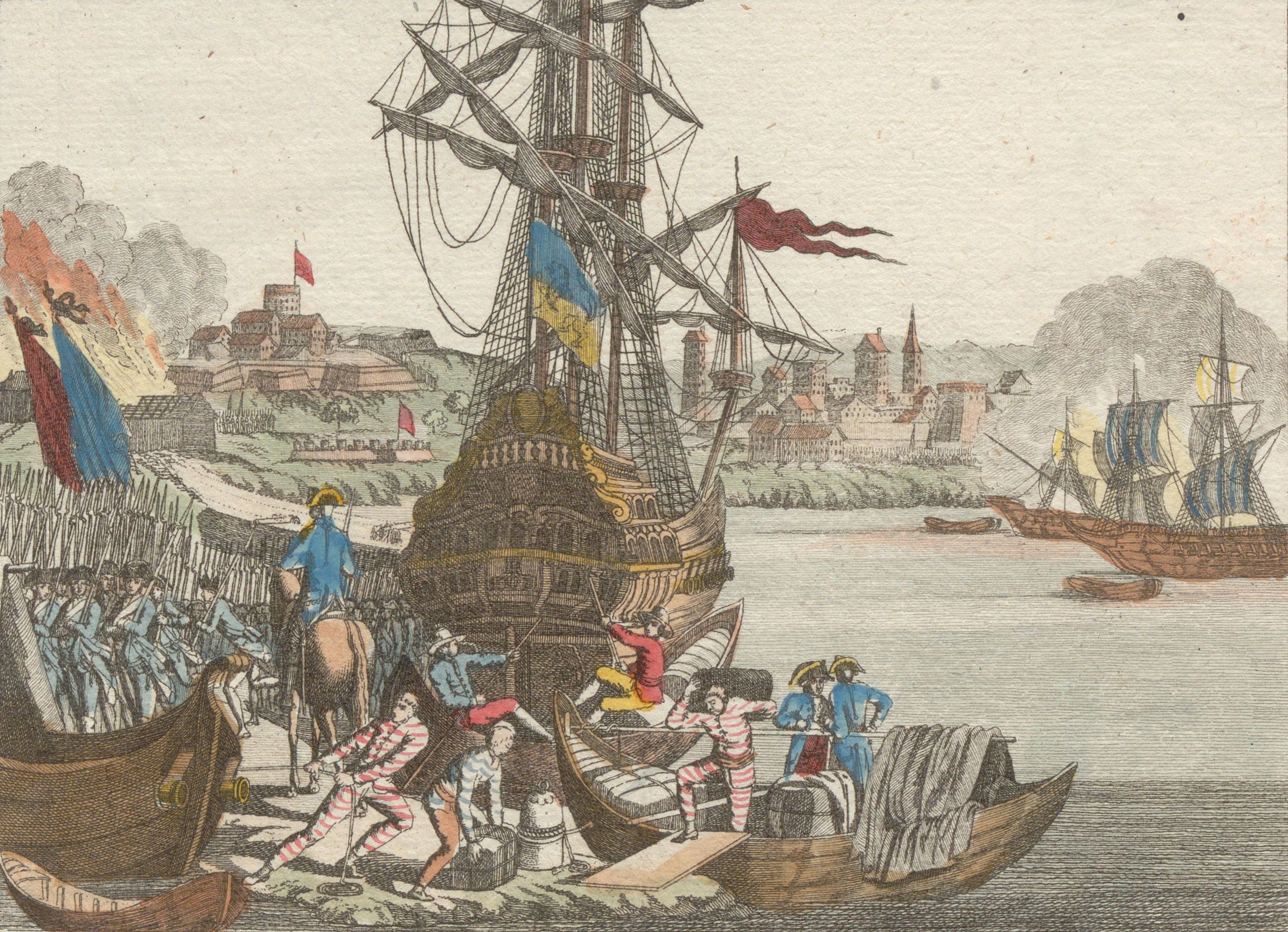
1790 illustration of the raid on Baltischport

In 1788, war broke out between Sweden and Russia. On 17 March 1790, Lieutenant Rudolf Cederström, commanding Ulla Fersen and the fellow frigate Jarramas, led a successful raid on Baltischport. The Swedes were under the mistaken impression that there was an Imperial Russian Navy squadron of between 10 and 12 ships at Baltischport, and aimed to attack it before the squadron could set sail. Though the supposed squadron was absent, Cederström formed a naval brigade and forced the surrender of a Russian fort before burning several local storehouses containing naval stores.

During the Battle of Reval, which took place on 13 May 1790 off the port of Reval, Ulla Fersen served as the flagship for General-Admiral Prince Karl, Duke of Södermanland, the brother of Gustav III. The Swedes were attempting to eliminate a Russian squadron under Admiral Vasily Chichagov, which had wintered in the harbour at Reval, though they were unsuccessful. Prince Karl signalled the Swedish fleet to withdraw from Ulla Fersen, which had stayed out of the range of Russian cannon fire.

== First British interception ==
In 1798, Ulla Fersen, under Cederström, escorted a convoy of Swedish merchantmen in the North Sea. On 7 August, he encountered two small Royal Navy warships, HMS Busy and HMS Speedwell. Busy's captain, John Ackworth Ommaney, hailed Ulla Fersen and asked where the convoy was going. Cederström replied that they were bound for the "Spanish Sea". Ommaney ordered the Swedes to permit boarding parties to inspect the merchantmen to determine if they were carrying cargo deemed by the British as contraband and for destinations under enemy control. Cederström initially refused, but then relented and permitted the convoy to go into the Downs for further inspection.

Sweden was neutral at the time and Cederström was under strict orders from Gustav IV Adolf not to permit foreign interference with Swedish-flagged ships escorted by Swedish warships and to resist such interference with force if necessary. However, Cederström, realising that he was outgunned, chose to avoid violence and did not resist. Busy was armed with sixteen 32-pounder carronades and two 6-pounder guns, and Speedwell with fourteen 4-pounder guns and twelve ½-pounder swivel guns. This gave the British a combined broadside in excess of 290 pounds, versus Ulla Ferson's eighteen 6-pounders, for a broadside of 54 pounds. Cederström was recalled to Sweden and tried for disobeying orders. He was found guilty and sentenced to death, and imprisoned for a while at a fortress, but pardoned just before he was due to be executed. He was eventually restored to his former position in the Swedish navy, going on to enjoy a distinguished career.

== Second British interception ==
The Portsmouth Telegraph reported on 16 March 1801:

By a private letter received from Cork, we learn, that the Dryad frigate, Captain Mansfield, has captured and sent into that port, a Swedish frigate, after an action of ten minutes, in which the Swede had 7 killed and 14 wounded.

The Swedish frigate was Ulla Fersen. HMS Dryad returned from the Irish Station to Portsmouth on 18 March with both Ulla Fersen and the French privateer Premier Consul, which Dryad had captured at about the same time. (Note: Although the London Gazette published the letter that Captain Charles John Moore Mansfield of Dryad wrote announcing his capture of the Premier Consul, there appears to be no letter concerning the capture of Ulla Fersen. All British accounts of the capture came from commercial press outlets.) Ulla Fersen was under the command of Lieutenant Hans Hampus Fallstedt and was on her way to the Swedish colony of Saint Barthélemy. Although clearly outgunned, as Dryad carried thirty-six 18-pounder guns and eight 32-pounder carronades, which gave her a broadside of 452 pounds, Fallstedt apparently wished to escape Cederström's fate, and decided to resist with force. British authorities detained Ulla Fersen at Portsmouth before releasing her following diplomatic negotiations.

== Fate ==
Ulla Fersen sank in a storm off the island of Usedom on 20 April 1807; her captain at the time was Major Peter Holm, who died in the sinking. There is evidence to suggest that not all her crew perished.
