= Battle of Tripoli Harbor =

Battle of Tripoli Harbor may refer to:

- First Battle of Tripoli Harbor, May 16, 1802
- Second Battle of Tripoli Harbor, October 1803 – September 1804
