= Battle of Kỳ Hòa =

1861 battle in Vietnam

- Part of Cochinchina campaign
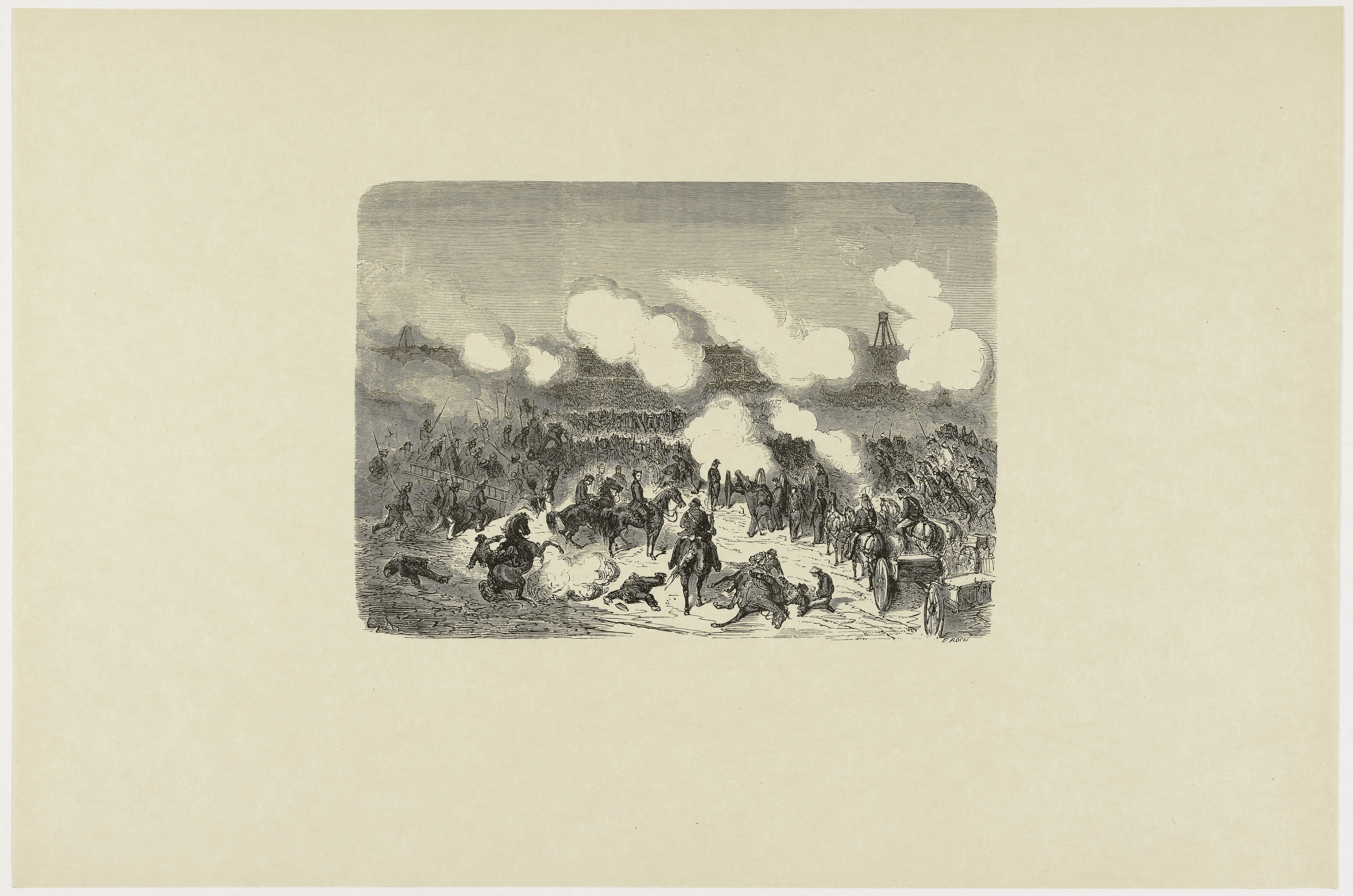
- Cochinchina expedition attacking on the Annamite fortifications near Saigon, 24 February illustrated by Gustave Doré and Emile Roch, 1861
Date	February 24–25, 1861
Location	Kỳ Hòa Cidatel, Saigon, Southern Vietnam
Result	Franco-Spanish victory

Belligerents
(Second French Empire) French Empire; (Spain) Spanish Empire; (Spain) Captaincy General of the Philippines	Nguyễn dynasty

Commanders and leaders
(Second French Empire) Léonard Charner (Second French Empire) Élie de Vassoigne	Nguyễn Tri Phương; Phạm Thế Hiển

Strength
8,000 troops (3,500 reinforced by Leonard Charner); 70 warships	10,000–21,000

Casualties and losses
12 killed 213 wounded	300 killed, rest of the army routed or captured

The Battle of Kỳ Hòa (Vietnamese: Trận Đại đồn Chí Hòa) on 24 and 25 February 1861 was an important French victory in the Cochinchina campaign (1858–62). This campaign, fought between the French and the Spanish on the one side and the Vietnamese on the other, began as a limited punitive expedition and ended as a French war of conquest. The war concluded with the establishment of the French colony of Cochinchina, a development that inaugurated nearly a century of French colonial dominance in Vietnam.

== Background ==
After early French victories at Tourane and Saigon, the Cochinchina campaign reached a point of equilibrium with the French and their Spanish allies besieged in Saigon, which had been captured by a Franco-Spanish expedition under the command of Admiral Charles Rigault de Genouilly on 17 February 1859. The arrival of massive reinforcements from the French expeditionary corps in China in 1860 allowed the French to break the Siege of Saigon and regain the initiative.

The end of the Second Opium War in 1860 allowed the French government to despatch reinforcements of 70 ships under Admiral Léonard Charner and 3,500 soldiers under Élie de Vassoigne to Saigon. Charner's squadron, the most powerful French naval force seen in Vietnamese waters before the creation of the French Far East Squadron on the eve of the Sino-French War (August 1884–April 1885), included the steam frigates Impératrice Eugénie and Renommée (Charner and Page's respective flagships), the corvettes Primauguet, Laplace and Du Chayla, eleven screw-driven despatch vessels, five first-class gunboats, seventeen transports and a hospital ship. The squadron was accompanied by half a dozen armed lorchas purchased in Macao.

== Course of battle ==
The French and their Spanish allies were besieged in Saigon by a Vietnamese army around 32,000 strong under the command of Nguyễn Tri Phương. The Vietnamese siege lines, 12 kilometres long, were centred on the village of Ky Hoa (Vietnamese: Kỳ Hòa), and were known to the French as the 'Ky Hoa lines'. Ky Hoa itself had been transformed into a formidable entrenched camp:

The first objective was the capture of the entrenched camp of Ky Hoa. This was a rectangle measuring around 3,000 metres by 900 metres, divided into five compartments separated by traverses and enclosed within walls three and a half metres high and two metres thick. The camp was armed with more than 150 cannon of all calibres. Subsidiary defences were piled up in front of its walls: wolf-pits, ditches filled with water, palisades and chevaux de frise. Bamboo was employed in the defences with consummate art, and the walls were crowned with thorn bushes along their entire length. The number of enemy soldiers both in and around the fortified camp had grown steadily during the previous year. After the victory, we discovered from the muster rolls that there were 22,000 regular troops and 10,000 militiamen. There were also 15,000 men manning the forts along the upper course of the Donnai. All these men were under the command of Nguyen Tri Phuong, the most celebrated general in the Vietnamese army.

On 24 and 25 February 1861 the French attacked and captured the Ky Hoa lines.

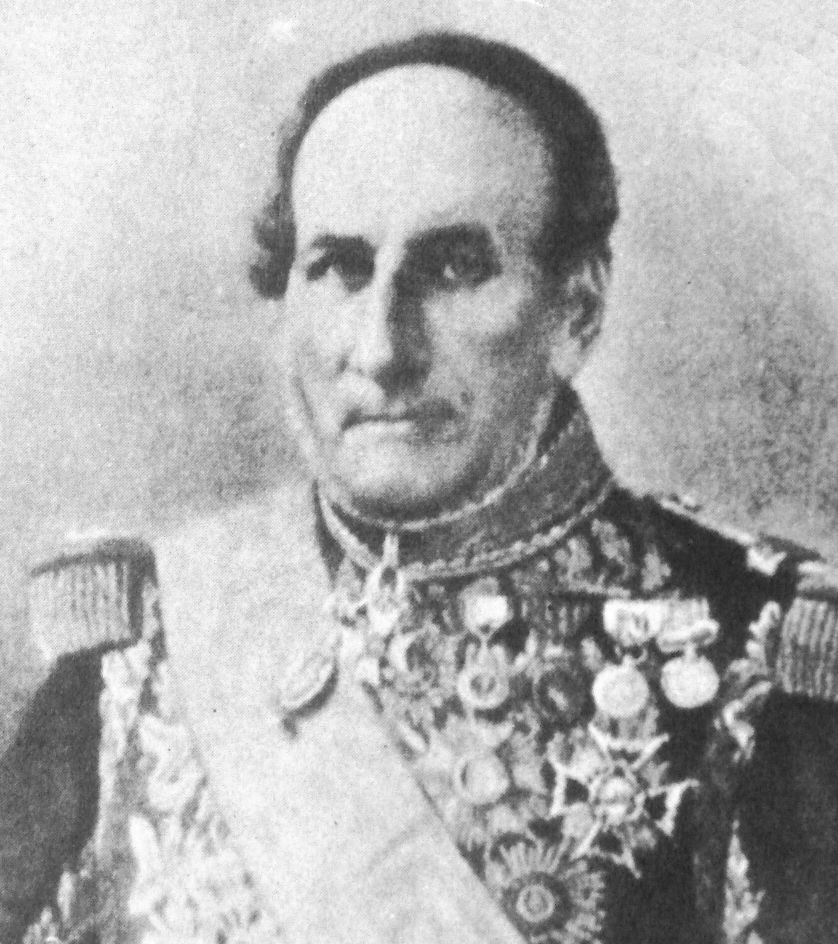
Admiral Léonard Charner, the French commander at the battle of Ky Hoa

The first assault was made on 24 February. The French artillery moved forward to a position one kilometre from the siege lines, and bombarded the Vietnamese defences. The French and Spanish infantry formed up behind the artillery positions in battalion columns. Then, at the canter, the mountain guns advanced to within 500 metres of Redoubt Fort (fort de la Redoute) and the line of entrenchments that stretched away to the east. The rest of the artillery soon followed them, and when the infantry reached this new line it split up into two assault columns, the soldiers to the right led by chef de bataillon du génie Allizé de Matignicourt, and the sailors on the left under the command of capitaine de frégate Desvaux, captain of the transport Entreprenante.

The French and Spanish assault columns charged, and captured Redoubt Fort and part of the Vietnamese trench lines. However, the attackers suffered heavily from Vietnamese fire. The French commander General de Vassoigne and the Spanish commander Colonel Palanca y Guttierez were both wounded in the attack.

A second assault was made on 25 February. The attack was made at dawn, by two columns of infantry supported by artillery. Thomazi gave the following description of the assault.

The action resumed at 5 a.m. on 25 February. The artillery advanced, facing east, enclosed by two columns of infantry: to the left, the engineers, the marine infantry and the chasseurs; to the right the Spanish infantry and the sailors. The sun, very low in the sky, was spoiling the aim of the cannons, and Lieutenant-Colonel Crouzat brought them forward by rapid bounds to within 200 metres of the enemy lines and ordered them to fire with case shot at the top of the ramparts. The firing was very heavy and our men, in the open, suffered appreciable casualties. Then the haversacks were laid on the ground, the sailors of the assault force reclaimed their scaling ladders, up to then carried by the coolies, and the admiral ordered the charge to be sounded.

The right column, led by capitaine de vaisseau de Lapelin, crossed the wolf pits, the ditches and the chevaux de frise which extended for more than 100 metres in front of the enemy work under an intense fire, and was the first to reach the parapet. Most of the scaling ladders, which were very light, had been broken during the advance. Only three were left, which were placed along the wall, and the sailors of the assault force who could not find a place there climbed on the shoulders of their comrades. This time the fighting was bitter indeed. The first men to reach the summit were killed, but others took their place, throwing grenades inside. Then, using grappling hooks, they breached the perimeter fence and entered the fort.

They then found themselves in an enclosed compartment swept by the fire from the neighbouring compartment, to which they could make no reply. It was a critical situation, and they suffered heavy losses. Finally, several resolute men, rallied by lieutenant de vaisseau Jaurès, succeeded in smashing in the gate that gave onto the other compartment with their axes, just as the engineers succeeded in breaking in, while the marine infantry and the chasseurs outflanked the enemy line on the left. The defenders were either killed where they stood or took to flight. The entire complex of the Ky Hoa lines had fallen into our hands.

Once again, French and Spanish casualties were relatively heavy (12 dead and 225 wounded). Many of the wounded, including Lieutenant-Colonel Testard, a marine infantry officer, later died as a result of their wounds. According to the French, the Vietnamese lost around 1,000 men, and their casualties included Nguyễn Tri Phương, who was wounded during the battle. According to Việt sử Tân biên of historian Phạm Văn Sơn, the Vietnamese also lost two commanders killed in the action: Tán-lý Nguyễn Duy and Tán-tương Tôn Thất Trĩ, Tham tán quân thứ Phạm Thế Hiển - the deputy of Nguyễn Tri Phương - was seriously sick and died a few days after.

== Aftermath ==
The victory at Kỳ Hòa allowed the French and Spanish to move to the offensive. In April 1861, Mỹ Tho fell to the French. In early 1862 the French captured Biên Hòa and Vĩnh Long. These victories forced the Vietnamese to sue for peace in April 1862. By then the French were not in a merciful mood. What had begun as a minor punitive expedition had turned into a long, bitter and costly war. It was unthinkable that France should emerge from this struggle empty-handed, and Tự Đức was forced to cede the three southernmost provinces of Vietnam (Biên Hòa, Gia Định and Định Tường) to France. Thus, the French colony of Cochinchina was born, with its capital at Saigon.
