= Tạ Chí Đại Trường =

Vietnamese historian

- Tạ Chí Đại Trường
- Born: Tạ Chí Đại Trường; June 21, 1938; Nha Trang, Empire of Annam, French Indochina
- Died: March 24, 2016 (aged 77); Saigon, Southeast, Vietnam
- Education: University of Saigon
- Writing career
- Years active: 1970–2015
- Genres: Archeology; Customs; Literature
- Subject: Education
- Literary movement: Modernism; Postmodernism

Tạ Chí Đại Trường, also pen name Trần Trường Thanh or Dai-truong Ta-chi (21 June 1938 – 24 March 2016), was a Vietnamese writer and historian.

== Biography ==
Tạ Chí Đại Trường was born on June 31, 1938, in Nha Trang city, but his hometown in Bình Định province. His father was a bachelor of Annamese imperial exams, Mr Tạ Chương Phùng, who participated in the independent movement in the 1940s and 1950s, then joined in the Caravelle club.

Tạ Chí Đại Trường had a cousin named Tạ Chí Diệp (1936 - 1963, a senator from the Đại Việt Nationalist Party), who was eliminated through the form of tying by President Ngô Đình Diệm's secret command at Chí Hòa Prison in summer of 1963. Mr Tạ Chí Diệp was scholar Tạ Chương Phùng's nephew, a very close comrade of President Ngô when they joined the moverment of national revolution about 1940s. It is known that Tạ Chí Diệp and Trương Tử An (Trương Tử Anh's younger brother) were found dead almost at the same time in two different locations (Nhà-Bè River and Chợ-Quán Hospital), even though they were close comrades. This death is considered by Tạ Chí Đại Trường as the collapsed signal of the Ngô Family regime.

He graduated from the University of Saigon (Viện Đại-học Sàigòn) with an MA in history in 1964 then taught history in Vietnam and published Lịch Sử Nội Chiến Việt Nam 1771-1802 (Saigon 1973), before being enrolled in the Army of the Republic of Vietnam. Its manuscript was awarded the 1970 National Awards for Scholastic Art and Writing, at the subject of History (Giải Văn-học Nghệ-thuật Toàn-quốc, bộ môn Lịch-sử) by President Nguyễn Văn Thiệu.

Tạ Chí Đại Trường was demobilized in 1974 with the rank of captain. He remained in Vietnam after the collapse of the Republic of Vietnam in 1975, and was sent to a re-education camp from 1976 to 1981 by new government. He emigrated to the United States in 1994 as a H.O. person.

However, since the early 2000s, Tạ Chí Đại Trường returned to Saigon to live with relatives because he did not feel comfortable settling abroad. He has shifted to researching traditional culture in the Northern Vietnam and has many long visits here. Hanoi National University even invited him to speak and welcome him as a head of state.

He was awarded the 2014 Phan Châu Trinh Culture Award, at the subject of research.

Tạ Chí Đại Trường died at his home in Saigon on March 24, 2016.

== Works ==
=== Poetics ===
Together with Liam C. Kelley he criticised the authenticity of the Hùng kings claiming that they were later invented and that their supposed historicity had no basis in reality. Tạ Chí Đại Trường claimed that the government of the Socialist Republic of Vietnam was unwilling to challenge the current narrative of the Hùng kings because of the adulation that the country had received in light of the Vietnam War by foreigners that admired the communists' struggle that caused it to promote the previously vague myth of the Hùng kings to become a national legend taught unquestionably to the Vietnamese people as it's a powerful origin myth, making any critical discussion about the Hồng Bàng Clan tense.

=== Books ===
Vietnamese

- Lịch sử nội chiến Việt Nam từ 1771 đến 1802 (1973)
- Thần, người và đất Việt (1989)
- Một khoảng Việt Nam Cộng Hòa nối dài (1993)
- Việt Nam nhìn từ bên trong (with author Nguyễn Xuân Nghĩa, 1994)
- Những bài dã sử Việt (1996)
- Những bài văn sử (1999)
- Bài sử khác cho Việt Nam : Sơ thảo (2009)
- Người lính thuộc địa Nam Kỳ (1861–1945) (2014)
- Chuyện phiếm sử học (2016)

English

- Human Gods in the Land of Vietnam, Culture and Information (2006)
- God of Man & Land of Vietnam (2022)
- Vietnam Tay Son Dynasty, History of Civil War 1771–1802 (2022)

== See also ==
- Phạm Văn Sơn
- Phan Nhật Nam
- Trần Ngọc Thống
- Hồ Đắc Huân
- Lê Đình Thụy
- Đỗ Thọ
