= St Margaret's Church, Rochester =

Anglican parish in Kent, England

Coordinates: 51°23′06″N 0°29′58″E

- Parish Church of St Margaret of Antioch
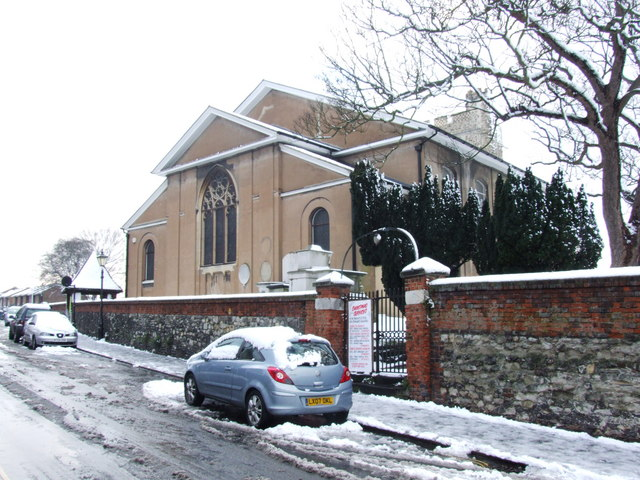
- East end in winter, viewed from St. Margaret's Street

- Shown within Kent
- OS grid reference: TQ 74022 68064
- Location: Rochester, Kent
- Country: England
- Denomination: Anglican
- Website: www.parishofrochester.org.uk

History
- Status: Chapel of Ease

Architecture
- Functional status: Active
- Heritage designation: Grade II*
- Designated: 24 October 1950
- Architectural type: Church

Specifications
- Materials: ragstone (tower) and rendered brick (church)

Administration
- Province: Canterbury
- Diocese: Rochester
- Deanery: Rochester
- Parish: Rochester

Clergy
- Vicar: Vacant

St Margaret's Church, Rochester is now a Chapel of Ease within the parish of St Peter with St Margaret, Rochester. Previously it was the parish church of St Margaret's Without (that is, outside the city walls of Rochester). Thorpe records it as having previously been called St Margaret's in Suthgate. The building is a Grade II* listed building, English Heritage number 173172. (Note: See also British Listed Buildings under number 173175)

== History ==
The first record of St Margaret's is in an 1108 charter of Bishop Gundulf: "the altar of St Nicholas, which is parochial in the church of the blessed Andrew with the church of St Margaret which pertains to it". (Note: "Et altare Sancti Nicholai quod est parochiale in ecclesia beati Andreae cun ecclesia Sanctae Margaretae que appendet" quoting Thorpe's edition of the Registrum Roffense.) From the time of Bishop Gundulf until the appointment of William Talvez in 1272 as Vicar, St. Margaret's was a chapel of the parish of St. Nicholas. There was at that time no separate parish church of St. Nicholas, instead the parochial altar was housed in the nave of Rochester Cathedral. From this dependency Wheatley has suggested that St. Margaret's was a chapel of ease to the cathedral, but the cathedral itself was never a parish church. (Note: Canon Wheatley (vicar: 1915–1947), cited by Parish of Rochester 2020)

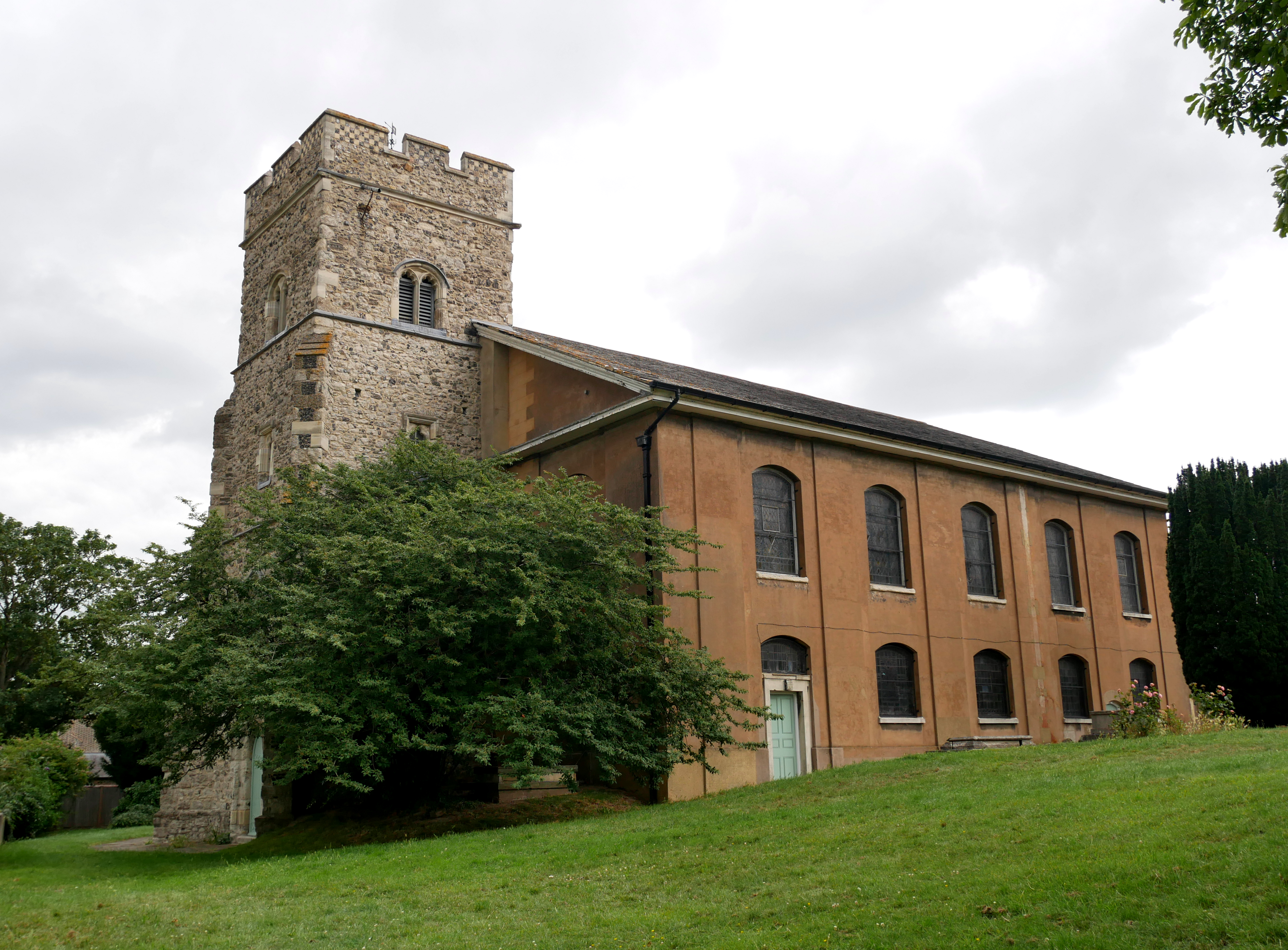
Ancient and modern: a view of the church from the southwest

During the reign of King Richard I (1157–1199), bishop Gilbert de Glanville gave the church to his hospital in Strood. After several appeals to the pope the monks of Rochester regained control of it in 1255. The early vicars, up to 1401, received only a yearly stipend from the convent. A settlement in that year endowed the church and established a vicarage and lands for the support of it. In 1488 the convent finally relinquished control, the bishop reserving to himself episcopal rights. In 1540, during the Reformation, the church was surrendered into the King's hands and subsequently settled on the newly founded Dean and Chapter of Rochester.

The earliest, and only medieval, part of the building is the tower which was either constructed or restored in 1465. The medieval church consisted of a nave and two chancels to the south of the nave, of this nothing remains. During the reign of Charles II of England (de facto 1660–1685) a coronet "set round with precious stones" was dug up in the churchyard. It was supposed locally that a Saxon King had been buried there.

The original parish was rural, stretching from the city walls of Rochester in the north to Borstal in the south. During the 18th and 19th centuries the City of Rochester expanded south into the parish. Expansion of Rochester to the north and west is blocked by the River Medway and to the east by Chatham. The medieval church became inadequate for the growing population and in 1823 rebuilding started. The new nave was complete the following year, the original chancel, tower and side chapels being retained. With the exception of the tower the medieval buildings were demolished a few years later and by 1840 the basic fabric of the present building was complete. A new east window was installed in 1872.

Internally the 1840 triple-decker pulpit was lowered and moved in 1872, as were the box pews from the nave. At the same time the west end gallery was removed and the original barrel organ replaced with a small organ at the east of the south aisle built by George Holdich of London. This organ was not to last for long, for in 1877 it was replaced by the current organ, which necessitated removing the gallery above it. A new reredos and altar were added in the early 20th century.

Following amalgamation of the parishes of St Margaret and St Peter, St Margaret's again became a chapel of ease. Severe damage to the roof in the storms of 1987 and 1990 added to existing consideration of its closure. However local efforts have kept the building viable and over £100,000 has been spent on internal improvements.

== Architecture ==
=== Exterior ===
Externally the main body of the church is an undistinguished 19th-century building. The plan is nearly a plain rectangle with rendered brick walls and a low pitched slate roof. The side windows are typical iron frames of the period, with separate gallery and ground floor openings. The east end features the 1872 Neo-Gothic window with three lights.

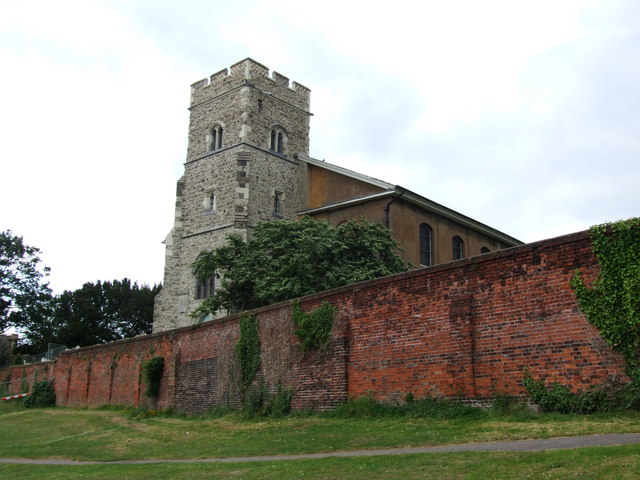
St Margaret's Church, Rochester

The west end is dominated by the medieval stone tower. The stone is random-laid ragstone with flint dressings in parts. The tower is crenellated with three stages. The lowest stage is divided externally by a string course between the door and the window. Above it is the old ringing chamber and above that the bell chamber. In the northeast corner of the tower, adjacent to the nave wall is a small stair turret with an external door. This gives access to the old ringing chamber, the bell chamber and the roof. There are three step diagonal buttresses on the western corners, the east of the tower is effectively buttressed by the nave. A perpendicular style three-light window above the west door illuminates the ground floor.

A lych gate to the south of the church leads into the southern section of the graveyard which has generally been levelled. Some of the stones form a path from the lych gate to the nave door and beyond to the west door. Others have been placed against the boundary wall. The resulting area is pleasant open grass with superb views across the Medway valley. Conversely, the tower dominates the skyline when viewed from Strood. The northern section of the graveyard (which has its own access from the street) has more of the grave markers still in situ. The east end of the church has additional doors leading to the vestries and the stairs to the gallery.

In 2008 the tower had a major restoration with some replacement of stones. The roofs (tower and turret) were replaced and work to the bell chamber louvres was carried out.

=== Interior ===
The interior of the church is based on the 1824 preaching chapel design. The rectangular interior is reduced in width at the east end by vestries and stairs. The galleries down both sides contribute to an impression only of a cruciform shape. The supporting wooden columns are in Doric style below and are carried up to the ceiling as Ionic style. The base of the tower is a few steps lower than the nave and is the current ringing chamber.

The present choir stalls were installed in 1898.

The 21st century has seen two adaptions at the west end. A kitchen has been built in the northwest corner and a WC in the southwest. New heating has been installed.

== Notable connections ==
- Captain Charles John Moore Mansfield of HMS Minotaur (74 guns, 3rd rate) which fought at the Battle of Trafalgar during which he captured the enemy 80-gun ship Neptuno. There is a memorial to him in the north gallery.
- John Newton, reformed slaver turned abolitionist and priest. The composer of the hymn "Amazing Grace", he was married in the medieval church in 1750 to a local girl.
- Sir Thomas Osborne, 9th Baronet married on 6 April 1816 Catherine Rebecca Smith (1796 – 10 October 1856), granddaughter of The Rev. James Ramsay the abolitionist.
- Russell Thorndike, actor and children's author, brother of Sybil, born while his father was Vicar.
- Dame Sybil Thorndike was the daughter of Canon Arthur Thorndike who moved to Rochester to become Vicar of St. Margaret's. Sybil taught in the Sunday School.
Captain Mansfield

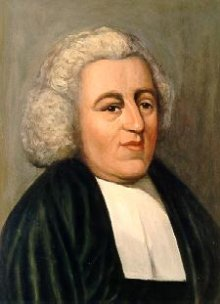
John Newton

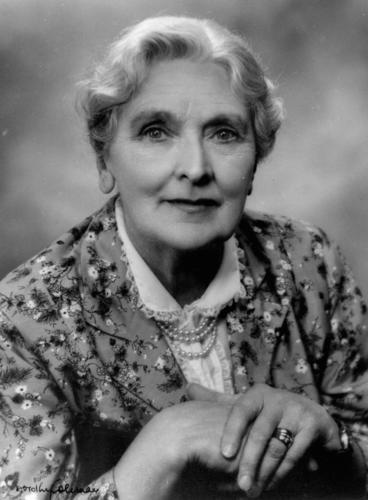
Sybil Thorndike

== Music ==
=== Organ ===
The current organ is based on the 1877 instrument by Forster and Andrews of Hull. It was modified and extended by F. H. Browne of Canterbury in 1902. There is a single pedal stop, a 16-foot bourdon. The great has 8-foot open diapason, stopped diapason treble, stopped diapason bass, dulciana and gamba; 4-foot principal and flute; 2 2/3-foot twelfth and 2-foot fifteenth. The swell has 8-foot open diapason, gedact, slicional, oboe and horn as well as 4-foot gemshorn.

=== Bells ===
There is a ring of eight bells, with the tenor weighing 9 long cwt 2 qr 8 lb (1,072 lb or 486 kg) tuned to G flat hung in the English style for full circle ringing.

Five bells were recorded in 1552, but the earliest extant bell is from 1621. This is currently number 6 but was then the third of five. Three years later the number 7 bell (then the fourth) was recast. In 1761 the 4 and 8 (then treble and tenor) were recast. In 1790 number 5 (then the second) was recast and a new treble added to make a six-bell ring. However, Hasted records five bells in 1798, which was the position before the 1790 recasting and augmentation. In 1884 the 4 and 8 (then two and six) were again recast. Finally in 1896 two new trebles were added to make the existing ring of eight.

For the latter quarter of the 20th century, the bells were unringable, but a major project in 2005–2006 saw the bells removed, retuned (at the Whitechapel Bell Foundry) and rehung in a new frame. They are now rung from the ground floor instead of the 1960 ringing chamber.
