= Russian occupation of Gotland =

1808 occupation during the Finnish War

Occupation of Gotland
- Part of the Finnish War (Napoleonic Wars)
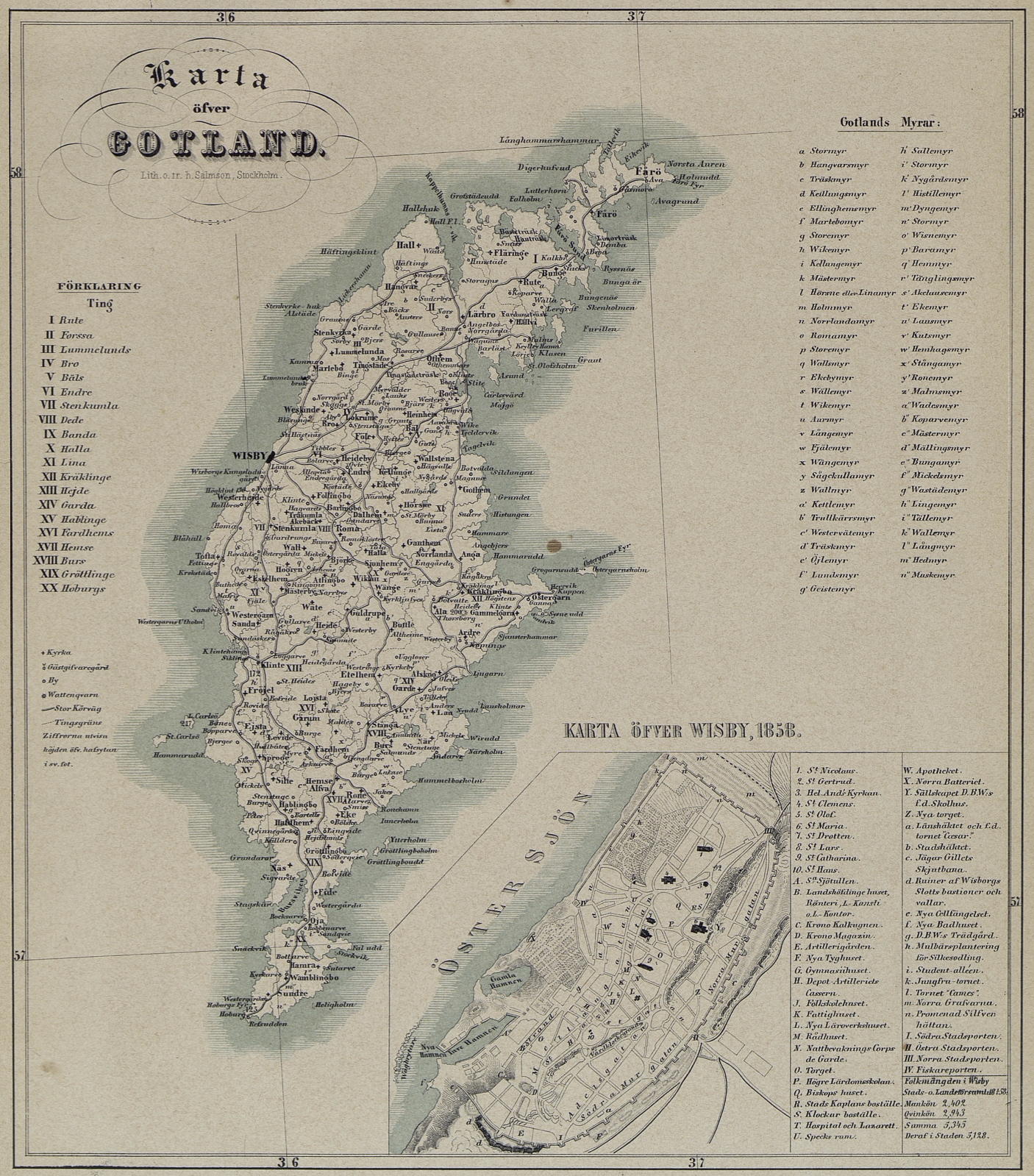
- 1858 map of Gotland
Date	22 April – 18 May 1808
Location	Gotland, Sweden
Result	Swedish victory
Territorial changes	Russians leave Gotland

Belligerents
Sweden	Russian Empire

Commanders and leaders
Rudolf Cederström; Erik af Klint (surrendered)	(Russian Empire) Nikolai Bodisko (surrendered)

Strength
2,000	1,800; 9 merchant ships

Casualties and losses
1 dead	1,800 surrendered (Note: The Russian force was allowed to leave Gotland on the condition that they would not fight Sweden within one year.)

The Russian occupation of Gotland took place in April and May 1808, during the Finnish War between Sweden and Russia.

== History ==
Russia had invaded Finland on 21 February 1808. An invasion force of nine Russian merchant ships left Liepāja and landed 22 April, after losing its course due to fog, at Slesviken in Grötlingbo on south Gotland with 1,800 men and six artillery guns under the command of Admiral Nikolai Andreevich Bodisko. After some initial confusion, beacons raised an invasion alarm which eventually reached the county governor, the retired marine officer Erik af Klint. Af Klint started organizing an armed force in Gotland following orders from Stockholm.

However, Gotland had no troops ready at the time of the invasion. Instead af Klint had to raise a peasant levy. The levy encountered the Russian expeditionary force at Klinte Church and Ajmunds bro. Af Klint judged the military situation unfavorable and decided to surrender without a fight. On 23 April the surrender took place, without documents, at the Sandäskes inn in Sanda. The next day the Russian force marched into Visby and found quarters. Bodisko proclaimed himself governor of Gotland, but Swedish officials – except for af Klint – were allowed to remain.

The two Swedish ships of the line Tapperheten and Manligheten were sent from Karlskrona and blockaded the harbor of Slite beginning 12 May, hampering the possibility of Russian reinforcements. A Swedish relief expedition under the command of Admiral Rudolf Cederström was dispatched from Karlskrona on 11 May with the ships of the line Konung Gustav IV Adolph, Vladislaff, Prins Fredrik Adolph and Äran, the frigate Bellona 5, the brigantines Svala and Disa and the yacht Fortuna. On board were soldiers from Småland commanded by the lieutenant-colonel of the Jönköping Regiment, Carl Johan Fleetwood (1757–1834).

When news reached Visby that Swedish forces were on Gotland, the Russians capitulated. The Swedish force of over two thousand had by this time marched to Tule in Ganthem from Sandviken in Gammelgarn, where the Swedish fleet squadrons had arrived on 14 May. The Russians evacuated Visby on 17 May and left Gotland via Slite the next day.

== Losses ==
The only loss associated with the Russian occupation was boatsman Carl Fredrik Lindgren (1777–1808), who fell to his death from the rigging of the flagship, Konung Gustav IV Adolph, at Sandviken. He was buried at Syssne udd.

== Aftermath ==
Nikolai Bodisko was court-martialed and lost his commission (which he later regained).

In Sweden, the occupation led to the organization of national conscription, and Gotland National Conscription was the first unit raised in 1811.

== See also ==
- Gotland National Conscription

== Sources ==
- Sandström, Åke; Wikström, Lena (2009). Ryss'n kummar! (in Swedish). Gotland University Press. ISBN 9789186343002.
- Sandström, Åke (6 May 2008). "Den ryska ockupationen av Gotland 1808" (PDF) (in Swedish). Archived (PDF) from the original on 19 May 2021.
- "Den ryska ockupationen av Gotland 1808" (in Swedish). Archived from the original on 7 December 2013.
- Hägg, Ingemund (2013). "Graven på Sysneudd" (PDF) (in Swedish). Östergarn-Gammelgarns Hembygdsförening. Archived from the original (PDF) on 3 September 2014.
- Unger, Gunnar (1909). Illustrerad svensk sjökrigshistoria: afsedd för undervisningen vid k. sjökrigsskolan. Del 1, omfattande tiden intill 1680 (in Swedish). Stockholm: Bonniers. pp. 228–32. OCLC 28393050.
- Koskelainen, Mika (22 March 2008). "I spåren efter den ryska invasionen av Gotland 1808" (in Swedish). Sveriges Radio. Archived from the original on 15 June 2021.
