= Nikolai Bodisko =

Russian counter admiral who captured Gotland during the Finnish War

Nikolai Andreevich Bodisko
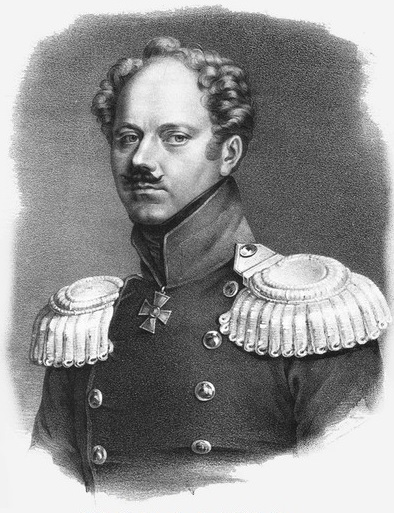
- Born: September 23, 1756; Saint Petersburg, Russian Empire
- Died: November 1, 1815 (aged 59); Sveaborg, Grand Duchy of Finland

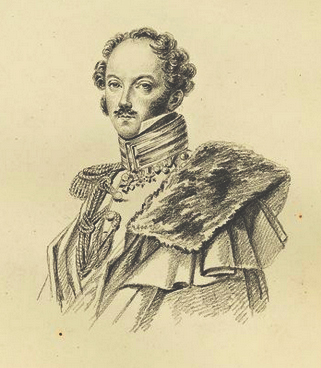
Nikolai Bodisko. Drawing by Maria Röhl (1827).

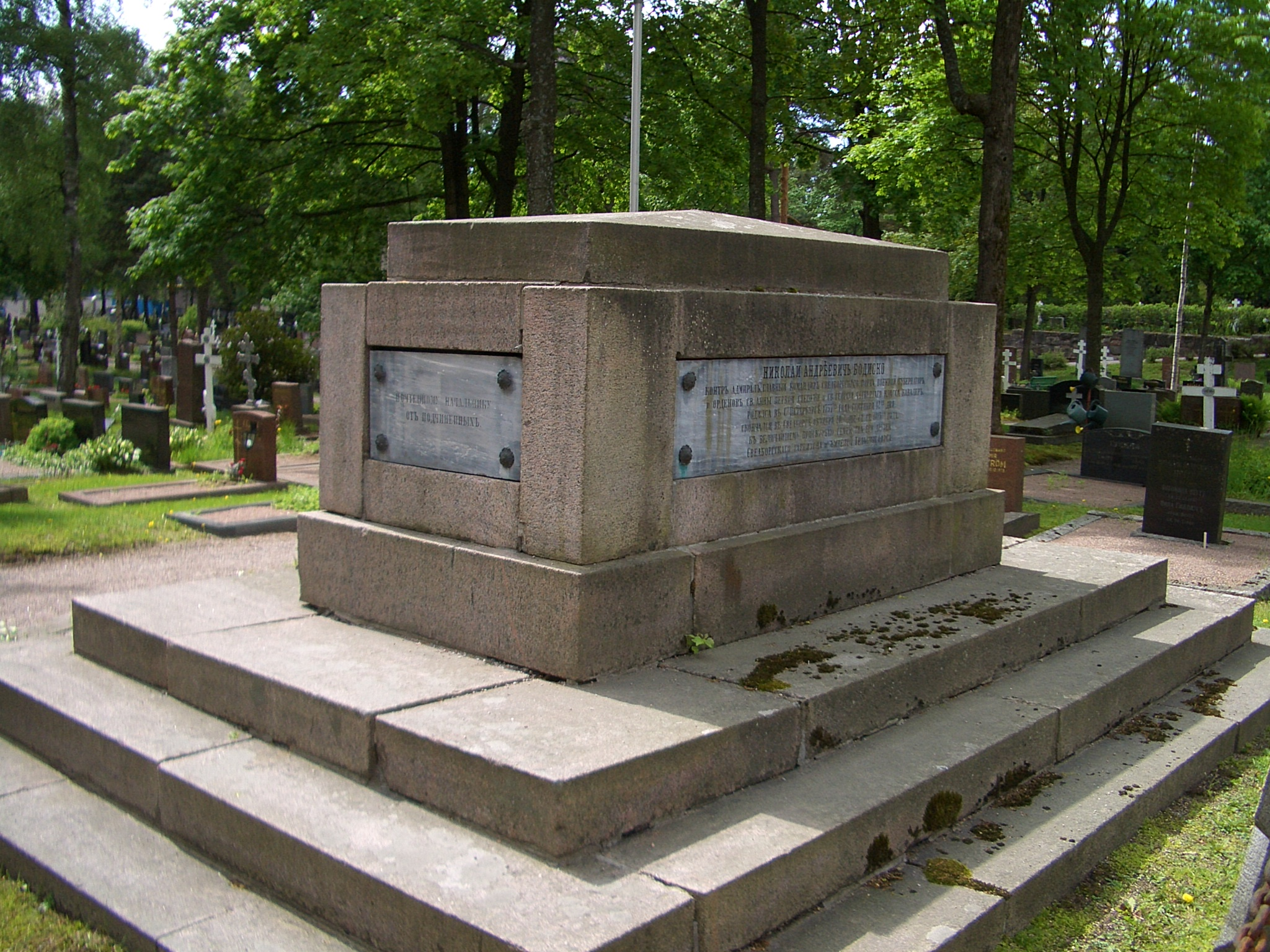
Admiral Bodisko's grave at the Orthodox cemetery in Helsinki.

Nikolai Andreevich Bodisko (Russian: Николай Андреевич Бодиско; 23 September 1756 – 1 November 1815) was a Russian counter admiral.

Bodisko participated in the wars against Napoleonic France before the Treaties of Tilsit in 1807. During the Finnish War he commanded the Russian forces that landed on Gotland on 22 April 1808 and occupied the island. When a Swedish naval force under counter admiral Rudolf Cederström arrived on 16 May, the Russian situation became hopeless. Bodisko capitulated and the Russian forces returned home. This was not appreciated by emperor Alexander I who exiled Bodisko to Vologda. Bodisko was eventually pardoned by the emperor and became commander of the Sveaborg Fortress (today Suomenlinna) at Helsinki.
