= Raid on Baltischport =

1790 raid of the Russo-Swedish War of 1788–1790

- Part of the Russo-Swedish War of 1788–1790
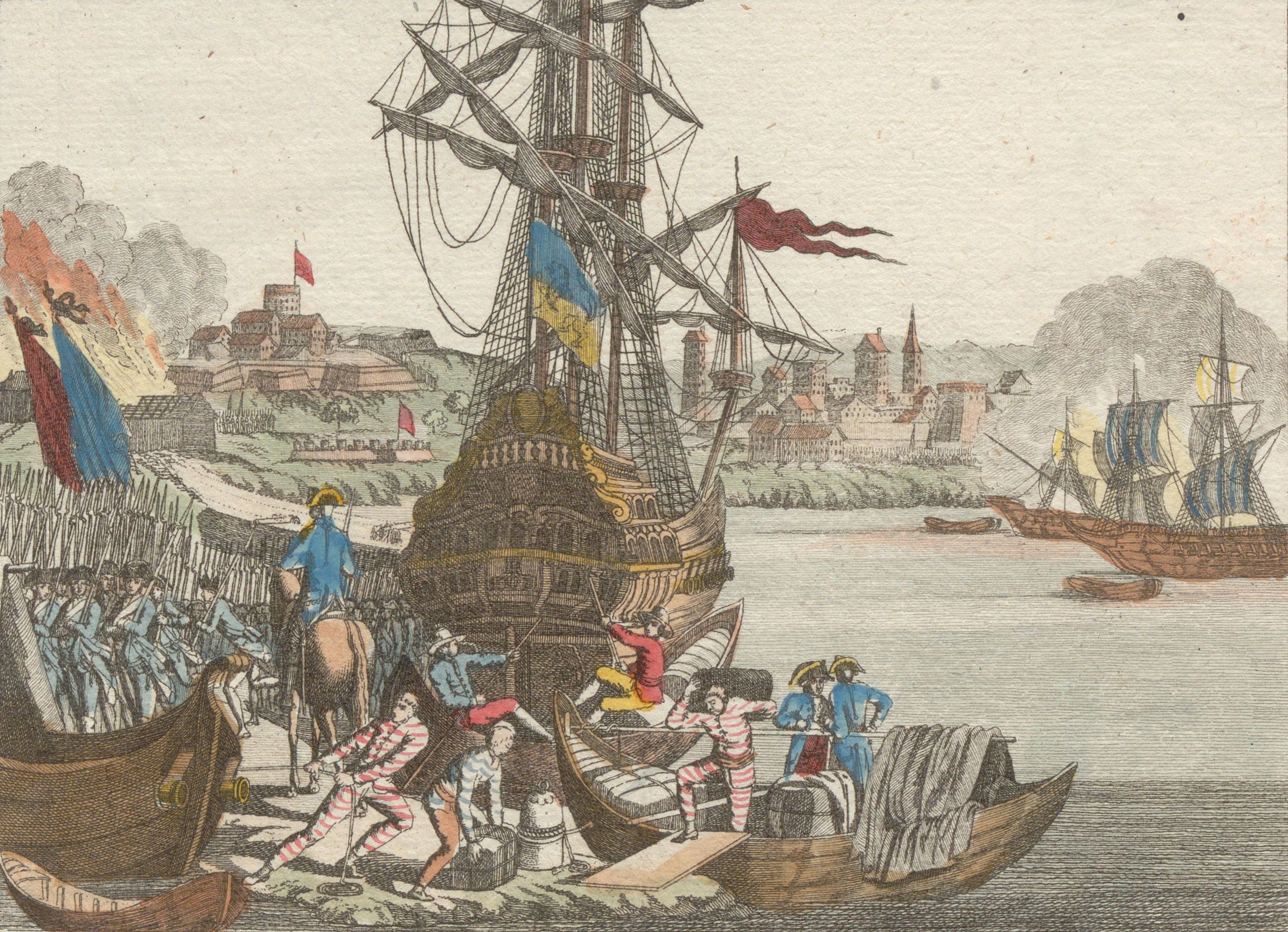
- Anonymous contemporary illustration of the raid
Date	17 March 1790
Location	Baltischport, Governorate of Estonia
Result	Swedish victory

Belligerents
Sweden	Russia

Commanders and leaders
Rudolf Cederström	de Roberty (surrendered)

Strength
2 frigates	300–360

Casualties and losses
None	300–360 captured

The raid on Baltischport occurred on 17 March 1790 during the Russo-Swedish War of 1788–1790. Two Swedish Navy frigates under Lieutenant Rudolf Cederström successfully raided the Russian-controlled port of Baltischport in the Governorate of Estonia. Leading a naval brigade of between 50 and 60 men, Cederström forced the surrender of a Russian fort after a short bombardment despite being heavily outnumbered by the fort's garrison. The Swedes proceeded to burn several warehouses in Baltischport containing naval stores, preventing their use by the Imperial Russian Navy. Cederström was promoted to major for his victory.

== Background ==
War between Russia and Sweden broke out in 1788. The Swedish Navy officer Rudolf Cederström was promoted from sub-lieutenant to lieutenant and given command of a frigate following his service at the Battle of Hogland on 17 July 1788. Cederström was ordered to spend the winter cruising in the Archipelago Sea alongside Hector, another Swedish frigate. He spent most of 1789 cruising around Gotland to keep his superiors informed of Russian movements in the Baltic, capturing several Russian merchantmen in the process. Having received Gustav III's attention, Cederström was ordered to raid Baltischport, which Swedish intelligence believed a Russian squadron of between 10–12 ships was located, before the Baltic became mostly free of ice.

== Raid ==
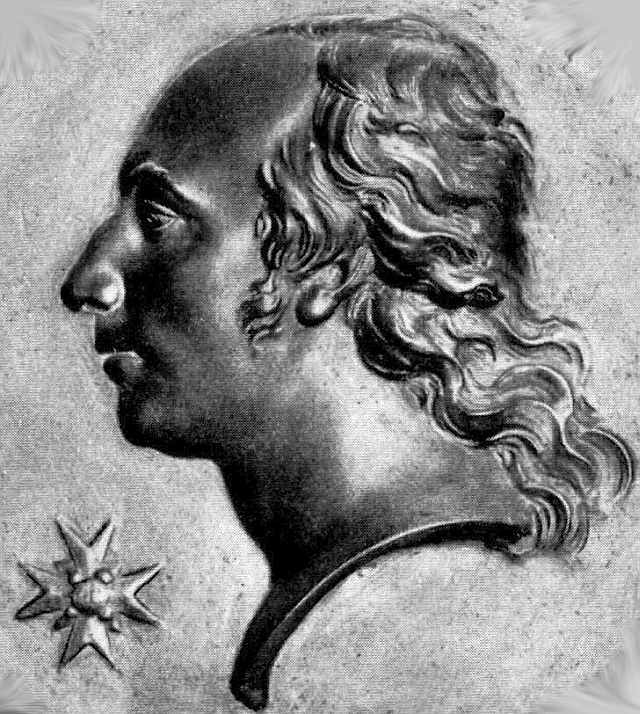
Metal portrait of Cederström

Cederström arrived at Baltischport on the morning of 17 March with the frigates Ulla Fersen and Jarramas after sailing from Karlskrona. Upon their arrival, the Swedes noted that the supposed Russian squadron was absent. Despite this, Cederström formed a naval brigade of 50–60 men and disembarked it to attack the Russian fortress in Baltischport, which contained between 300 and 360 troops under the command of Colonel de Roberty. The Swedes forced the fortress to surrender after a short bombardment despite being outnumbered 6:1. Following its surrender, Cederström successfully demanded a brandskatt of 4,000 rubles from the city. He also ordered all of the port's storehouses containing naval stores to be burnt and the fort's 49 cannons to be spiked. The Swedes subsequently departed and returned to Karlskrona.

== Aftermath ==
As a reward for his victory, Cederström was promoted to major. The raid became referenced in folk songs of the era. Catherine the Great was angered by de Roberty's decision to surrender, considering it shameful. Though the naval stores in Baltischport was no longer useful to the Russians, the raid alerted them to Swedish war plans and take them into account for any future operations.
