= HMS Netley (1808) =

Schooner of Britain's Royal Navy

History

United States
- Name: Nimrod
- Namesake: Nimrod
- Builder: Baltimore
- Launched: 1803 or 1804
- Captured: 1807

United Kingdom
- Name: HMS Netley
- Namesake: Netley
- Acquired: 1808 by purchase of a prize
- Honours and awards: Naval General Service Medal (NGSM), with clasp "Guadaloupe"
- Fate: Sold 1814

General characteristics
- Tons burthen: 140, or 1861/82 (by calc.) (bm)
- Length: 76 ft 0 in (23.2 m) (overall); 57 ft 0 in (17.4 m) (keel)
- Beam: 21 ft 6 in (6.6 m)
- Depth of hold: 7 ft 10 in (2.4 m)
- Sail plan: Schooner, later Hermaphrodite brig
- Armament: 10 × 12-pounder carronades + 2 ×6-pounder chase guns

HMS Netley was the American schooner Nimrod, launched at Baltimore in 1803 or 1804. The Royal Navy seized her in 1807, purchased her in 1808, and renamed her Netley. She participated in the 1810 invasion of Guadeloupe and also was the cause of an incident at Baltimore that same year. She was probably sold in 1814.

== American schooner ==
Nimrod was launched in 1803 or 1804, at Baltimore.

In 1807 she was at Baltimore with a cargo of sugar, cocoa, coffee, sarsaparilla, and hides, having returned from a voyage to the West Indies. She set sail again carrying a Spanish certificate attesting that she was carrying wheat to the British army in Spain. Although such a voyage would have been illegal under the United States's Embargo Act of 1807, the hope was that the certificate would protect Nimrod from seizure by the British.

The British nevertheless seized Nimrod. On 27 September 1807 HMS Dryad captured Nimrod, H. Nicholayson, master.

== Royal Navy service ==
After the Royal Navy seized her in 1807, it purchased her in 1808. It named her Netley, there being a HMS Nimrod in service, and HMS Netley just having been lost. Lieutenant Jackson was her commander between 1809 and 1812.

Netley, Lieutenant Jackson, participated in the capture of Guadeloupe in January and February 1810. (Note: A first-class share of the prize money for Guadaloupe was worth £113 3s 1¼d; a sixth-class share, that of an ordinary seaman, was worth £1 9s 1¼d.) In 1847 the Admiralty awarded the Naval General Service Medal with clasp "Guadaloupe" to all surviving participants of the campaign.

Netley then sailed to Baltimore for supplies and possibly dispatches. While she was there local residents of Fells Point heard that she had an impressed American on board. A deputation came to the brig, confronted Jackson, and informed him that he had one hour to release the American, which he did, sailing away shortly thereafter.

Lieutenant G. Green replaced Jackson in 1812.

== Fate ==
Netley went into Ordinary in 1813 and was probably sold in 1814.
