= First Battle of Tripoli Harbor =

1802 naval battle

- Part of the First Barbary War
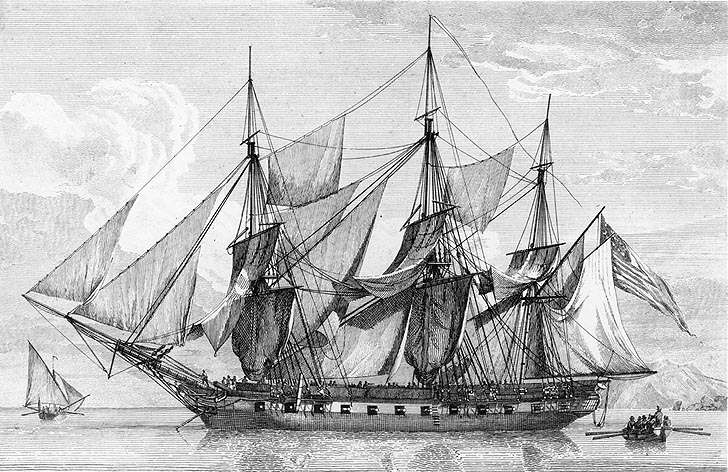
- USS Boston
Date	May 16, 1802
Location	Off Tripoli, Mediterranean Sea 32°54′17″N 13°11′36″E
Result	Inconclusive

Belligerents
Sweden; United States	Tripolitania

Commanders and leaders
Rudolf Cederström; United States Daniel McNeill	Burak Rouse

Strength
3 frigates	7 corsairs

Casualties and losses
None	1 corsair grounded

The First Battle of Tripoli Harbor was a naval battle fought on May 16, 1802, in Tripoli Harbor between a combined force consisting of the American frigate USS Boston and two Swedish Navy frigates against several Tripolitan Barbary corsairs. The Swedish-American force was enforcing the blockade when an engagement broke out between it and Tripolitan forces. The Allied fleet damaged the Tripolitan squadron as well as the harbor fortifications before withdrawing and resuming the blockade.

== Background ==
USS Boston under Captain McNeill had been sent to Tripoli to blockade the port and prevent any ships from entering or leaving. Leaving for Tripoli in January she discovered that four Swedish ships had already begun a blockade of the port. Along with the Swedish vessels she attempted to chase down corsairs attempting to break the blockade with little success, as the Swedish vessels were quite large and cumbersome making it difficult for them to pursue the small Tripolitan galleys that darted in and out of the port's harbor.

== Battle ==
On May 16, Boston with the Swedish frigate Fröja managed to chase down a Tripolitan corsair (a ship owned and staffed by Muslim Slave Traders), disabling it by forcing it to beach itself. Six other corsairs then sortied from the harbor in an attempt to screen the first one. The American and Swedish frigates managed to deter their attempts until another ship arrived in the harbor. The Swedish frigate began bombarding the harbor fortifications while Boston left to meet the new vessel. This gave the corsairs an opportunity to make another attempt at assisting the beached vessel. Shortly thereafter Boston realized that the newly arrived ship was merely another Swedish frigate. Realizing his mistake, Captain McNeil turned his ship around and engaged the Tripolitan ships once more firing several broadsides into them and damaging several. The action then concluded with the three frigates resuming their blockade stations having taken no damage while inflicting several losses on the enemy.

== Aftermath ==
The action did little to prevent corsairs from using Tripoli as a base of operations. Besides this action, no other serious attempt was made by the blockading squadron to enforce the blockade. USS Constellation later arrived to bolster the attempt at denying the harbors use by the Tripolitans. The Swedish decided to make their own peace with Tripoli, leaving the two American frigates to enforce the blockade themselves, but the Americans soon ran short of provisions and also withdrew, thereby lifting the blockade and leaving the port open to the enemy.

== See also ==
- Capturing of Manuel Briones
- Swedish-Tripolitanian War (1796-1802)
