= Swedish–Tripolitanian war (1796–1802) =

Naval conflict between Sweden and Ottoman Tripolitonia (1796–1802)

- Part of the First Barbary War
Date	1796 – October 1802
Location	Mediterranean Sea
Result	Tripolitanian victory

Belligerents
Ottoman Tripolitania	Sweden

Commanders and leaders
(Ottoman Tripolitania) Yusuf Karamanli (Ottoman Tripolitania) Burak Rouse	(Sweden) Gustav IV Adolf (Sweden) Rudolf Cederström (Sweden) David Gustaf Blessingh (Sweden) Carl Gustaf Tornquist

Strength
Unknown	Four frigates: Thetis; Fröja; Camilla; Sprengporten; One brig: Husaren; One warship: Thundera

Casualties and losses
Unknown	Over 20 ships captured 160 sailors captured

The Swedish–Tripolitanian war was a naval conflict that took place from 1796 to 1802 between Sweden and Tripolitania over tribute payments.

== Background ==
Tripolitan leader Yusuf Karamanli aimed to maintain power by reorganizing the military, expanding the fleet, and pushing into the southern Sahara. Trouble arose when Sweden and Denmark were slow to send gifts to him. In response, he seized ships from both countries to pressure them. Despite new demands reaching Sweden in 1794, Yusuf Karamanli insisted on renegotiating a peace treaty, ignoring objections from both the Ottoman Empire and Sweden. Unlike his father, who had honored peace agreements with Sweden, Yusuf Qaramanli repeatedly declared war on Sweden and captured several ships.

== War ==
In 1797 Major David Gustaf Blessingh left Sweden with the frigate Thetis and the brig of war Husaren to resolve the conflict. In June 1798, the Tripolitans captured 20 ships and 160 Swedish sailors. Sweden started negotiating for peace soon after. Sweden and Denmark paid $100,000 for the release of their captives. The peace treaty of 1798 was unstable, prompting Yusuf Karamanli to declare war on Sweden once again in 1800. Sweden sent Lieutenant-Colonel Carl Gustaf Tornquist to negotiate a new peace treaty in early 1801 to free the hostages. The Swedes did not ratify it due to the harsh Tripolitan demands. In January 1801, the Swedish warship "Thundera" sailed into Tripoli Harbor with a white flag. During the conflict with Sweden, four merchant ships were seized and sold to Tunis, with their crews held hostage by Karamanli.

=== Blockade of Tripoli Harbor ===
In 1802 Swedish and American warships worked together to blockade Tripoli Harbor. They helped each other with convoys for their merchant ships, until a new peace treaty was signed. Sweden's Consul Burström reported that despite the treaty, the joint blockade didn't work because Tripoli's corsair galleys still accessed the port. Burström noted that the blockade's failure pleased Yusuf Karamanli.

== Aftermath ==
In October 1802 Sweden withdrew from the First Barbary War and paid a significant tribute to Tripolitania, while the Regency of Tripoli continued the war against the Americans before eventually signing peace with the United States in 1805.

== Sources ==
- Mika, Suonpää (2019). Diplomacy and Intelligence in the Nineteenth-Century Mediterranean World. Bloomsbury Publishing. ISBN 9781474277051.
- Müller, Leos (2021). Facing the Sea. Nordic Academic Press. ISBN 9789189361119.
- Raymond, F.Aubé (2001). Across Troubled Waters. AuthorHouse. ISBN 9780759617247.
- Goetze, Dorothée (2023). Early Modern European Diplomacy. De Gruyter. ISBN 9783110672008.
- Ahmida, Ali Abdullatif (2011). The Making of Modern Libya. State University of New York Press. ISBN 9781438428932.
