= French ship Mont-Blanc =

A number of French ships have borne the name Mont-Blanc, in honour of the Mont Blanc mountain. Among them,

- The ship of the line Mont Blanc (1793)
- The civilian cargo ship SS Mont-Blanc (1899) of the Compagnie Générale Transatlantique, which when carrying ammunition during World War I blew up in the Halifax Explosion of 1917.
