= Sound (nautical) =

Determining depth of water beneath a ship or in a tank

In nautical terms, the word sound is used to describe the process of determining the depth of water in a tank or under a ship. Tanks are sounded to determine if they are full (for cargo tanks) or empty (to determine if a ship has been holed) and for other reasons. Soundings may also be taken of the water around a ship if it is in shallow water to aid in navigation.

== Methods ==
Tanks may be sounded manually or with electronic or mechanical automated equipment. Manual sounding is undertaken with a sounding line- a rope with a weight on the end. Per the Code of Federal Regulations, most steel vessels with integral tanks are required to have sounding tubes and reinforcing plates under the tubes which the weight strikes when it reaches the bottom of the tank. Sounding tubes are steel pipes which lead upwards from the ships' tanks to a place on deck.

Electronic and mechanical automated sounding may be undertaken with a variety of equipment including float level sensors, capacitance sensors, sonar, etc.

== See also ==
- Depth sounding

== Sources ==
- Code of Federal Regulations, Title 46
