= Charles John Moore Mansfield =

British naval officer (1760–1813)

Captain Charles John Moore Mansfield
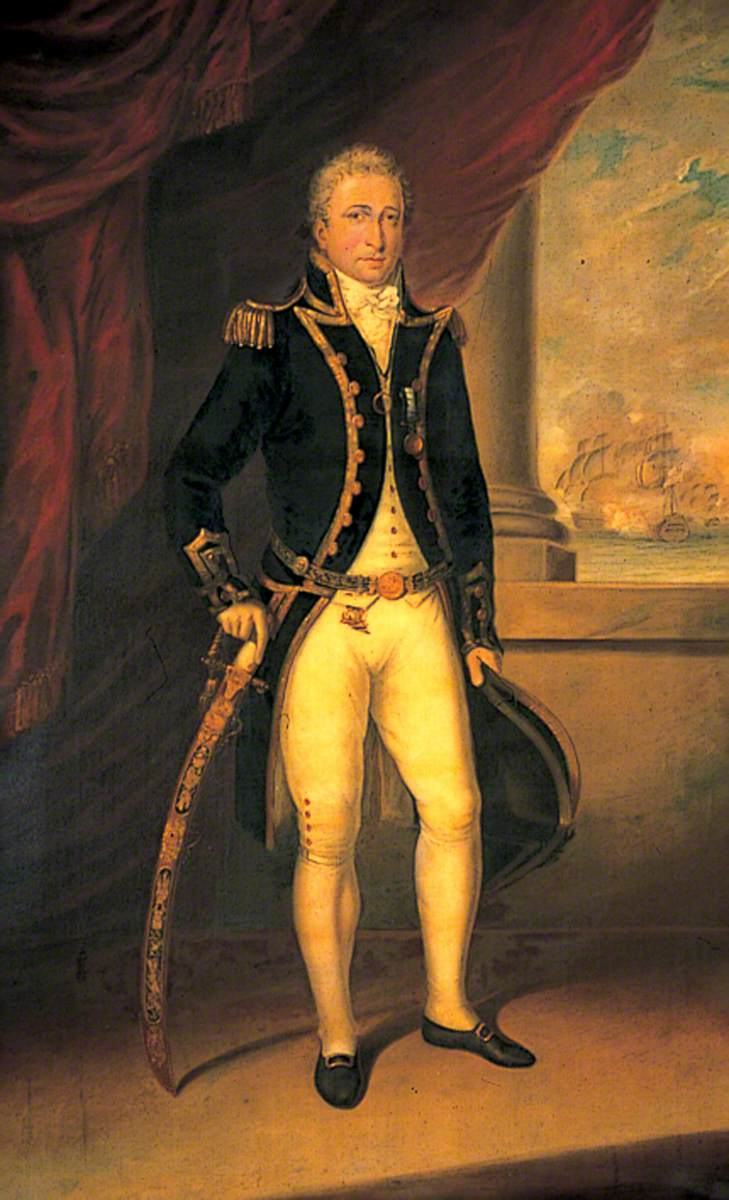
- Born: 15 November 1760; Stoke Damerel, Devonport, Devon, England
- Died: 23 April 1813 (aged 52); Rochester, Kent, England
- Military career
- Allegiance: United Kingdom
- Branch: Royal Navy
- Service years: 1772–1807
- Rank: Captain
- Commands: HMS Megaera; HMS Sphynx; HMS Andromache; HMS Dryad; HMS Minotaur
- Conflicts: American Revolutionary War; Battle of Grenada; Battle of Martinique; Battle of the Chesapeake; Battle of Frigate Bay; Siege of Brimstone Hill; French Revolutionary Wars; Napoleonic Wars; Battle of Trafalgar; Battle of Copenhagen
- Awards: Naval Gold Medal

Captain Charles John Moore Mansfield (1760–1813) was a British naval officer who served in the Royal Navy during the American Revolutionary War, the French Revolutionary Wars and Napoleonic Wars. Unlike many of his dashing companions of this period, Mansfield is notable for his reticent social life which contrasted sharply with his dashing and action-filled military career.

== Early life ==
Mansfield was the son of a dockyard officer at Plymouth Dock in the parish of Stoke Damerel, Devonport, now part of Plymouth, Devon, born on 15 November 1760 and christened on 13 December. He joined the navy at the age of eleven in 1772 as Captain's Servant to Captain Feilding in HMS Kent, then a guard-ship at Plymouth.

== American Revolutionary War ==
After the outbreak of the American Revolutionary War, he transferred to HMS Foudroyant in 1775 under Captain John Jervis (later Earl St Vincent), who two months later rated him Midshipman. In March 1776 Mansfield transferred to the frigate Diamond which sailed for North America where he saw action.

While in America, Mansfield was made lieutenant on 25 November 1778, when only 18, two years earlier than the official minimum age of 20, joining the ship of the line HMS Albion as a junior lieutenant. In March the following year he transferred to the 74-gun ship HMS Sultan in which he was in action at the Battle of Grenada the following year and the Battle of Martinique a few months later. At the start of 1780, Mansfield was made first lieutenant of the newly captured frigate HMS Fortunée which was present as a repeating frigate at the disastrous Battle of the Chesapeake which led to Cornwallis surrendering his army. In January 1782 Mansfield was again in action at the Battle of Frigate Bay during Hood's unsuccessful attempt to relieve Saint Kitts, and where Mansfield successfully made it through enemy lines under the cover of darkness to gain intelligence from the besieged British fort on Brimstone Hill.

== Peacetime and marriage ==
Mansfield returned to England at the end of 1782, and at the start of 1783 briefly served as first lieutenant of the frigate Monsieur before joining the newly built HMS Irresistible in which he served during the peacetime for five years before returning ashore in 1788.

A few months later he married Anna Spong on 21 August 1788 at the Church of St. Edmund, Lombard Street, London. Their first child Seymour Herbert Mansfield was born on 5 December 1789, in Rochester. He died in 1802, aged 12. Their second child, Mary Mansfield was born in January 1792, and their third child, James Hawkins Hughes Mansfield, was born on 5 April 1794.

During this time little is known of his life, as he left no journals or records and atypically of a young naval officer did not make a stir in society. After two years ashore he joined HMS Lion as first lieutenant in 1790 as war threatened to break out again, moving next to HMS Assistance, and then to HMS Stately.

== French revolutionary wars ==
Soon after war was declared, Mansfield was then promoted on 19 July 1793 to Commander and took over the sloop HMS Megaera in which he made Post-Captain on 4 October 1794. Appointed to HMS Sphynx, Mansfield moved to HMS Andromache soon afterwards and in her was able to capture a large Algerian corsair with 24-guns after a fierce engagement on which 64 Algerians and two British sailors were killed. He transferred to HMS Dryad in 1799 and remained in her until after the peace in 1802.

== Napoleonic wars ==
At the conclusion of the Peace of Amiens he was given the ship of the line HMS Minotaur, a veteran ship which had fought at the Battle of the Nile. Soon after taking command he was involved in the capture of the French frigate Franchise in the English Channel and briefly served as Admiral Collingwood's flag-captain in the same ship.

Mansfield was also at the Battle of Trafalgar two years later, where although the slow speed of the Minotaur delayed his entry into the battle, Mansfield took a proactive role defending the Victory against the counterattack by Rear Admiral Dumanoir's squadron, and performed diligently with much success in forcing the surrender of the Neptuno, and taking 25 casualties. The Minotaur remained off Cadiz for the following year, returning to Britain at the end of 1806 with Mansfield suffering from debilitating rheumatism. In the spring of 1807 he was flag captain to Rear Admiral William Essington, third-in-command at the bombardment of Copenhagen, where he benefited from the prize money for the captured ships in the harbour, but was forced to retire from active service through ill-health on his return at the end of the year.

== Illness and death ==
Although a man in his position could have been expected to have received promotion and rewards at the end of the Napoleonic Wars, Mansfield never survived long enough, dying at Rochester after a period of illness in 1813. His memorial raised to him in St Margaret's Church in Rochester makes a succinct record of his life:

TO THE MEMORY OF Captn CHARLES JOHN MOORE MANSFIELD ROYAL NAVY

Who during a Period of 40 Years arduous Service
established the character of an Honorable and Gallant Officer.
In the Year 1793 he was made Commander and was
afterwards raised to the Rank of POST CAPTAIN.
While commanding the Andromache he was attacked by an Algerine Frigate
under Spanish Colors, which he captured after a long and desperate engagement.
For many years he commanded the Minotaur, and had the Honor of capturing the
El Neptuno a Spanish 80 Gun Ship in the ever memorable engagement of TRAFALGAR
Soon after this Period, worn down by fatigue he retired into the bosom of his Family,
and, after a long and afflicting illness, calmly resigned his Soul into the hands of his Maker

On the 23d day of April 1813, Aged 52 Years.
