= Phạm Văn Sơn =

South Vietnamese colonel

- Born: 1915
- Died: 1978 (aged 62–63)
- Military career
- Allegiance: South Vietnam
- Branch: Army of the Republic of Vietnam
- Rank: Colonel
- Unit: J5 (Psychological Warfare) of JGS
- Other work: Historian

Phạm Văn Sơn (1915 – 1978) was a Vietnamese historian and a Psychological warfare Colonel of the Army of the Republic of Vietnam (ARVN). He was the author of several books about Vietnam history and Vietnam war.

Betwwen 1956 and 1972, Sơn published seven volumes of the series «Việt sử tân biên» collection.

In 1969, Lt. Col. Sơn - Chief of Military History Division, J5, Joint General Staff RVNAF, collaborated with his colleague, Lt. Col. Lê Văn Dương to compile the work «The Viet Cong 'Tet' Offensive (1968)».

== 1968 Tet Offensive and aftermath ==
There are mismatch between lieutenant colonel and colonel ranks in three books: Phạm Văn Sơn's «The Viet Cong 'Tet' Offensive (1968)», Hoàng Ngọc Lung's «The General Offensives of 1968-69», and Erik B. Villard's «United States Army in Vietnam Combat Operations Staying the Course October 1967 to September 1968».

- Lung's page 102 listed: Saigon Police chief - Colonel Nguyen Van Luan and 5th Ranger Group commander - Colonel Dao Ba Phuoc among five dead in the rocket accident on 2 June. While Sơn's page 235 clarified them as Lieutenant Colonel (LTC).
- Villard's pages 588-589 listed: deputy commander of Sub-Region 2 - Col. Vo Van Hoang, and commander of Sub-Region 5 - Col. Le Van Ngot. While Sơn's page 471 listed their counterparts as LTC: Deputy commander of Regiment 165 - LTC Phan Viet Dung, deputy commissar of Military (Sub) Region 1 - LTC Tam Ha.
