= Rudolf Cederström =

Swedish Navy officer and politician (1764–1833)

General admiral Rudolf Cederström
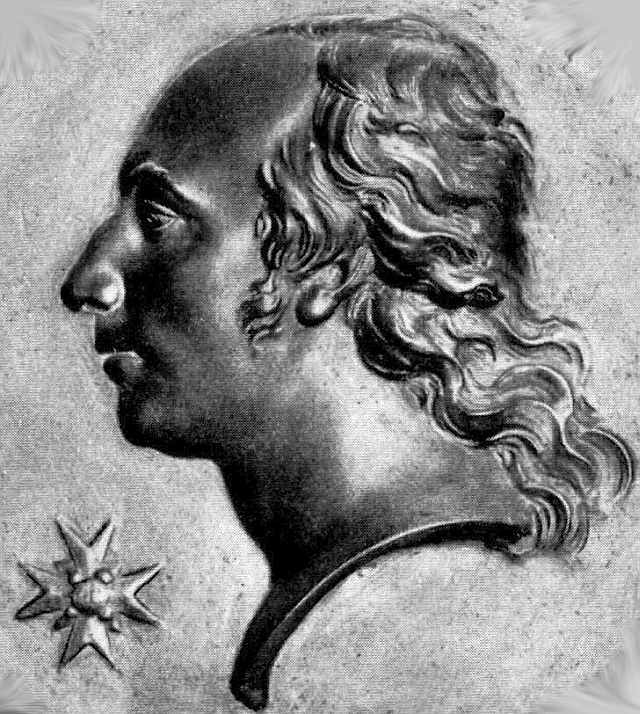
- Metal portrait of Cederström
- Born: Olof Rudolf Cederström; 8 February 1764; Landskrona, Sweden
- Died: 1 June 1833 (aged 69) Funbo, Sweden
- Allegiance: Sweden
- Branch: Swedish Navy
- Service years: 1779–1828
- Rank: General admiral
- Conflicts: Russo-Swedish War of 1788–1790; Battle of Hogland; Battle of Reval; Battle of Vyborg Bay (1790); Raid on Baltischport; First Barbary War; First Battle of Tripoli Harbor; Napoleonic Wars; Finnish War; Russian occupation of Gotland; War of the Sixth Coalition; Swedish–Norwegian War
- Spouse: Charlotta Catharina Wrangel af Sauss (m. 1793)

General-Admiral Olof Rudolf Cederström (8 February 1764 – 1 June 1833) was a Swedish Navy officer and politician. Born in Landskrona, Cederström joined the Swedish navy in 1779 and served in the Russo-Swedish War of 1788–1790. During the French Revolutionary Wars, he protected Swedish shipping in the North Sea but was sentenced to death after failing to prevent the British from detaining a convoy he was escorting. Following being pardoned and restored to his former position, Cederström was sent to the Mediterranean in 1801 and participated in the First Barbary War, overseeing 20 months of inconclusive operations before signing a peace treaty with the Regency of Tripoli.

In 1808, Cederström led an expedition which recaptured Russian-occupied Gotland during the Finnish War. He subsequently fought in the War of the Sixth Coalition, participating in the capture of Western Pomerania from Franco-Danish forces, along with the Swedish–Norwegian War in 1814. Cederström entered into a political career in 1815, but resigned from all his positions in 1828 over a controversy stemming from the sale of decommissioned warships to the Patriot governments. He retired to his estate in Uppland County, dying there in 1833.

== Early life ==
Cederström was born on 8 February 1764 in Landskrona, Sweden, the son of Claes Cederström and his wife Margareta Elisabet von Mevius. He began studying at the Uppsala University in 1776 before enlisting in the Swedish Navy in 1779.

== Naval career ==
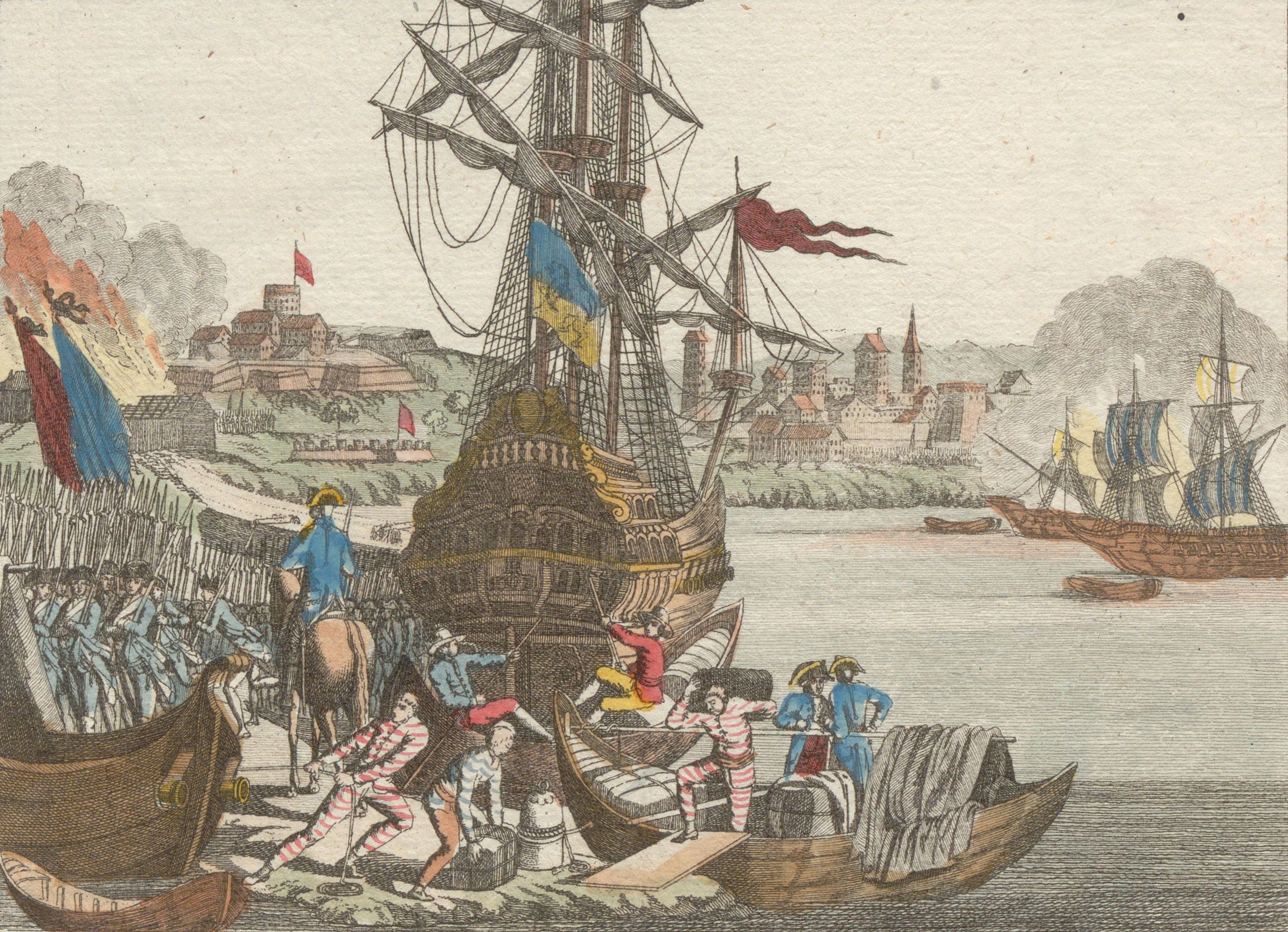
The raid on Baltischport, which Cederström led

Cederström was assigned the rank of arklimästare on 3 August 1779 and was promoted to acting sub-lieutenant on 5 June 1781. In 1784, he began serving as the harbourmaster of the Swedish colony of Saint Barthélemy and on 15 August 1785 was promoted again to sub-lieutenant. Cederström served in the Russo-Swedish War of 1788–1790; in reward for his performance at the Battle of Hogland on 17 July 1788, he was promoted to lieutenant on 21 July. Coming to Gustav III's attention, Cederström carried out a raid on Baltischport on 17 March 1790. Leading the frigates Ulla Fersen and Jarramas, Cederström forced the surrender of a Russian fort and burned a large quantity of naval stores. In reward for his victory, he was promoted to major on 26 March 1790. Cederström also served in the battles of Reval and Vyborg Bay, distinguishing himself in both engagements.

On 25 February 1793, Cederström was promoted to lieutenant colonel. He was appointed as a member of the Committee of the Navy's Equipment on 22 April 1794 and promoted again to colonel on 21 June 1795. During the French Revolutionary Wars, Cederström escorted Swedish merchant convoys in the North Sea in 1796 and 1798. He was arrested following his second escort mission for allowing British warships which heavily outgunned Ulla Fersen to detain the convoy he was escorting for inspection. Tried and sentenced to death, Cederström was eventually pardoned and restored to his former position. On 6 April 1801 he was appointed commanding officer of the High Seas Fleet (Örlogsflottan) and three days was promoted to counter admiral. In the same year, as part of the First Barbary War, Cederström was sent with a squadron to the Mediterranean to prevent further attacks by Barbary corsairs. Following 20 months of inconclusive operations, including the First Battle of Tripoli Harbor on 16 May 1802, he signed a peace treaty with the Regency of Tripoli in 1802.

In 1808, Cederström took command of a squadron tasked with protecting the Swedish coast against a possible Franco–Danish invasion. On 22 April, Russian forces occupied Gotland as part of the Finnish War, and on 11 May a relief force under Cederström left Karlskrona to retake the island; upon its arrival five days later, the Russians capitulated and were allowed to evacuate the island. Cederström was subsequently appointed as the island's vice governor, overseeing efforts to raise troops and construct defences. He was promoted to vice admiral on 29 June 1809 and served as the military commander of Gotland from 13 August 1810 to 24 September 1811. In 1813, Cederström was appointed as the Swedish navy's commander-in-chief, participating in the capture of Western Pomerania from Franco-Danish forces. He then led the Swedish navy during the Swedish–Norwegian War of 1814. Cederström was appointed military commander of Guadeloupe in 1814 and made adjutant general of the Navy on 5 August 1815. Cederström became a minister (statsråd) on 8 August 1815 and was appointed as the governor of Stockholm on 30 July 1816.

Cederström was promoted to admiral on 24 November 1818 and resigned his governorship on 15 December. He received the title of count on 11 May 1819 and was promoted to överamiral on 1 June 1820 before being appointed as a Lord of the Realm on 5 November 1821. Cederström was promoted to general admiral and appointed commanding officer of the Naval Artillery Regiment (Sjöartilleriregementet) on 7 October 1823. He was also appointed commanding officer of the Royal Majesty's Fleet, which in line with Cederström's proposals was formed by merging the High Seas Fleet and archipelago fleet. In this post, he became embroiled in a controversy over the sale of decommissioned warships to the Patriot governments via British trading houses, which led to his resignation in 1828. Cederström became an honorary member of the Uppsala County Agricultural Society on 28 January 1829.

== Personal life and death ==
On 16 February 1793, he was married Charlotta Catharina Wrangel af Sauss in Karlskrona. She was the daughter of Count Anton Johan Wrangel af Sauss and Countess Charlotta Regina Sparre af Söfdeborg. During his final years, he lived on the estate of Lövsta in Uppland County. Cederström died on 1 June 1833 at Lövsta in Funbo Parish, Uppsala County.

He was the father of:

- Claes Anton (born 1795). Became count when his father died.
- Margareta-Charlotta (25 November 1796 in Karlskrona – 21 June 1883 in Karlskrona). She was married on 25 November 1814 to Claes August Cronstedt (1785–1860).
- Gustaf Adolf (born 1797)
- Olof Rudolf (born 1800)
- Carl-Emanuel (born 1804)
- Fredrik Ture (born 1808)

== Dates of rank promotions ==
- 3 August 1779 – Arklimästare
- 5 June 1781 – Acting sub-lieutenant
- 15 August 1785 – Sub-lieutenant
- 21 July 1788 – Lieutenant
- 26 March 1790 – Major
- 22 December 1793 – Lieutenant colonel
- 21 June 1795 – Colonel
- 9 April 1801 – Counter admiral
- 1803 – Shipyard admiral
- 29 June 1809 – Vice admiral
- 24 November 1818 – Admiral
- 1 June 1820 – Överamiral
- 7 October 1823 – General admiral

== Awards, decorations and honours ==
=== Awards and decorations ===
- (Sweden) Order of Charles XIII (28 January 1825)
- (Sweden) Knight and Commander of the Orders of His Majesty the King (7 October 1816)
- (Sweden) Knight Grand Cross 2nd Class of the Order of the Sword (9 August 1814)
- (Sweden) Commander Grand Cross of the Order of the Sword (13 June 1803)
- (Sweden) Commander of the Order of the Sword (16 November 1799)
- (Sweden) Knight of the Order of the Sword (26 March 1790)

=== Honours ===
- Honorary member of the Royal Swedish Academy of War Sciences (9 December 1809)
- Honorary member of the Uppsala County Agricultural Society (28 January 1829)
