= History of Anguilla =

The history of Anguilla runs from the beginning of human habitation, probably via settlement from South America. Following a series of rebellions against white occupiers and a short-lived period as an independent republic during the 1960s, Anguilla has been a separate British overseas territory since 1980.

== Pre-Columbian Anguilla ==
The earliest inhabitants of Anguilla were Indigenous people from South America, commonly (if imprecisely) referred to as Arawaks. These people travelled to the island on rafts and in dugout canoes, settling in fishing, hunting and farming groups. Forty Indigenous villages have been excavated, the largest being those at Island Harbour, Sandy Ground, Sandy Hill, Rendezvous Bay, and Shoal Bay East. The Amerindian name for the island was Malliouhana. The earliest Amerindian artefacts found on Anguilla have been dated to around 1300 BC, and remains of settlements dating from AD 600 have been uncovered. Religious artefacts and remnants of ceremonies found at locations, such as Big Springs and Fountain Cavern, suggest that the pre-European inhabitants were extremely religious in nature. The first Indigenous population are popularly said to have been later displaced by fiercer Island Caribs, but this version of events and characterisation is disputed by some.

== Colonial Anguilla ==
The European discovery and renaming of the island is uncertain. Some claim it had been sighted by Columbus; others credit it to the French explorer René Goulaine de Laudonnière during his voyages in 1564 and 1565. The Dutch West India Company established a fort on the island in 1631. The Dutch withdrew after the destruction of the fort by Spanish forces in 1633.

Anguilla was conquered and colonised by English settlers from St. Christopher beginning in 1650. A local council was formed, overseen by Antigua. Six years later, Natives from another island attacked, killing most of the men and enslaving the women and children. In 1666, 300 Frenchmen attacked the island, driving the settlers into the forests. It was subsequently returned to the English by the terms of the 1667 Treaty of Breda. The French army assisted by a limited number of Anglo-Irish attacked in 1688, driving the English off the island to Antigua, and periods of drought during the 1680s left conditions so poor that many Anguillians left for St Croix and the British Virgin Islands in 1694. During this drought laden period there were several abortive attempt to settle on Crab Island off the coast of Puerto Rico, as the island was seen as more habitable in comparison to dry and arid Anguilla. The effort to settle Crab Island was led by Abraham Howell, and saw a handful of Anguillians partake, however, the settlers were eventually forcibly evicted by Spanish forces. In 1724, the population had rebuilt to 360 Europeans and 900 Africans.

In 1744, during the War of the Austrian Succession, 300 Anguillians and 2 privateers from St. Christopher invaded the French half of neighbouring Saint Martin, holding it until the 1748 Treaty of Aix-la-Chapelle. Two French frigates landed 700 or 1000 men at Crocus Bay on Anguilla in 1745 but were repulsed by 150 militiamen under Governor Hodge.

In 1758, during the Seven Year's War, two runaway slaves, named Pero and George, boarded an enemy French Schooner and piloted and assisted the crew in raiding Anguilla. They were both captured and sentenced to death. Pero by hanging, and George by burning alive. The Seven Year's War saw Anguilla being utilized as a base for British privateers, and a Court of Vice-Admiralty was established there for the adjudication of captured vessels and cargoes. As such, the colony was a target for French corsairs and raiders.

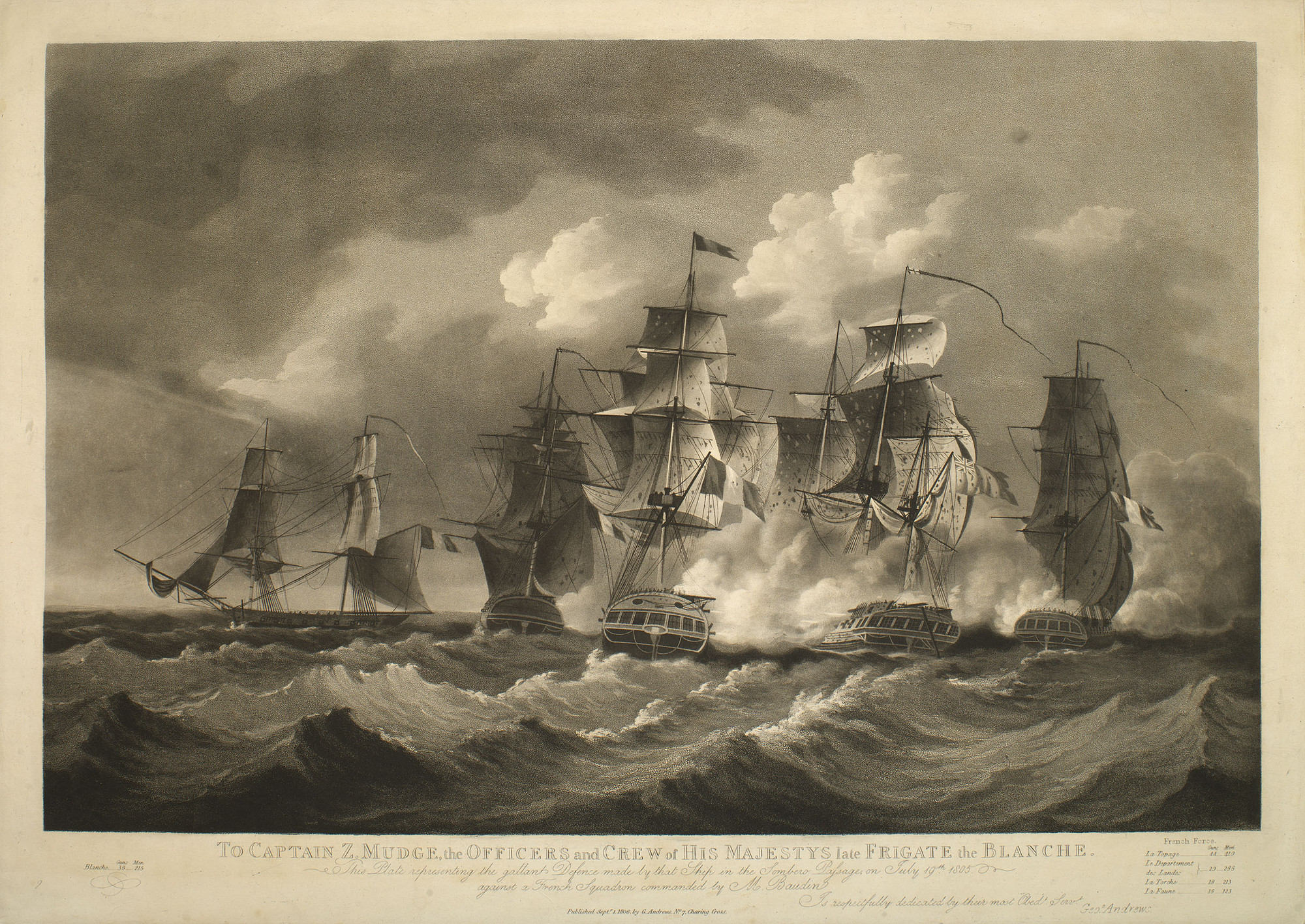
Attack on HMS Blanche by a squadron of French ships in the Sombrero Passage, 19 July 1805. Napoleonic Wars (1803–15).

On 27 November 1796, the French warships Décius and Vaillante landed 400 Frenchmen at Rendezvous Bay under Victor Hugues. These were able to destroy the villages at South Hill and The Valley, but the local British regrouped on the Long Path before Sandy Hill Fort. The frigate HMS Lapwing, sailing from St. Christopher under Captain Barton, was able to defeat the French ships and the assault again ended in failure. Hugues' attack was noticeably brutal, with several Anguillians being murdered and kidnapped. The landing also left many homes and buildings completely destroyed. This left the island in a bleak state, reeling for decades to come.

Attempts were made from the early days of the colony to develop Anguilla into a plantation-based economy employing enslaved Africans, but the island's soil and climate were unfavourable and the plantations were largely unsuccessful. Despite this, slaves in Anguilla were not immune to the atrocities and injustices of chattel slavery common during era of enslavement in the West Indies, as slaves were still subject to brutal punishment, forced labour and ill-treatment at the hands of their masters. The lack of successful large-scale plantations and a formal colonization akin to neighbouring islands led to limited oversight, poor colonial communication and improper judicial administration. These factors made the island synonymous with piracy and crime, garnering Anguilla with an unlawful reputation. This also paved the way for many cases of slave abuse on the island and made it difficult to impose a judgement on a slave owner. Anguilla's population is estimated to have fallen from a peak of around 10,000 to just 2000. In 1819, there were 360 Europeans, 320 free Africans, and 2451 slaves. Several mixed-race mulatto slaves that were children of their masters were often willed freedom and in some cases willed land. In addition to the mulatto class of manumissions, there were cases of Anguillian slaves and aprentices being rented for their labour to other islands and using the compensation to purchase their freedom and plots of land for paltry sums, as the land was often seen as fruitless by their previous masters. The Slave Trade Act of 1807 caused an influx of fugitive slaves from nearby Saint Martin and made it difficult for planters to move and sell slaves, as they often had land and familial ties in both islands. These fugitive slaves often intermixed with the domestic black populations. The intermixing combined with the increasingly perilous situation in Anguilla, caused many non-foreign slaves to run away themselves, ironically, often to Saint Martin, with both islands hosting noticeable amounts of each other's runaway slaves. In 1816 following the dissolusion of the Leeward Islands, Anguilla was placed in a union with Saint Kitts, Nevis and The British Virgin Islands, with Saint Kitts being the headquarters. The new union, led to increased oversight and attempts to reform the judicial system, much to the chagrin of Anguillian planters. There were droughts and famines in the 1830s and 1840s. These periods of drought and famine exacerbated the already existing destitution, leading to widespread poverty, crop failure, economic hardship, and suffering on the island. The drought periods gave way to even more lawlessness and administrative failure. As a result, theft, assault, and smuggling became abundant as a means of survival, especially amongst the slaves, later turned apprenticed labourers. Amidst the turmoil, slaveowners couldn't afford to feed or clothe their slaves, leading many of the enslaved to become more insubordinate and refuse to work. It also caused slaves to abscond from their estates at a higher rate. In March of 1831, the free black and coloured class petitioned for equal treatment; however, this was dismissed by the white ruling class, with the foreman of the jury claiming that it would lead to a white exodus. The British abolished slavery in their colonies during the 1830s. During the early years of abolition and the period leading up to the decree, several slave owners and planters illicitly removed black Anguillians off-island to be sold in neighboring islands that still practiced slavery to minimize financial losses. Emancipation increased the number of runaway slaves to Anguilla from the neighbouring French and Dutch islands, who were yet to be freed. While many plantation owners returned to Europe, or migrated to other parts of the Americas, the freedmen continued to eke out a living on Anguilla as subsistence farmers and fishermen.

The British government attempted to send the entire population of the island to Demerara in British Guiana (modern Guyana) but most remained. In the 19th century, the large lake in the center of the island was exploited for salt exported to the United States; around 3,000,000 bushels were produced each year. This formed the island's principal trade, although sugar, cotton, and tobacco were also produced.

In 1871, Anguilla was forced into a federation with St Kitts; the next year, the islands petitioned the British colonial office to permit separate and direct rule. Around this time, the population had risen to 3000. In 1882, Nevis was added. The population had risen to 3890 by the time of the First World War. By that time, charcoal production had essentially deforested the entire island, but the expanded pastureland permitted export of cattle to Saint Thomas. Phosphate of lime was also produced.

It was not until 1951 that Anguilla had a greater say in its administration, the British colony of Saint Christopher-Nevis-Anguilla, itself part of the Federal Colony of the Leeward Islands. Between 1958 and 1962, the tri-state was part of the West Indies Federation.

== Modern Anguilla ==
Flag of St Christopher Nevis Anguilla

On 27 February 1967 (59 years ago), Britain granted the territory of Saint Christopher-Nevis-Anguilla the status of "associated state", with its own constitution and a considerable degree of self-government. Many Anguillans strenuously objected to the continuing political subservience to Saint Kitts, and on 30 May 1967 (known as "Anguilla Day"), the Kittian police were evicted from the island. The provisional government requested United States administration, which was declined. On 11 July 1967 a referendum on Anguilla's secession from the fledgling state was held. The results were 1,813 votes for secession and 5 against. A separate legislative council was immediately declared. Peter Adams served as the first Chairman of the Anguilla Island Council. After eight days of negotiation on Barbados, on 31 July, Adams agreed to return Anguilla to the Anguilla–St Kitts–Nevis federation, in exchange for granting Anguilla limited self-rule similar to that enjoyed by Nevis. Adams agreed to support this pact in principle, but the Council rejected it, replacing Adams as chairman with Ronald Webster. In December, two members of Britain's Parliament worked out an interim agreement by which for one year a British official would exercise basic administrative authority along with the Anguilla Council. Tony Lee took the position in January 1968, but by the end of the term no agreement have been reached on the long-term future of the island's government.

On 7 February 1969 Anguilla held a second referendum resulting in a vote of 1,739 to 4 against returning to association with Saint Kitts. At this point Anguilla declared itself an independent republic, with Webster again serving as chairman. A new British envoy, William Whitlock, arrived on 11 March 1969 with a proposal for a new interim British administration. He was quickly expelled. On 19 March 1969, a contingent of 2nd Battalion, the Parachute Regiment, and 40 Metropolitan Police officers peacefully landed on the island, ostensibly to "restore order". That autumn the troops left and Army engineers were brought in to improve the public works. Tony Lee returned as Commissioner and in 1971 worked out another "interim agreement" with the islanders. Effectively Anguilla was allowed to secede from Saint Kitts and Nevis, receiving its first constitution on 12 February 1976. It was not until 19 December 1980 that Anguilla was formally disassociated from Saint Kitts to become a separate British dependency by the Anguilla Act 1980. While Saint Kitts and Nevis went on to gain full independence from Britain in 1983, Anguilla still remains a British overseas territory.

In recent years Anguilla has become an up-market tourist destination, and tourism is one of the mainstays of the economy. Fishing is another important economic activity, and a financial services sector is also being developed. The modern population of Anguilla is largely of African descent, with a minority having European (mainly English) ancestry.

== See also ==
- Republic of Anguilla
- History of the Caribbean
- History of the Americas
