= Louis-André Senez =

Louis-André Senez (19 April 1761 – 8 November 1836) was a French Navy officer who served during the French Revolutionary and Napoleonic Wars.

== Biography ==
Senez was born to a family of bakers. He started sailing in the French Royal Navy in 1774 as a boy, serving on the corvette Flèche, the frigates Flore and Sultane, and the ship of the line Tonnant in 1778. He took part in the Battle of Grenada.

Senez was then employed in the merchant navy and on various privateers. On 3 February 1794, he joined the Navy of the Republic as an Enseigne de vaisseau non entretenu on the fluyt Dordogne in a squadron under Captain Leissègues, tasked with retaking Guadeloupe from the British. On 11 July 1794, he was given command of Fort de l'Union at Guadeloupe.

Promoted to Lieutenant on 8 October 1794, he was appointed to the command of corvette Décius. In November 1796, Décius, Vaillante, and three schooners sailed for a raid on British-held Anguilla. On 27 November, HMS Lapwing intercepted the flotilla, destroying Vaillante and capturing Décius, only to scuttle her the next day to escape two French frigates.

Freed by 2 January 1798, Senez was promoted to Commander (Capitaine de frégate) and given command of Vénus. On 9 October 1799, Senez transferred to the corvette Berceau. On 13 July 1800, Berceau engaged two Portuguese corvettes and five Letters or Marque, sinking one corvette and capturing four of the privateers. He fought a notable action against USS Boston on 13 October 1800, where he was taken prisoner.

Returned from America, Senez was promoted to Captain 2nd class on 24 September 1803 and given command of the frigate French frigate Cybèle (2). On 29 August, he was given command of the 74-gun Borée and fought in several campaigns, notably Ganteaume's expedition to Corfu and the Battle of Maguelone in October 1809. On 5 February 1804, he was made a Knight of the Legion of Honour, and on 14 June, promoted to Officer.

In January 1813, Senez was given command of Ville de Marseille. At the Bourbon Restoration, he was tasked with ferrying Duke Louis Philippe d'Orléans from Palermo to France. On 5 July 1815, he was made a Knight in the Order of Saint Louis.

Siding with Napoléon during the Hundred Days, Senez was given command of the frigate Dryade, and tasked with ferrying Letizia Ramolino, Joseph Fesch and Napoleon II to France. At the Second Bourbon Restauration, the Navy retired Senez, then reinstated him, but did not give him a command. He retired on 1 November 1817 with a pension, and died on 8 November 1836.
