= French ship Vaillant =

French ship Vaillant or Vaillante may refer to the following ships of the French Navy:

- French ship Vaillant (1755)
- French brig Vaillante (1793)
- French corvette Vaillante (1796)
- French ship Vaillant (1801)
