= Head (watercraft) =

Ship's toilet

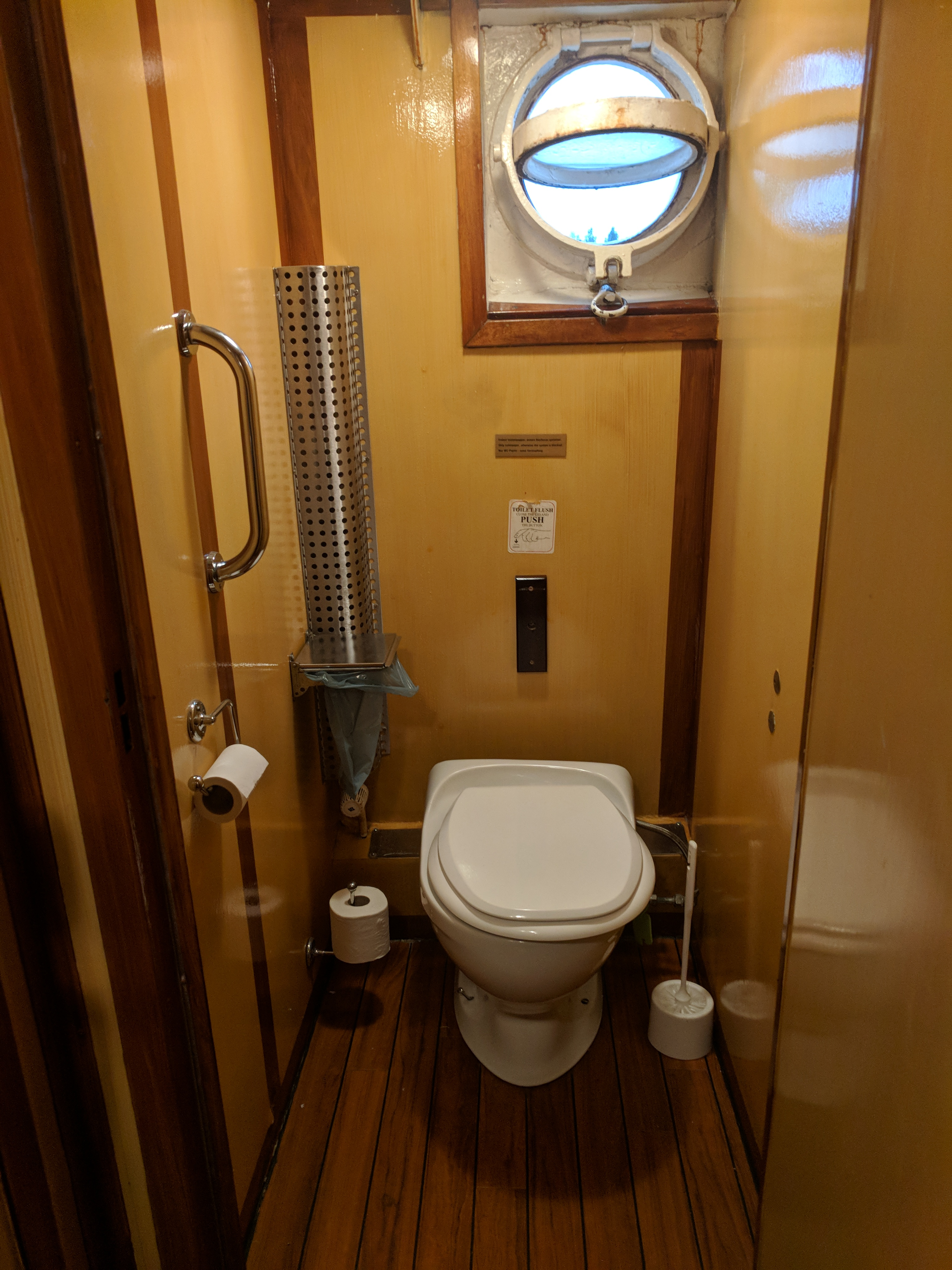
Toilet on M/S Diana, a Swedish passenger boat built in 1931

In sailing vessels, the head is the ship's toilet. The name derives from sailing ships in which the toilet area for the regular sailors was placed at the head or bow of the vessel.

== Design ==
In modern boats, the heads look similar to seated flush toilets but use a system of valves and pumps that brings seawater or fresh water into the toilet and discharges waste into a holding tank or out through the hull. In small boats the pump is often hand operated. The cleaning mechanism is easily blocked if too much toilet paper or other fibrous material is put down the pan. Electrically-pumped toilets are also available and more water-efficient, which can enable using fresh water to reduce odors and corrosion.

Discharge of sewage from boats is regulated by international agreements and national laws to reduce marine pollution, including the International Convention for the Prevention of Pollution from Ships and the United States Clean Water Act (see regulation of ship pollution in the United States). Marine sanitation devices treat, process, and store raw sewage. Modern boats commonly have a holding tank so that sewage can be stored and later discharged at a sanitary pumpout facility on shore or discharged into the sea at a legal distance from shore.

== History ==
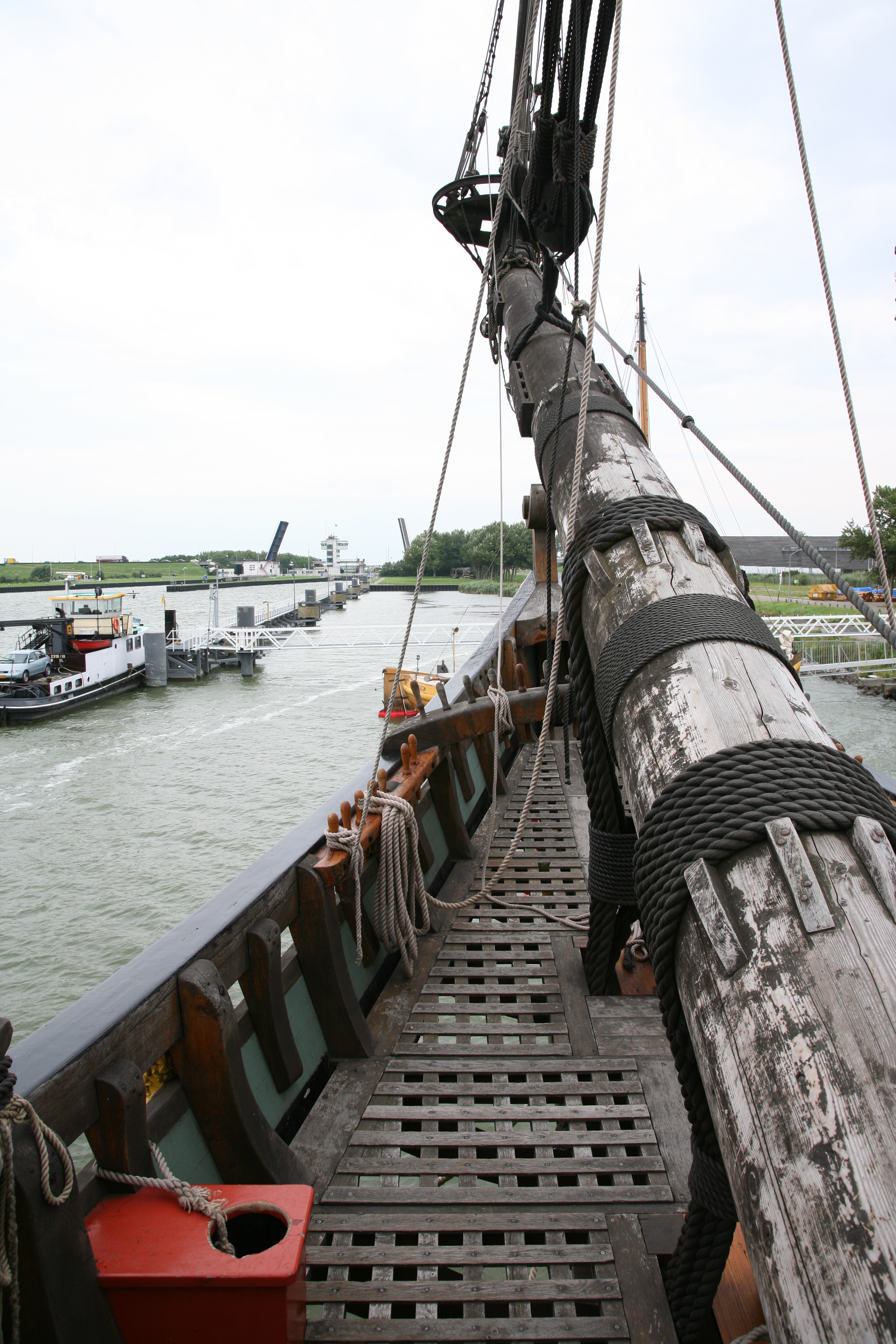
Head on a replica of the Batavia, a ship built in Amsterdam in 1628

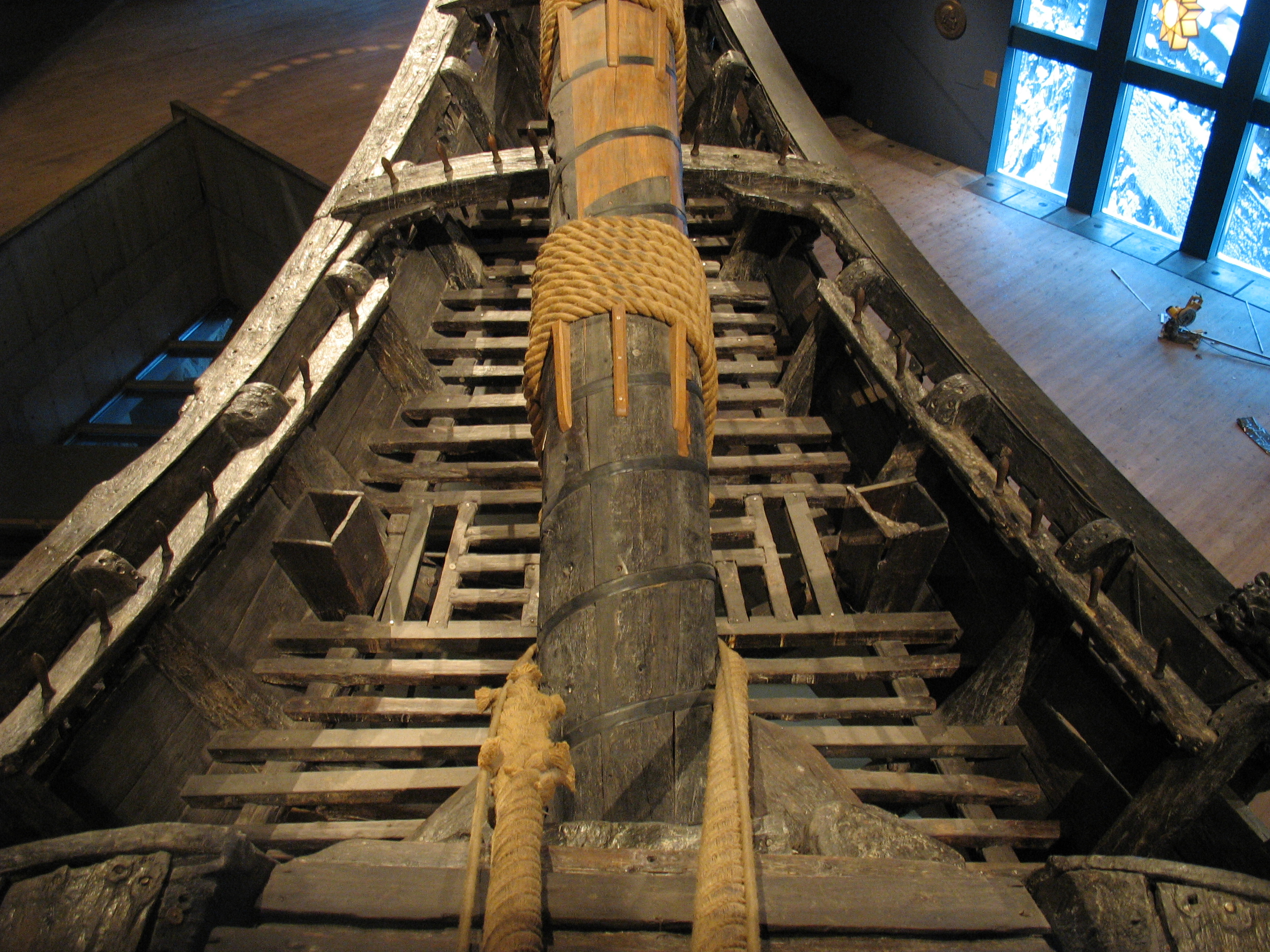
The head on the beakhead of the 17th-century warship Vasa. The toilets are the two square box-like structures on either side of the bowsprit. On the starboard side, there are still minor remnants of the original seat.

By the late 17th century, sailing ships were typically built with latrines, called "seats of ease" or "seats of easement", in the form of openings in the bow fitted with discharge pipes that led to the sea. The captain and officers had more private toilets at the stern of the ship in the quarter galleries, although the mechanism was the same. During the era when all hands aboard a vessel were men, the heads received most of their use for defecation; for routine urination, a pissdale was easier to access and simpler to use. Officers also used chamber pots.

18th century naval ships had similar facilities, although by the 1790s some ships may have had a few flush toilets. The journal of Aaron Thomas aboard HMS Lapwing in the Caribbean Sea in the 1790s records that a canvas tube was attached, presumably by the ship's sailmaker, to a superstructure beside the bowsprit near the figurehead, ending just above the normal waterline.

=== Submarines ===
Submarine heads face the problem that at greater depths higher water pressure makes it harder to pump the waste out through the hull. As a result, early systems could be complicated, with the head fitted to the United States Navy S-class submarine being described as almost taking an engineer to operate. Making a mistake resulted in waste or seawater being forcibly expelled back into the hull of the submarine. This caused the loss of German submarine U-1206. The toilet on the World War I British E-class submarine was considered so poor by the captain of HMS E35 that he preferred the crew to wait to relieve themselves until the submarine surfaced at night. As a result, many submarines only used the heads as an extra storage space for provisions.

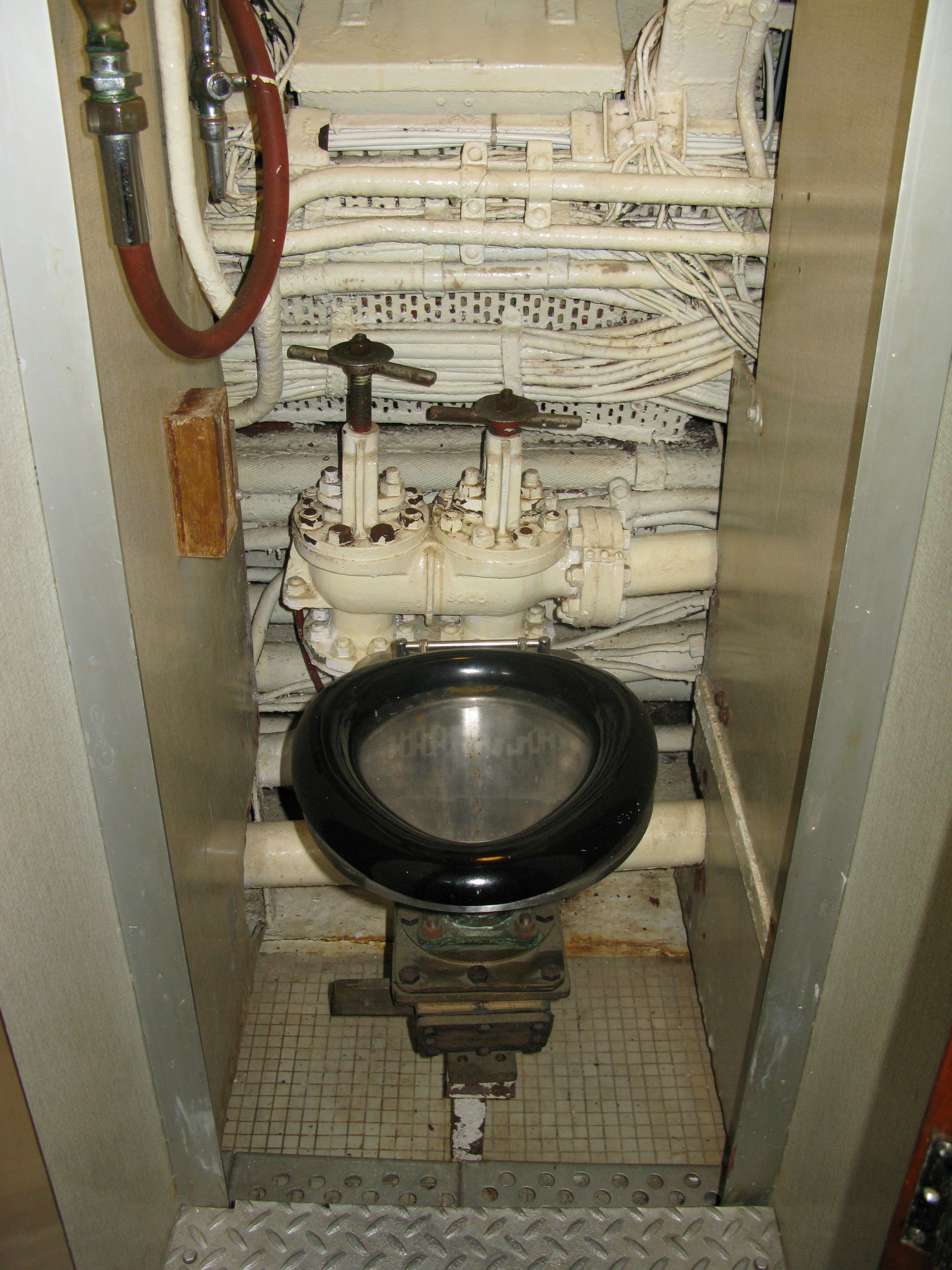
Head in British submarine HMS Alliance (c.1945–1973)

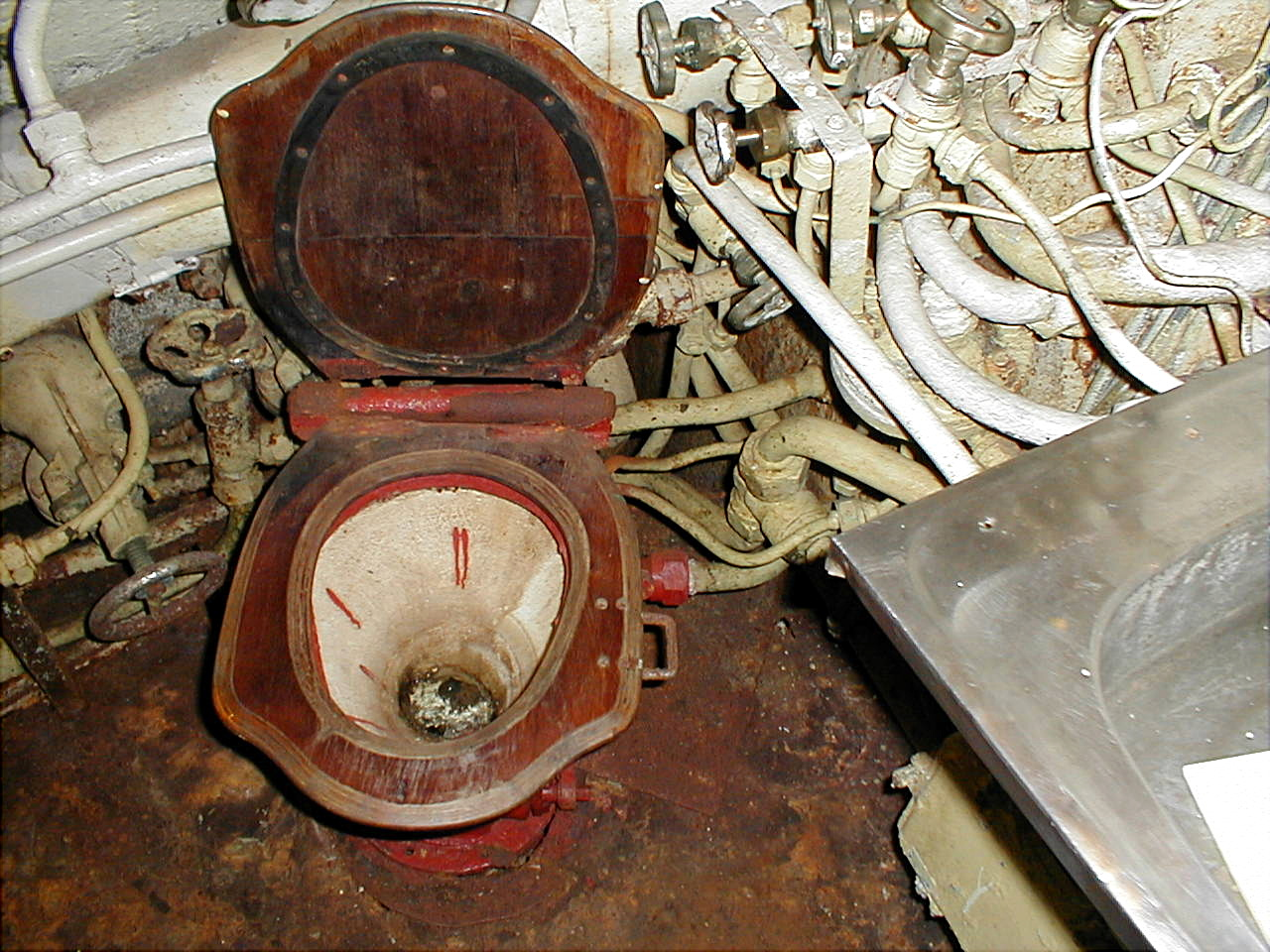
Head in Soviet submarine of the Foxtrot class (c.1957–1983)

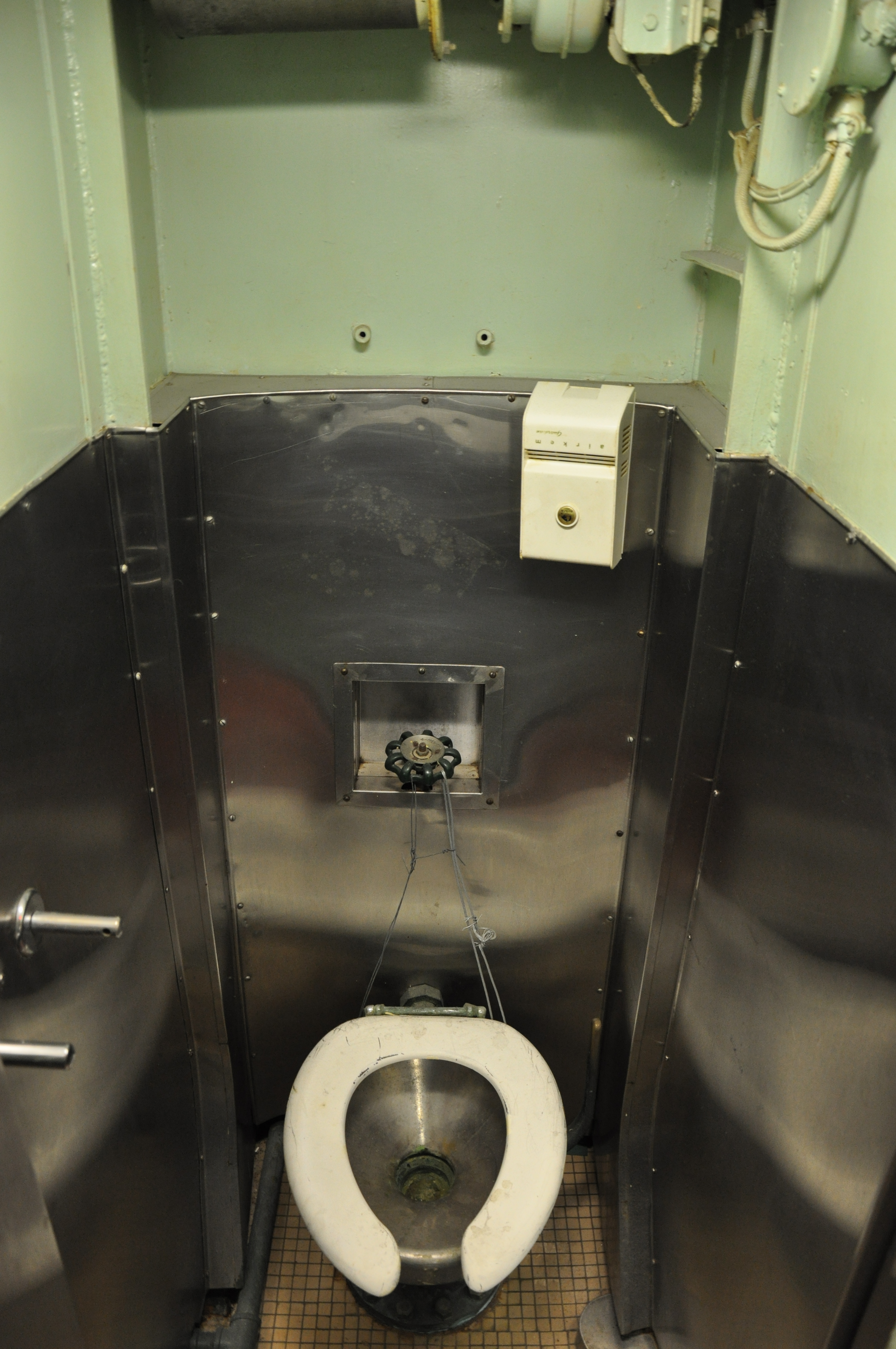
Head in submarine USS Growler (mid-1950s)
