= USS Boston (1799) =

Three-masted frigate of the United States Navy

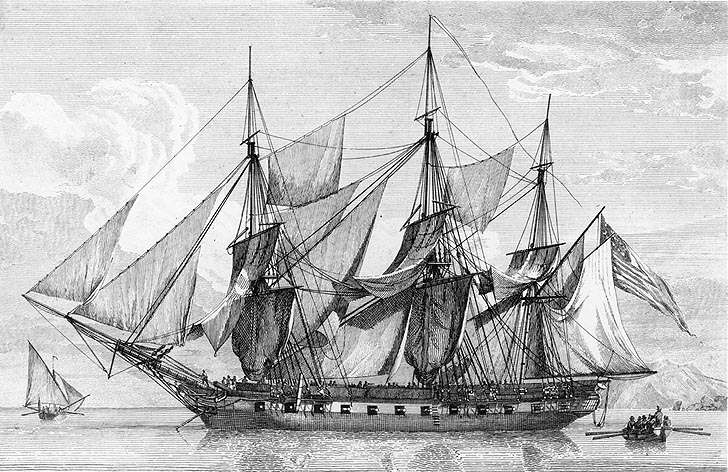
- An engraving of USS Boston in the Mediterranean circa 1802

History

United States
- Name: USS Boston
- Namesake: Boston, Massachusetts
- Builder: Edmund Hartt
- Cost: $119,570
- Launched: 20 May 1799
- Commissioned: 1799
- Fate: Burned, 24 August 1814

General characteristics
- Type: Frigate
- Tonnage: 700 tons displacement 400 tons
- Length: 134 ft (41 m)
- Beam: 34 ft 6 in (10.52 m)
- Draft: 11 ft 6 in (3.51 m)
- Propulsion: Sail
- Speed: 9.2 knots (17.0 km/h; 10.6 mph)
- Complement: 220 officers and enlisted
- Armament: 24 × 12-pounder guns; 8 × 9-pounder guns

The third USS Boston was a 32-gun wooden-hulled, three-masted frigate of the United States Navy. Boston was built by public subscription in Boston under the Act of 30 June 1798. Boston was active during the Quasi-War with France and the First Barbary War. On 12 October 1800, Boston engaged and captured the French corvette Berceau. Boston was laid up in 1802, and considered not worth repairing at the outbreak of the War of 1812. She was burned at the Washington Naval Yard on 24 August 1814 to prevent her capture by British forces.

== Design and construction ==
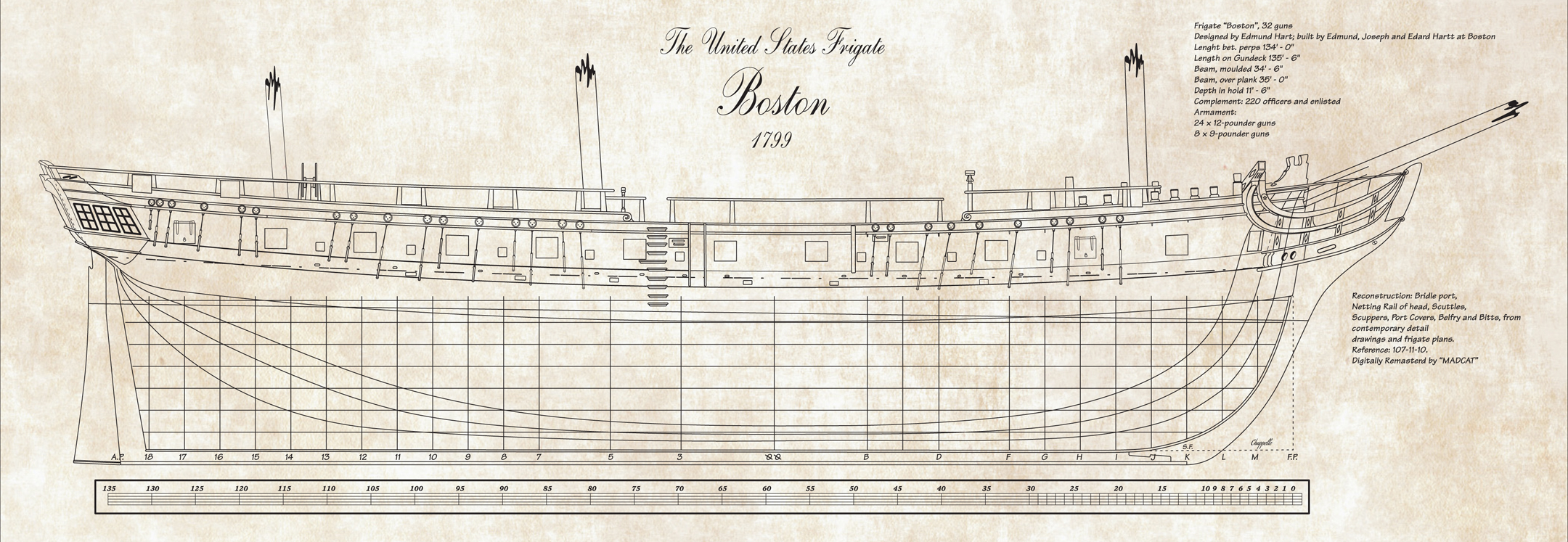
USS Boston

Boston was designed and constructed by Edmund Hartt at Boston, Massachusetts. Boston was authorized by the Naval Act of 1798 funded by the donations from the people of Boston, Massachusetts as part of the group of ships built by the states to supplement the Original six frigates of the United States Navy provided by the Naval Act of 1794.

The frigate had a displacement of 400 tons and a length between perpendiculars of 134 feet (41 m). She was originally armed with twenty-four 9-pounder and eight 6-pounder guns, and carried a complement of 220 officers and men. She was launched on 20 May 1799 and commissioned soon afterwards, Captain George Little in command.

== Service history ==
Her first captain was George Little. Boston cruised in the West Indies (July 1799 – June 1800) protecting American commerce against French privateers. On 7 November she captured a French barge, of piratical nature that had just captured a French sloop, the sloop/cutter "Le Garde Le Pelican" was then captured by Norfolk. On 17 November stopped a schooner with questionable papers and put a prize master on board and sent her in to Cape Francois for verification. In company with USS General Greene, on 1 December 1799 she recaptured Danish brig "Flying Fish", captured by André Rigaud's barges, but with questionable crewing and other oddities (possibly French owned), and assisted in the recapture of the American schooner Weymouth the next day, which had been captured by French privateer Hope. Shortly after that she encountered French Navy corvette Diligente, but took no action as she was convoying troops of General Toussaint for the Haitian Revolution, seemingly carrying a US pass.

On 27 January 1800 she captured letter of marque Les Deux Anges. On 2 March she captured a small boat that was taken into Port Republican and sold. On 4 March off Cape Tiburon she seized cash from French sloop La Fortune and let her go. On 11 March engaged 9 French barges, disabling 2 and sinking 3 of them. On 26 March she captured French sloop Le Heureux off Cape Tiburon, Hispaniola, she was sunk on 2 April, being old and leaky. On 9 June, off Gonaives, she captured Danish flagged schooner and sent her for examination as suspected trading with the enemy. On 24 June, in company with USS Augusta, captured a French brig.

On 25 June 1800, she departed Cape Tiburon for Boston via Havana, Cuba. She was at Boston by late July. She cruised along the American coast until departing Boston 19 September when she sailed to the Guadeloupe Station in the West Indies. In 22°52′N 52°56′W, on 12 October 1800, she engaged and captured the French corvette Berceau. Boston lost seven killed and eight wounded in the encounter. She towed her prize to Boston, arriving in Nantasket Roads on 15 November. During her West Indian cruises, Boston captured seven additional prizes (two in conjunction with USS General Greene).

On 4 March 1801 Boston departed from Boston. She returned to Nantaskett Roads on 27 May 1801. On 2 July 1801 Captain Daniel McNeil was ordered to take command. On 6 September 1801 she departed Boston for New York. She departed from New York on 28 October carrying Minister Livingston to Lorient, France. She arrived at Toulon, France 10 January 1802, departing for Tripoli on 19 January. She then joined the Mediterranean Squadron off Tripoli. She fought an action with six or seven Tripolitanian gunboats on 16 May 1802, forcing one ashore. Boston returned to Boston in October 1802 and then proceeded to Washington arriving 27 October where she was laid up. Considered not worth repairing on the outbreak of the War of 1812, she remained at Washington until 24 August 1814 when she was burned to prevent her falling into British hands.

== See also ==
- List of sailing frigates of the United States Navy
