= French ship Ville de Marseille (1812) =

Ship of the line of the French Navy

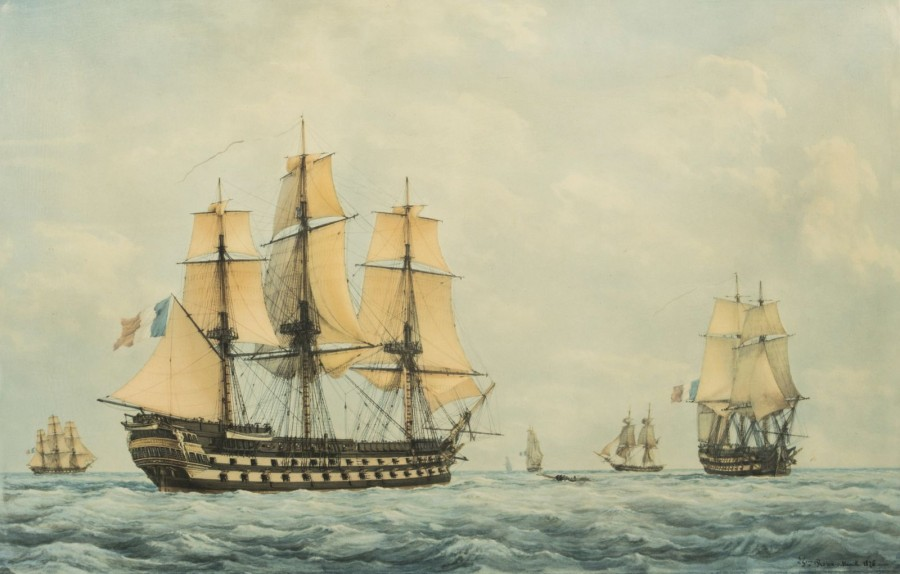
- Watercolour by François Roux

History

France
- Name: Ville de Marseille
- Namesake: Marseille
- Ordered: 18 February 1811
- Builder: Arsenal de Toulon
- Laid down: 27 June 1811
- Launched: 15 August 1812
- Commissioned: 17 November 1812
- Stricken: 22 June 1858
- Fate: Broken up in Toulon in 1877

General characteristics
- Class & type: Téméraire-class ship of the line
- Displacement: 3,069 tonneaux
- Tons burthen: 1,537 port tonneaux
- Length: 55.87 m (183 ft 4 in)
- Beam: 14.46 m (47 ft 5 in)
- Draught: 7.15 m (23.5 ft)
- Depth of hold: 7.15 m (23 ft 5 in)
- Sail plan: Full-rigged ship
- Crew: 705
- Armament: 74 guns: Lower gun deck: 28 × 36 pdr guns; Upper gun deck: 30 × 18 pdr guns; Forecastle and Quarterdeck: 16–28 × 8 pdr guns and 36 pdr carronades

Ville de Marseille was a 74-gun Téméraire-class ship of the line built for the French Navy during the 1810s. Completed in 1812, she played a minor role in the Napoleonic Wars.

== Description ==
Designed by Jacques-Noël Sané, the Téméraire-class ships had a length of 55.87 metres (183 ft 4 in), a beam of 14.46 metres (47 ft 5 in) and a depth of hold of 7.15 metres (23 ft 5 in). The ships displaced 3,069 tonneaux and had a mean draught of 7.15 metres (23 ft 5 in). They had a tonnage of 1,537 port tonneaux. Their crew numbered 705 officers and ratings during wartime. They were fitted with three masts and ship rigged.

The muzzle-loading, smoothbore armament of the Téméraire class consisted of twenty-eight 36-pounder long guns on the lower gun deck and thirty 18-pounder long guns on the upper gun deck. After about 1807, the armament on the quarterdeck and forecastle varied widely between ships with differing numbers of 8-pounder long guns and 36-pounder carronades. The total number of guns varied between sixteen and twenty-eight. The 36-pounder obusiers formerly mounted on the poop deck (dunette) in older ships were removed as obsolete.

== Construction and career ==
Ville de Marseille was ordered on 18 February 1811 and laid down on 27 June at the Arsenal de Toulon. The ship was launched on 15 August 1812, commissioned on 17 November and was completed in December. In January 1813, Louis-André Senez was given command of Ville de Marseille. At the Bourbon Restoration in 1814, she was tasked with ferrying Duke Louis Philippe d'Orléans from Palermo to France.

In 1824–1825, she was upgraded to 80 guns. The next year, she took part in operations in Eastern Mediterranean under Captain Cuvillier. Ville de Marseille took part in the Invasion of Algiers in 1830 as a troop ship. The next year, she took part in the Battle of the Tagus under Captain Baron Lasusse. In 1835 and 1836, she ferried troops to Algeria, before being refitted in 1841. Ville de Marseille took part in the Crimean War as a troopship, and in the Bombardment of Sevastopol. As one of the oldest ships in the navy, she was sent back to France in late 1854. She was used as a barracks hulk from 1858, and eventually broken up in Toulon in 1877.

1/24-scale model of Ville de Marseille, on display at the maritime museum of Marseille
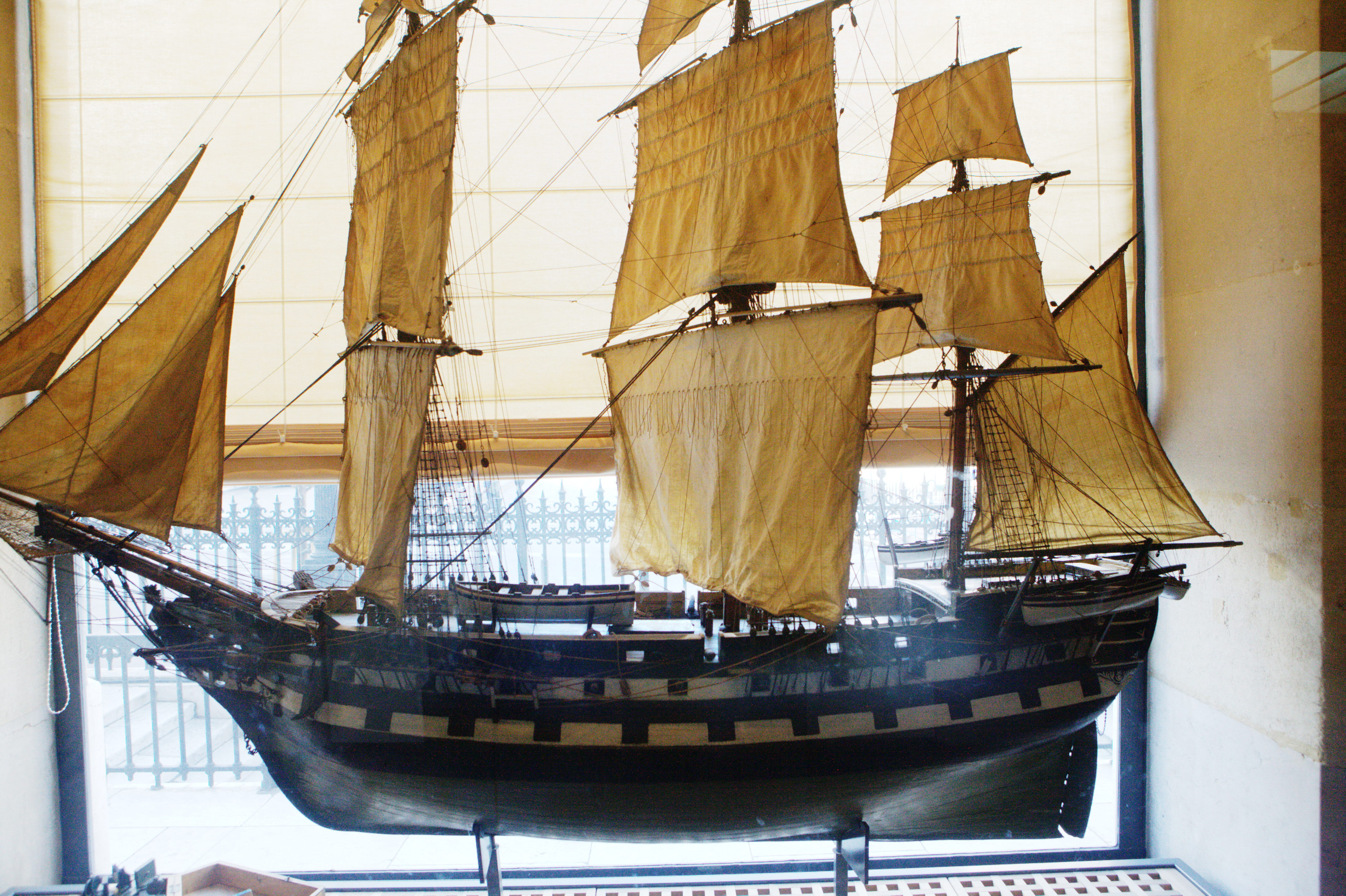

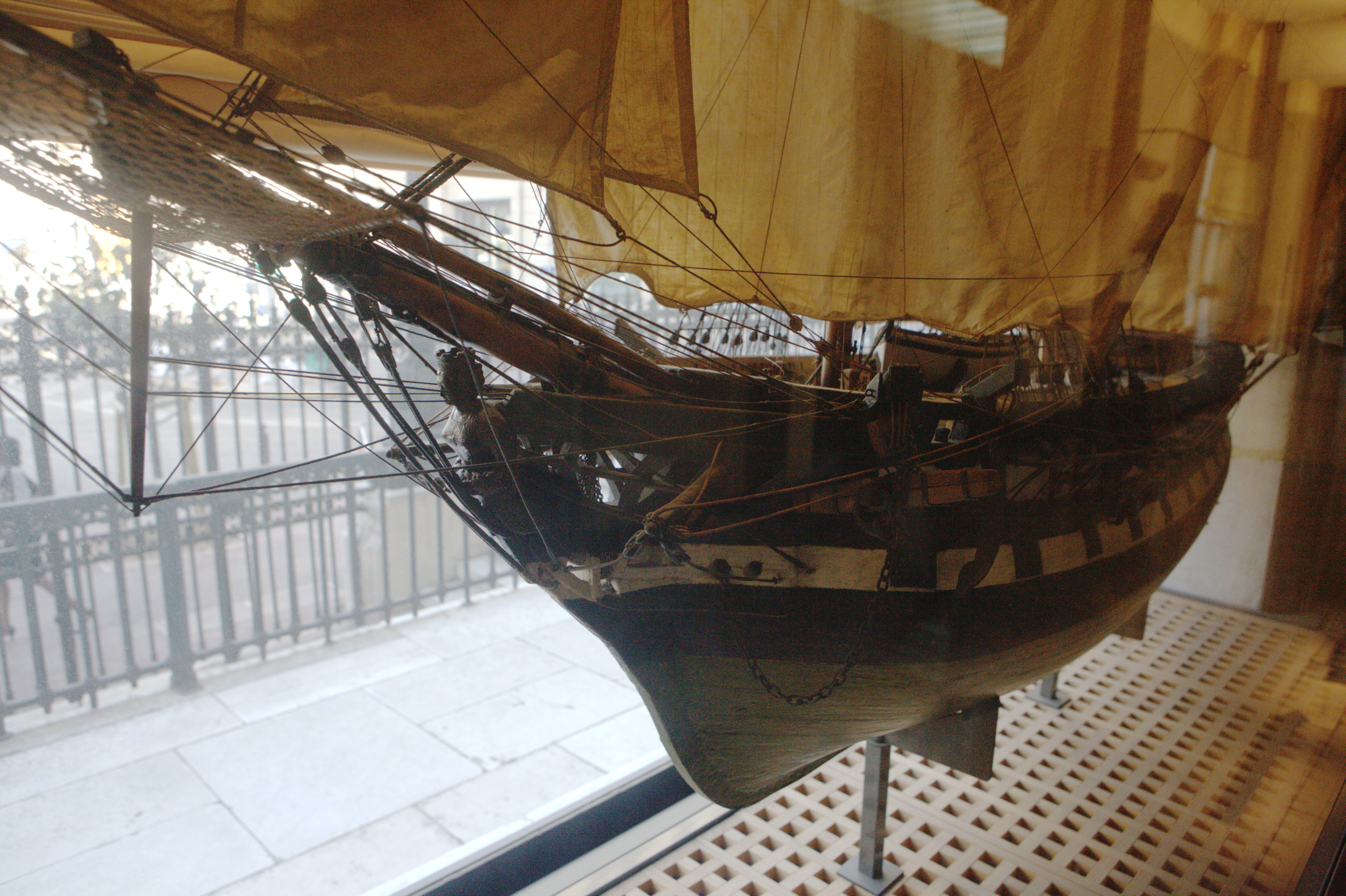

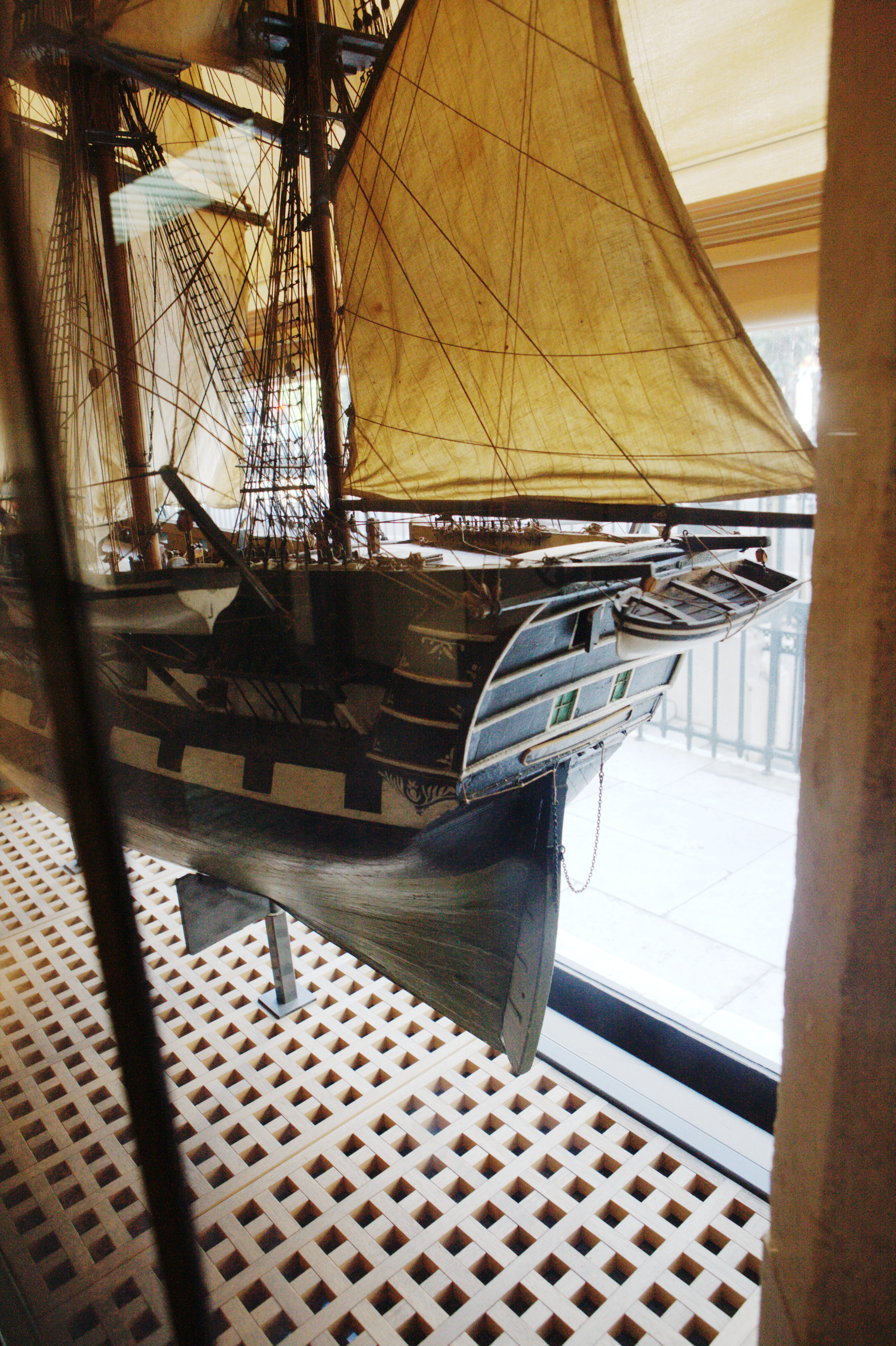

== Bibliography ==
- Quintin, Danielle; Quintin, Bernard (2003). Dictionnaire des capitaines de Vaisseau de Napoléon (in French). S.P.M. p. 341. ISBN 2-901952-42-9.
- Roche, Jean-Michel (2005). Dictionnaire des bâtiments de la flotte de guerre française de Colbert à nos jours [Dictionary of French Warships from Colbert to Today]. Vol. 1: 1671-1870. Roche. ISBN 978-2-9525917-0-6. OCLC 165892922.
- Winfield, Rif and Roberts, Stephen S. (2015) French Warships in the Age of Sail 1786-1861: Design, Construction, Careers and Fates. Seaforth Publishing. ISBN 978-1-84832-204-2
