= Pissdale =

Urinal on 17th-century and later ships

A pissdale (also written piss-dale and piss dale) is a lead basin or trough that was fitted to the insides of the bulwarks on sailing ships which served as a urinal for the men aboard these ships. The pissdale was a 17th-century engineering development: prior to this, crewmen either used buckets or, more frequently, simply urinated over the rails of the ship (though this put them at risk of falling overboard and drowning, as few sailors had any ability to swim). They were akin to a seat of ease, a euphemism for a sitting toilet which was located in the beakhead.
