= USS Boston vs Berceau =

- Part of the Quasi-War
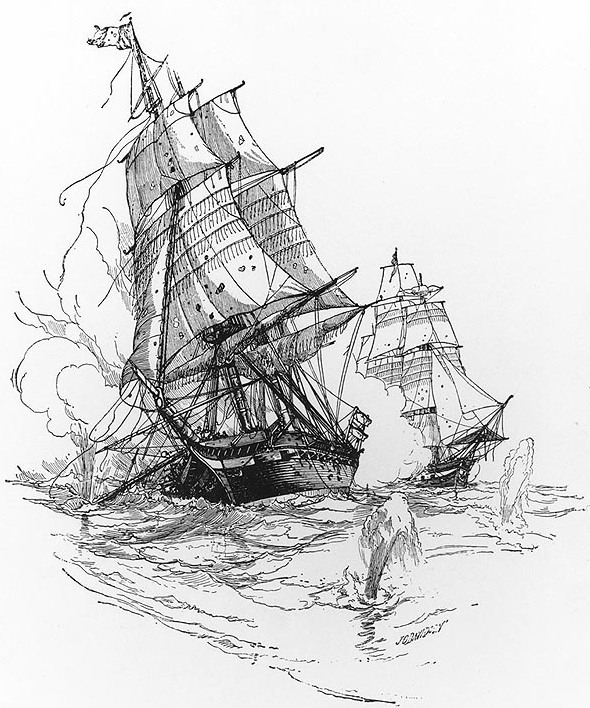
Date	12 October 1800
Location	off Guadeloupe
Result	American victory

Belligerents
United States	(French First Republic) France

Commanders and leaders
George Little	(France) Louis-André Senez

Strength
1 Frigate; 220 Marines and Sailors; 32 guns	1 Corvette; 180 Marines and Sailors; 24 guns

Casualties and losses
7 killed 8 wounded 1 frigate damaged	50–80 killed 18 wounded 82–112 prisoners 1 corvette captured French Claim: 4 killed 17 wounded

The Action between the USS Boston and Berceau, was a single ship action off Guadeloupe, during the Quasi-War with France. USS Boston (32 guns), Capt. George Little, captured the French corvette Berceau, capitaine de frégate Louis-André Senez. Cruising 600 miles northeast of Guadeloupe in the morning of 12 October, Boston, spotted two vessels that by 8:00 A.M. were determined to be warships, a schooner (not identified) and the 24-gun Berceau, which then headed in different directions.

Pursuing the latter, Boston gained steadily before catching her in the late afternoon (the American report gives the time as 4:30 P.M., French 3:30 P.M.). Berceau then shortened sail and the two began a stubborn engagement, each trying to wreck the spars, sails and rigging of the other until the damage to the tops of both made them unmanageable and they drifted apart. The crews then spent the next several hours repairing their damage so that they could rejoin the fight. Well after dusk, the two were again able to engage (the French report gives an additional intermediate engagement), which they did for more than an hour. The action was finally terminated (American, 10:20 P.M.; French 11:30 P.M.) when, losing her fore and main mast and already having had boarding attempts repulsed, Berceau was forced to strike her colors.

Following several days spent immobile, repairing spars, sails and rigging, Boston towed Berceau under prize-master Robert Haswell to its namesake home port of Boston. On arrival, it was discovered that the action had actually been fought two weeks after a peace agreement had formally ended hostilities. As a consequence Berceau was repaired at American expense and returned to France. The victory was also tainted by charges that the French officers had been plundered of their personal belongings and negro servants, with the active participation of most of their American counterparts. Acquitted in a resulting court martial proceeding, most of Boston's officers were nonetheless dismissed from the Navy.
