= French corvette Berceau (1794) =

French corvette launched in 1794

Berceau
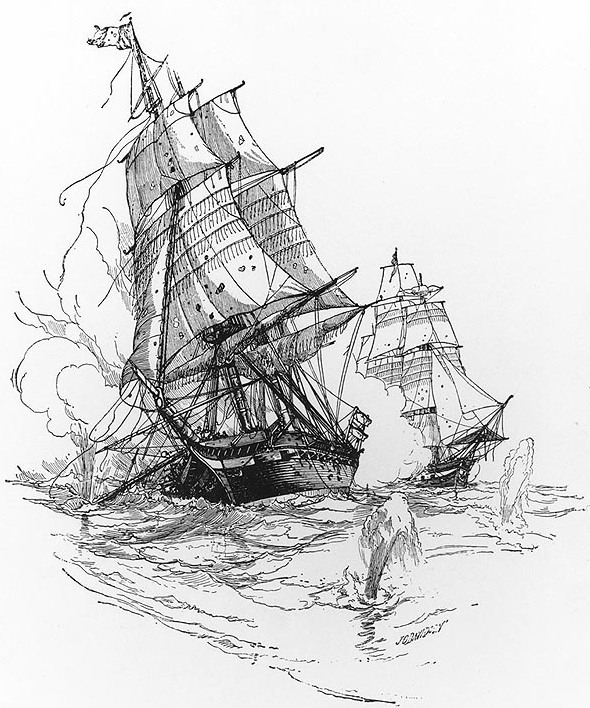

History

France
- Name: Berceau
- Builder: Lorient
- Laid down: December 1793
- Launched: 12 July 1794
- In service: July 1794
- Captured: 12 October 1800
- Fate: Broken up in 1804

General characteristics
- Displacement: 650 tons (French)
- Length: 33.45 m (109.7 ft)
- Beam: 9.1 m (30 ft)
- Draught: 4.6 m (15 ft)
- Propulsion: Sails
- Sail plan: Ship
- Complement: 180>
- Armament: Originally: 22 × 8-pounder guns; 1797: 2 × 36-pounder obusiers added; 1800:A further 6 × 36-pounder obusiers added

Berceau was a 22-gun corvette of the French Navy, built to a design by Jacques-Noël Sané, and launched in 1794. The Americans captured her in 1800 but restored her to France the next year. She then served in the Indian Ocean before returning to Spain, where she was broken up in 1804.

== Career ==
On 17 October 1794, Berceau was in the Île-d'Aix roads. Her commander was lieutenant de vaisseau Bonamy.

Berceau participated in the Croisière du Grand Hiver, an unsuccessful sortie by the French fleet at Brest on 24 December 1794.

On 18 September 1797, Berceau was at Saint-Nazaire and under the command of capitaine de frégate Bourrand. Between 21 May and 8 June 1799, she carried dispatches from Toulon to Malaga, and then returned to Palamós.

In 1799, Berceau took part in the Cruise of Bruix. On 11 May, Admiral Bruix set his flag on Berceau to direct a battle against the British off Cadiz; after the Spanish broke contact, Bruix cancelled the attack. On 9 October 1799, Commander (capitaine de frégate) Louis-André Senez took command of Berceau. On 15–16 November, she, with frigate "La Vengeance" weighed anchor at Île-d'Aix. The frigate was to transport three (Govt.?) agents to Guadeloupe. Anchored that evening in the roads of Chaix de Bois, leaving the next morning. On 11 December, she anchored at Basse-Terre, Guadeloupe, along with Vengeance, and the agents went ashore. On 15 December off loaded 500 rifles from France. Departed 1 January 1800.

Berceau captured Sarah Ann on 21 January 1800. On 3 February, the Antiguan privateer Peggy recaptured Sarah Ann. Peggy sent Sarah Ann into Antigua, where she was condemned in prize and sold. On 7 April, she captured American brig Delight, and on 8 April, captured American ship Industry (20°00′N 55°00′W), both captured crews were put on Delight and released. On 13 July 1800, Berceau engaged two Portuguese corvettes and five letters of marque, sinking one corvette and capturing four of the letters of marque. From September, she patrolled the Caribbean.

=== Capture by USS Boston ===
On 12 October 1800 Berceau met the 28-gun American frigate Boston; at the time neither vessel knew that the treaty that ended the Quasi-War had already been signed. In the ensuing engagement, Berceau was badly damaged and lost 34 men killed and 28 wounded before she eventually struck her colours. The Americans had four men killed, three men mortally wounded, and eight men wounded.

Berceau had been dismasted, so Boston towed her as a prize to Boston, arriving in Nantaskett Roads 15 November. During the voyage prize-master Lieutenant Robert Haswell rigged a jury mast and then sailed her on in an impressive feat of seamanship. The battle having been fought two weeks after a formal peace agreement, Berceau was repaired at American expense for $32,839.54. On 22 June 1801, she was restituted to France and recommissioned under Lieutenant Michelon. He then sailed her from Boston to Port-Louis, arriving around 19 October 1801.

=== Resumption of French career ===
She sailed from Saint-Pierre, Martinique, to Lorient. Between 29 March and 14 April Berceau was under the temporary command of lieutenant de vaisseau Emmanuel Halgan. Capitaine de frégate Brouard succeeded Halgan.

On 25 September 1803, under René Lemarant de Kerdaniel, Berceau joined up with Linois' squadron off Île de France, bringing the news that the War of the Third Coalition had broken out.

On 21 November the French frigate Sémillante and Berceau captured the large country ship Countess of Sutherland as she was sailing from Bengal to China with a cargo of cotton and rice. In December, Sémillante and Berceau sent their boats in to attack British vessels anchored at Pulo Bay, and burn the East India Company factory and naval arsenal there. (Note: Pulo Bay is a now silted-up natural harbor about eight miles southward of Benkulen.) Accounts differ, but the French succeeded in burning between six and twelve vessels.

In February 1804, Berceau took part in the Battle of Pulo Aura under capitaine de frégate Halgan. Afterwards, the captains of the French and Batavian Navy vessels involved, including Halgan, wrote reports on the incident.

== Fate ==
Berceau returned to Europe, reaching Vigo in August or September 1804, in bad condition. On 28 September Emperor Napoleon ordered her sold; she was decommissioned on 4 November and sold, for 21,000 piastres. (Note: Piastre was the French term for dollars. This would imply a price of £3,500, which seems implausibly high for a superannuated brig.)

== See also ==
- List of ships captured in the 19th century
- USS Boston vs Berceau
