= French corvette Décius (1795) =

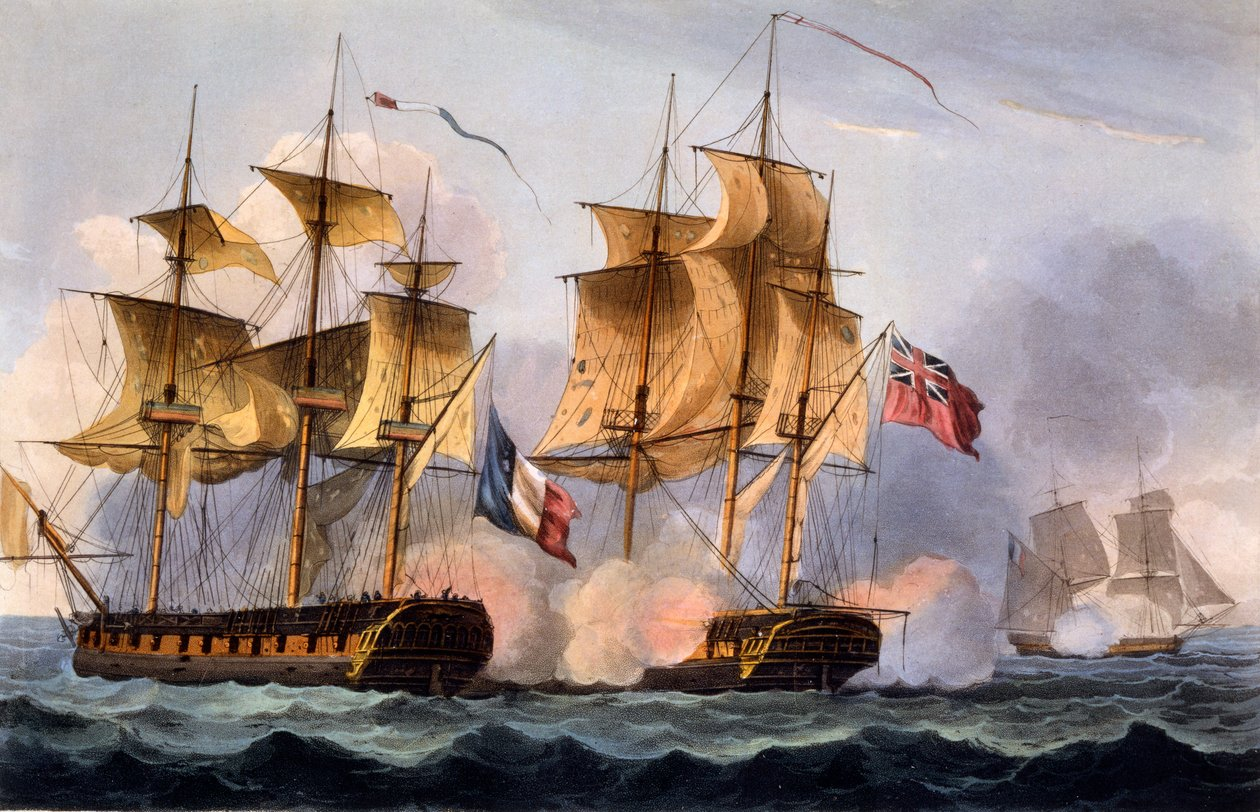
- Décius (left) engaging Lapwing, by Thomas Whitcombe

History

France
- Name: Décius
- Builder: Brest
- Laid down: August 1794
- Launched: 8 October 1795
- Commissioned: December 1795
- Fate: Destroyed 26 November 1796

General characteristics
- Class & type: Société populaire-class corvette
- Tons burthen: 300 (bm)
- Length: 35.08 m (115.1 ft)
- Beam: 8.93 m (29.3 ft)
- Depth of hold: 3.98 m (13.1 ft)
- Complement: 53
- Armament: Originally:16 × 6-pounder guns + 2 × 8-pounder long guns + 6 × British 18-pounder carronades; At capture:24 × 6-pounder guns + 2 × 12-pounder carronades

Décius was a Société populaire-class corvette launched in 1795 in Brest. Originally named Doucereuse, she was renamed to Décius in 1795. The British Royal Navy destroyed her in November 1796.

== Career ==
Décius was appointed to the Saint Martin station in 1796, under Lieutenant Louis-André Senez. On 27 November, she took part in the French invasion of Anguilla, along with the gun-brig Vaillante, and three schooners. In the raid, the French captured 21 ships and took 900 prisoners. Returning to Guadeloupe, the French flotilla encountered the frigate HMS Lapwing, under Captain R. Barton. Décius engaged Lapwing in order to cover the retreat of the weaker ships, and fought for two hours before striking her colours.

Lapwing then destroyed Vaillante, and took possession of Décius. Barton found that she had suffered about 80 men killed and 40 wounded. He took 170 prisoners. The next day two French frigates, Thétis and Pensée, chased Lapwing. Barton took the prisoners aboard Lapwing and set fire to Décius. Lapwing then returned to St Kitts.
