= HMS Lapwing (1785) =

Enterprise-class Royal Navy frigate

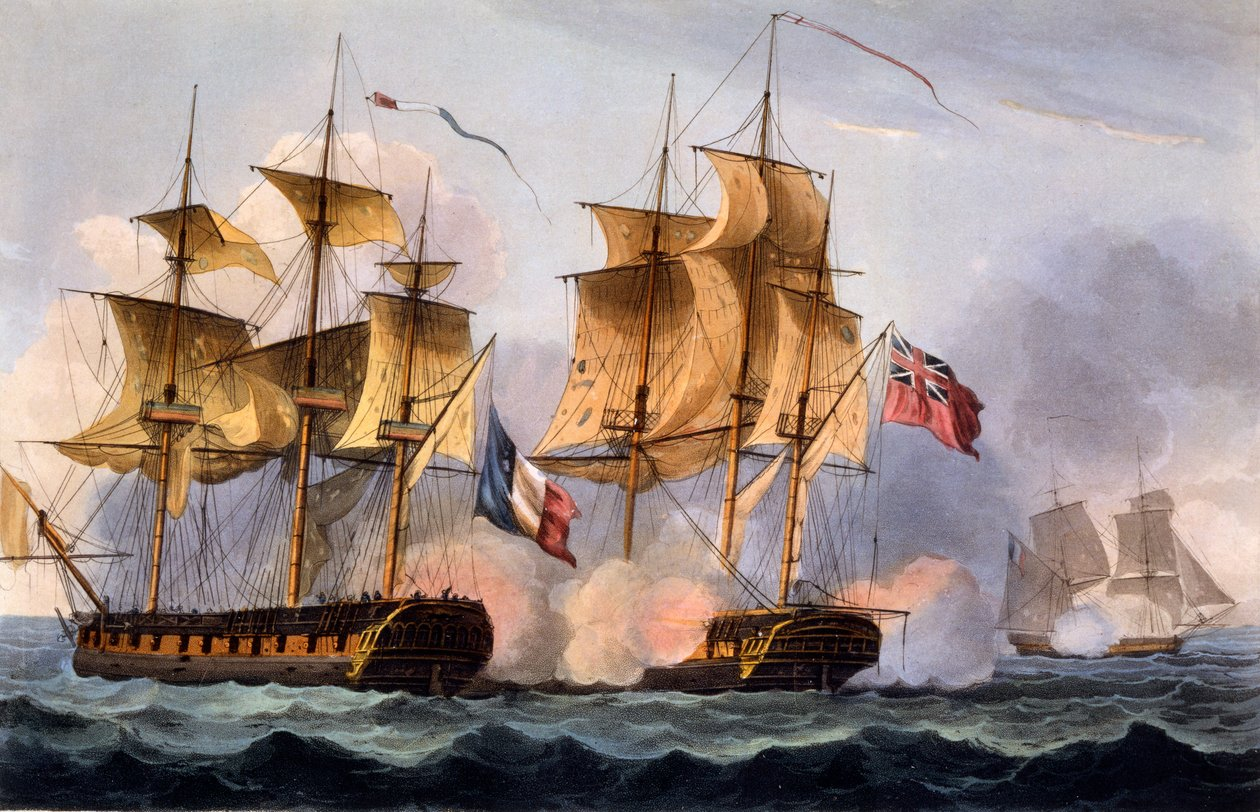
- Lapwing (right) engaging Décius, by Thomas Whitcombe

History

Great Britain
- Name: HMS Lapwing
- Ordered: 22 October 1782
- Builder: Thomas King, Dover
- Laid down: February 1783
- Launched: 21 September 1785
- Completed: 1787
- Commissioned: October 1790
- Honours and awards: Naval General Service Medal with clasp "Lapwing 3 Decr. 1796"
- Fate: Taken to pieces at Plymouth 31 May 1828

General characteristics
- Class & type: 28-gun Enterprise-class sixth-rate frigate
- Tons burthen: 59782/94 (bm)
- Length: 120 ft 6 in (36.73 m) (overall); 99 ft 4 1/2 in (30.290 m) (keel)
- Beam: 33 ft 8 in (10.3 m)
- Depth of hold: 11 ft 0 1/2 in (3.366 m)
- Sail plan: Full-rigged ship
- Complement: 200 officers and men
- Armament: Upper deck: 24 × 9-pounder guns; QD: 4 × 6-pounder guns + 4 × 18-pounder carronades; Fc: 2 × 18-pounder carronades; 12 × swivel guns

HMS Lapwing was a 28-gun Enterprise-class sixth-rate frigate of the Royal Navy.

== Career ==
Lapwing was first commissioned in October 1790 under the command of Captain Paget Bayly (or Bayley), who had commanded Scorpion off the coast of Africa and in the West Indies. Captain Henry Curzon recommissioned her in April 1791 and sailed for the Mediterranean on 12 July. She returned to Britain in 1793 and was paid off in February 1794.

Between May and November Lapwing underwent fitting at Woolwich. While this was underway, Captain Robert Barton commissioned her for cruising. He then sailed her to the Leeward Islands in October 1795.

=== Lapwing vs. Décius and Vaillante ===
On 25 November 1796, Captain R. Barton and Lapwing were at St Kitts when an express boat brought the news that a French force consisting of two warships, several smaller ships, and 400 troops, were threatening Anguilla. Contrary winds prevented Lapwing from arriving in time to prevent the French from burning the town. Still, Lapwing was able to meet the French force near St Martin's. There she was able to capture the French corvette Décius, and destroy the French brig Vaillante. In all, Lapwing captured 170 men. Décius was armed with twenty-four 6-pounder guns, two 12-pounder carronades, and two field pieces. She had a crew of 133 men, and was carrying 203 troops, all under the command of Citizen Andrée Senis. Vaillante was armed with four 24-pounder guns, had a crew of 45 men, and was carrying 90 troops, all under the command of Citizen Laboutique. Half an hour after Décius struck, Vaillante ran aground at St Martin's, where fire from Lapwing destroyed her.

Having destroyed Vaillante, Lapwing took possession of Décius. Barton found that she had suffered about 80 men killed and 40 wounded. He took 170 prisoners. The next day two French frigates, Thétis and Pensée, chased Lapwing. Barton took the prisoners aboard Lapwing and set fire to Décius. Lapwing then returned to St Kitts.

Barton further added that it was his understanding that all the troops were from "Victor Hughes" (Guadeloupe), picked expressly for the purpose of plundering and destroying the island. Many of the soldiers may have drowned in attempting to swim to shore.

The engagement cost Lapwing only one man killed (her pilot), and six men wounded. In 1847 the Admiralty awarded the Naval General Service Medal with clasp "Lapwing 3 Decr. 1796" to all surviving claimants from the action.

On 28 December, Lapwing was off Montserrat when she captured the French privateer Maria Topaze. Maria Topaze, of Guadeloupe, was armed with ten guns and had a crew of 47 men. During the chase she threw six of her guns overboard. She was one day out of St Eustatia.

== 1797 on ==
On 31 January 1797 Lapwing was sailing off Barbuda when she captured the French privateer schooner Espoir. Espoir was armed with four guns and ten swivel guns, and had a crew of 48 men. She was out of Guadeloupe and Lapwing sent her into St. Christopher's.

On 1 August Lapwing was off Tortola when she captured the French privateer sloop Regulus, of Puerto Rico Regulus, of four gun and 24 men, had been out 15 days and had captured an American brig. Lapwing sent her into St Christopher.

On 31 March 1798, Lapwing was off St Bartholomews when she captured the French privateer schooner Hardi. Hardi, of Guadeloupe, was armed with four guns and had a crew of 47 men. She had been out some time but had not made any captures. Lapwing sent Hardi into Martinique.

On 29 May Lapwing captured Intrepid, of 10 guns and 58 men, off Saint Bartholomew's. She had not made any captures since leaving Guadeloupe. (Note: Intrépide was a privateer commissioned in Guadeloupe in March 1798. French records state that Lapwing captured her in October 1798.)

March, 1799 she was commanded by Captain Thomas Harvey.

== Napoleonic Wars ==
On 17 July 1803 Lapwing, Falcon, and the hired armed cutter Queen Charlotte captured Caroline. Then on 28 July, the same three vessels recaptured from the French the brig Mercure, which apparently was British-built and once called Mercury.

== Aaron Thomas' journal ==
Aaron Thomas kept a journal from 15 June 1798 to 26 October 1799 in which he gave an account of his time aboard Lapwing. This manuscript is now held by the University of Miami. During this period Lapwing sailed around the Caribbean visiting St. Kitts, Nevis, Antigua, Anguilla, Martinique and Guadeloupe. In August 1799, Lapwing was also involved in the successful operation in which the British seized Paramaribo from the Dutch.
