= French brig Vaillante (1793) =

French naval ship

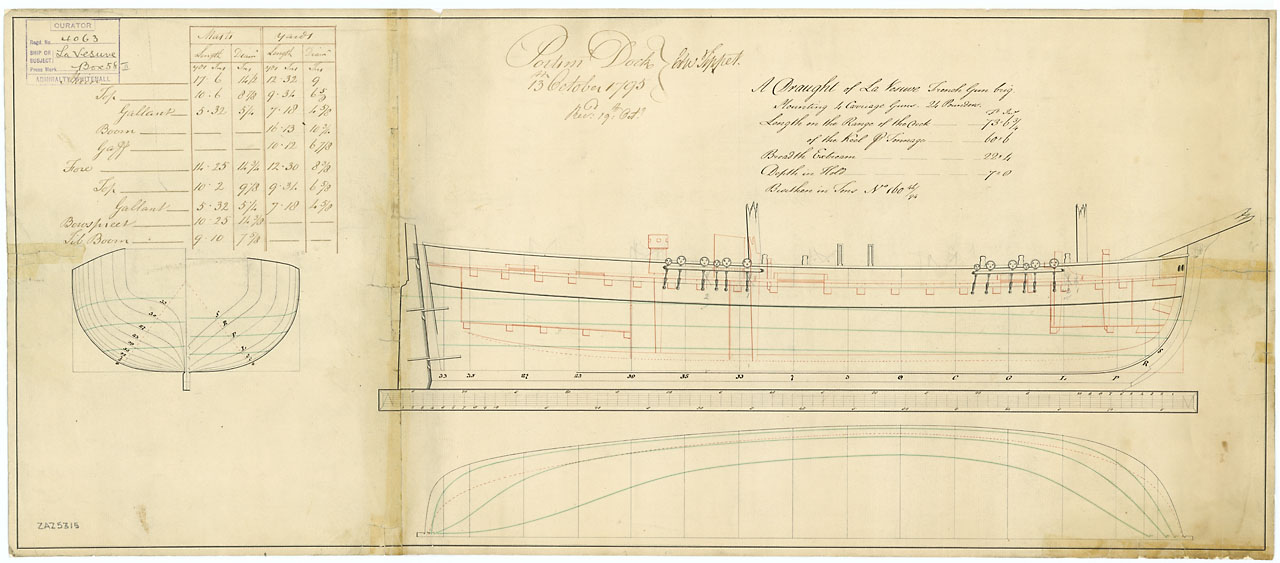
- Plans of Vésuve, lead ship of the class

History

France
- Name: Vaillante
- Laid down: 1793
- Launched: 1793, Saint-Malo
- Fate: Destroyed 26 November 1796

General characteristics
- Class & type: Vésuve-class gunbrig
- Tons burthen: 158 (bm)
- Length: Overall:22.74 m (74.6 ft); Keel:19.49 m (63.9 ft)
- Beam: 6.50 m (21.3 ft)
- Depth of hold: 2.49 m (8 ft 2 in)
- Complement: 53
- Armament: 4 × 24-pounder guns +2 swivel guns

Vaillante was a brick cannonier (gunbrig) launched in 1793, probably at Saint-Malo. She spent the first year or so her career escorting convoys off the coast of Brittany. In May 1795 she was renamed Violente, but she reverted to the name Vaillante in 1796. The British Royal Navy destroyed her in the Caribbean late in 1796.

== Career ==
- Between 27 August 1793 and 9 November, she was under the command of enseigne de vaisseau non entretenu Le Bozec. She was stationed at Perros-Guirec and escorted convoys between Saint-Malo and Brest.
- Between 24 January 1794 and 20 March she was under the command of lieutenant de vaisseau Le Bozec. she escorted convoys between Granville, Manche and Douarnenez.
- Between 19 June 1794 and 2 September she was under the command of enseigne de vaisseau non entretenu Poirier, still escorting convoys between Granville and Douarnenez.

== Fate ==
On 25 November 1796, Captain R. Barton and HMS Lapwing were at St Kitts when an express boat brought the news that a French force consisting of two warships, several smaller ships, and 400 troops, were threatening Anguilla. Contrary winds prevented Lapwing from arriving in time to prevent the French from burning the town. Still, Lapwing was able to meet the French force near St Martin's. There she was able to capture the French corvette Décius, and destroy Vaillante. In all, Lapwing captured 170 men. Décius was armed with twenty-four 6-pounder guns, two 12-pounder carronades, and two field pieces. She had a crew of 133 men, and was carrying 203 troops, all under the command of Citizen Andrée Senis. Vaillante was armed with four 24-pounder guns, had a crew of 45 men, and was carrying 90 troops, all under the command of Citizen Laboutique. Half an hour after Décius struck, Vaillante ran aground at St Martin's, where fire from Lapwing destroyed her.
